= List of dams in Nagano Prefecture =

The following is a list of dams in Nagano Prefecture, Japan.

== List ==
Name	Location	Opened	Height (meters)	Image
Achibake Dam				
Akiyama Dam				
Amekawa Dam				
Asakawa Dam		2016	53	
Azusako Dam				
Dorogawa Dam				
Haino Dam				
Hiraoka Dam		1951	62.5	
Higashijo Dam				
Himekawa No.2 Dam		1935		
Himekawa No.3 Dam				
Horikirizawa Dam				
Ikusaka Dam		1964	19.5	
Ikuta Dam				
Inagawa Dam		1977	43	
Inekoki Dam		1968	60	
Iwakura Dam		1936	25	
Kanabara Dam			36.5	
Katagiri Dam			59.2	
Kiso Dam			35.2	
Kitayama Dam		1999	43	
Kosaka Dam			38.5	
Koshibu Dam			105	
Koya Dam			48.5	
Kurokawa Dam				
Kurosawa Dam				
Lake Kutsuzawako Dam			27.4	
Makio Dam				
Matsukawa Dam		1974		
Midono Dam			95.5	
Lake Midoriko Dam			22	
Minakata Dam				
Miure Dam		1945	83.2	
Minamiaiki Dam		2005	136	
Minochi Dam		1943	25.3	
Minowa Dam		1992	72	
Misogawa Dam		1996	140	
Lake Misuzuko Dam		1951	19	
Miwa Dam				
Mizukami Dam			38	
Murosawa Dam				
Nagawado Dam		1969	155	
Nanakura Dam			125	
Nagai Dam				
Narai Dam			60	
Nishiotaki Dam				
Nishiura Dam				
Otagiri Dam		1954	21.3	
Okubo Dam				
Okususobana Dam				
Ōmachi Dam		1985		
Onikuma Dam			36.5	
Otakigawa Dam			18.2	
Saigawa Dam		1923		
Sasadaira Dam			19.3	
Sawando Dam				
Sayamaike Dam				
Sebadani Dam			22.7	
Shionoiri Dam			18.5	
Sugadaira Dam			41.8	
Susado Dam				
Susobana Dam		1969		
Taira Dam			19.5	
Takase Dam			176	
Takato Dam			30.9	
Tatsugasawa Dam				
Tokiwa Dam			24.1	
Toyooka Dam		1994	81	
Uchimura Dam			51.3	
Wachino Dam				
Yamaguchi Dam		29 Dec 1957	38.6	
Yasuoka Dam			50	
Yatategi Sabo Dam				
Yoji Dam			42	
Yokokawa Dam			41	
Yomikaki Dam			32.1	
Yukawa Dam			50	
Yunose Dam			18	

== See also ==
- Media related to Dams in Nagano prefecture at Wikimedia Commons
