= Uchimura =

Uchimura may refer to

- Uchimura (surname)
- Uchimura Dam in the Nagano Prefecture, Japan
- Uchimura Produce, a Japanese TV comedy program
