= Odagiri =

Odagiri (written: 小田切 or 小田桐) is a Japanese surname. Notable people with the surname include:

- Joe Odagiri (小田切 譲, born 1976), Japanese actor and musician
- Yukio Odagiri (小田桐 幸雄, born 1956), Japanese boxer
- Yūko Odagiri (小田切 悠子, born 1987), better known as Yuu Kashii, Japanese actress and model

== Fictional characters ==
- Aya Odagiri (小田切 綾), a character in the tokusatsu anime series Chōjin Sentai Jetman
- Futaba Odagiri (小田切 双葉), a main character in the manga and anime series Three Leaves, Three Colors
- Hidetoshi Odagiri (小田桐 秀利), a supporting character in the game Persona 3

== See also ==
- Otagiri Dam, a dam in Nagano Prefecture, Japan
