= Matsukawa =

Matsukawa may refer to:

== Places ==
- Matsukawa, Nagano (Kitaazumi), a village in Kitaazumi District, Nagano Prefecture, Japan
- Matsukawa, Nagano (Shimoina), a town in Shimoina District, Nagano Prefecture
- Matsukawa Dam, Nagano Prefecture

=== Railway stations ===
- Matsukawa Station, Tōhoku Main Line, Fukushima, Fukushima Prefecture
- Rikuchū-Matsukawa Station, Ōfunato Line, Ichinoseki, Iwate Prefecture
- Shinano-Matsukawa Station, Ōito Line, Kitaazumi District, Nagano Prefecture

== People with the surname ==
- Nami Matsukawa (born 1961), Japanese actress
- Naruki Matsukawa (born 1991), Japanese actor
- Tomoaki Matsukawa (born 1973), Japanese football player

== Other uses ==
- Matsukawa derailment, a 1949 train derailment near Matsukawa Station, Fukushima
- Matsukawa (restaurant), Tokyo
