= Tokiwa Dam =

Tokiwa Dam may refer to:

- Tokiwa Dam (Hokkaido)
- Tokiwa Dam (Nagano)
- Tokiwa Dam (Hyōgo)
