= Mizukami =

Mizukami may refer to:

- Mizukami, Kumamoto, a village in Kuma District, Kumamoto Prefecture, Japan
- Mizukami Dam, a dam in Nagano Prefecture, Japan

== Notable people with the surname ==
- Noriyasu Mizukami (水上 則安; born 1947), Japanese long-distance runner
- Satoshi Mizukami (水上 悟志; born 1980), Japanese manga artist
- Koshi Mizukami (水上 恒司; born 1999), Japanese actor
