= Yokokawa =

Yokokawa may refer to:

== People ==
- Asahi Yokokawa (born 2002), Japanese footballer
- Izumi Yokokawa (born 1963), Japanese footballer

== Other uses ==
- Yokokawa Dam, dam in Japan
- Yokokawa Station, railway station in Japan
