= Minowa Dam =

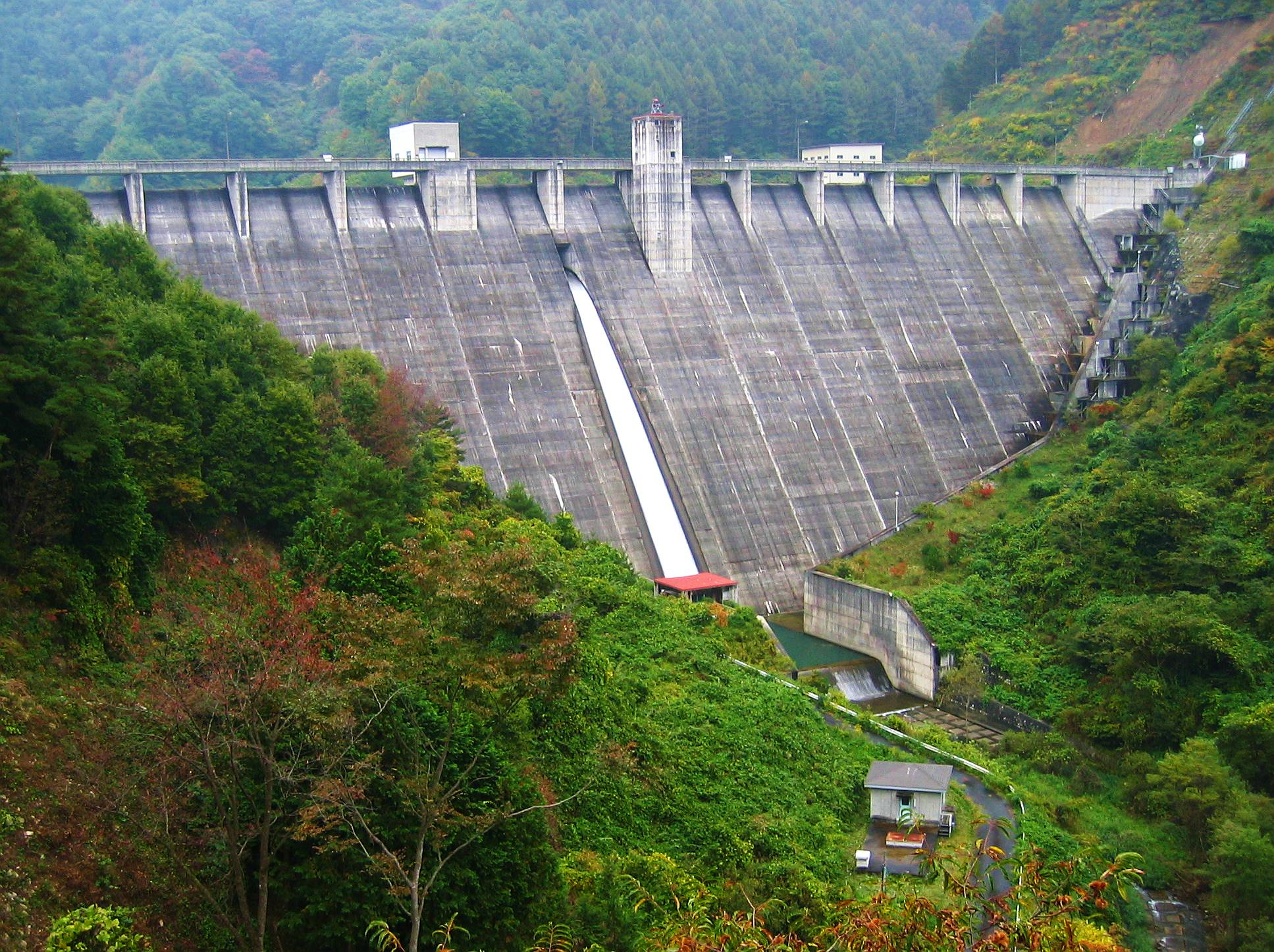
- Interactive map of Minowa Dam
- Location: Nagano Prefecture, Japan
- Coordinates: 35°55′41″N 138°01′50″E

Minowa Dam (Japanese: 箕輪ダム) is a dam in the Nagano Prefecture, Japan, completed in 1992.
