= Horikirizawa Dam =

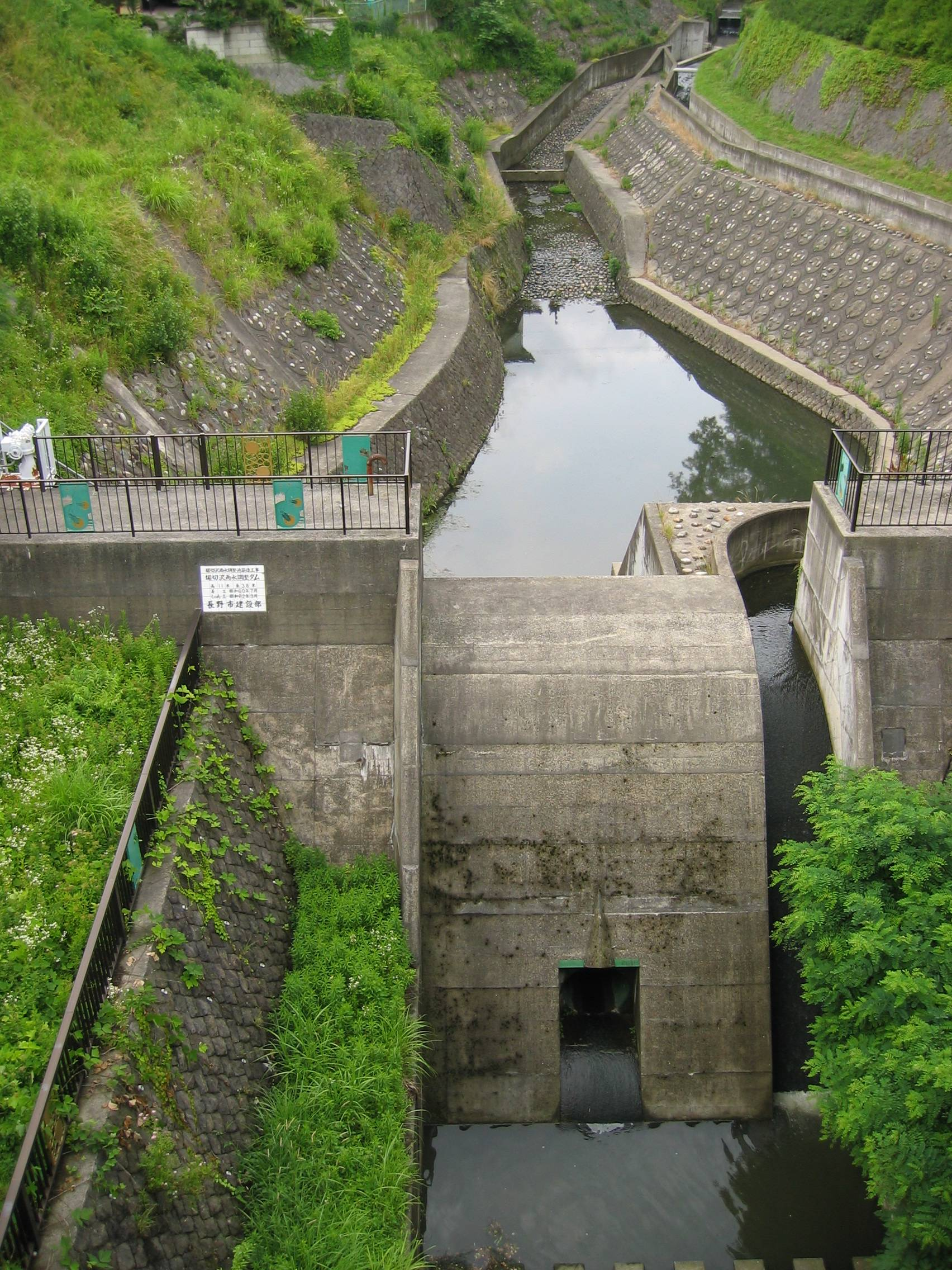

- Location within Nagano Prefecture Location within Japan
- Location: Nagano Prefecture, Japan
- Coordinates: 36°39′53″N 138°11′35″E

Horikirizawa Dam (Japanese: 堀切沢雨水調整ダム) is a dam in Nagano Prefecture, Japan.

== See also ==
- List of dams and reservoirs in Japan
