= Kanabara Dam =

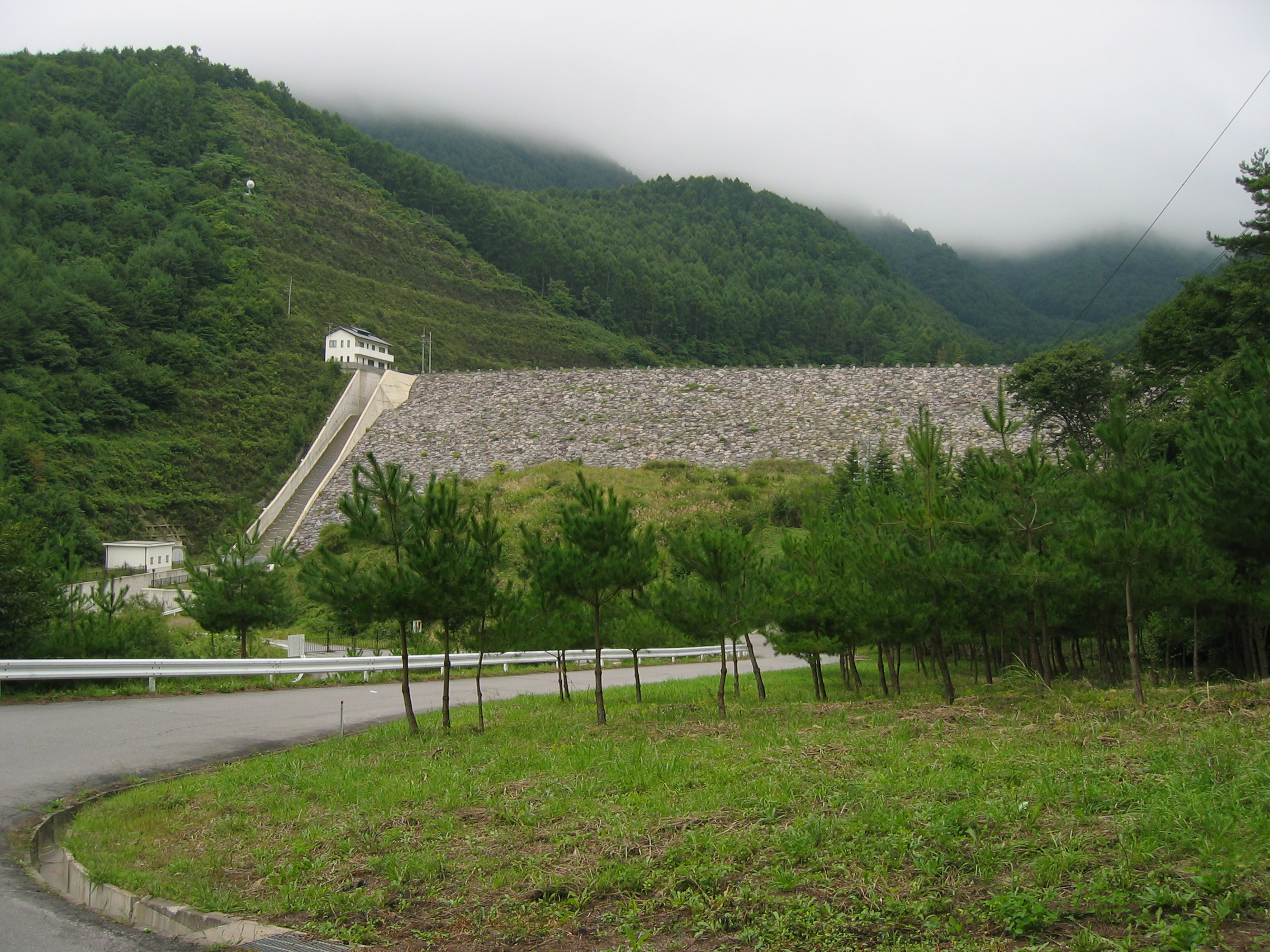
- Location: Nagano Prefecture, Japan
- Coordinates: 36°24′30″N 138°21′44″E

Kanabara Dam (Japanese: 金原ダム) is a dam in the Nagano Prefecture, Japan, completed in 1999.
