= Achibake Dam =

Coordinates: 35°57′37″N 138°38′35″E

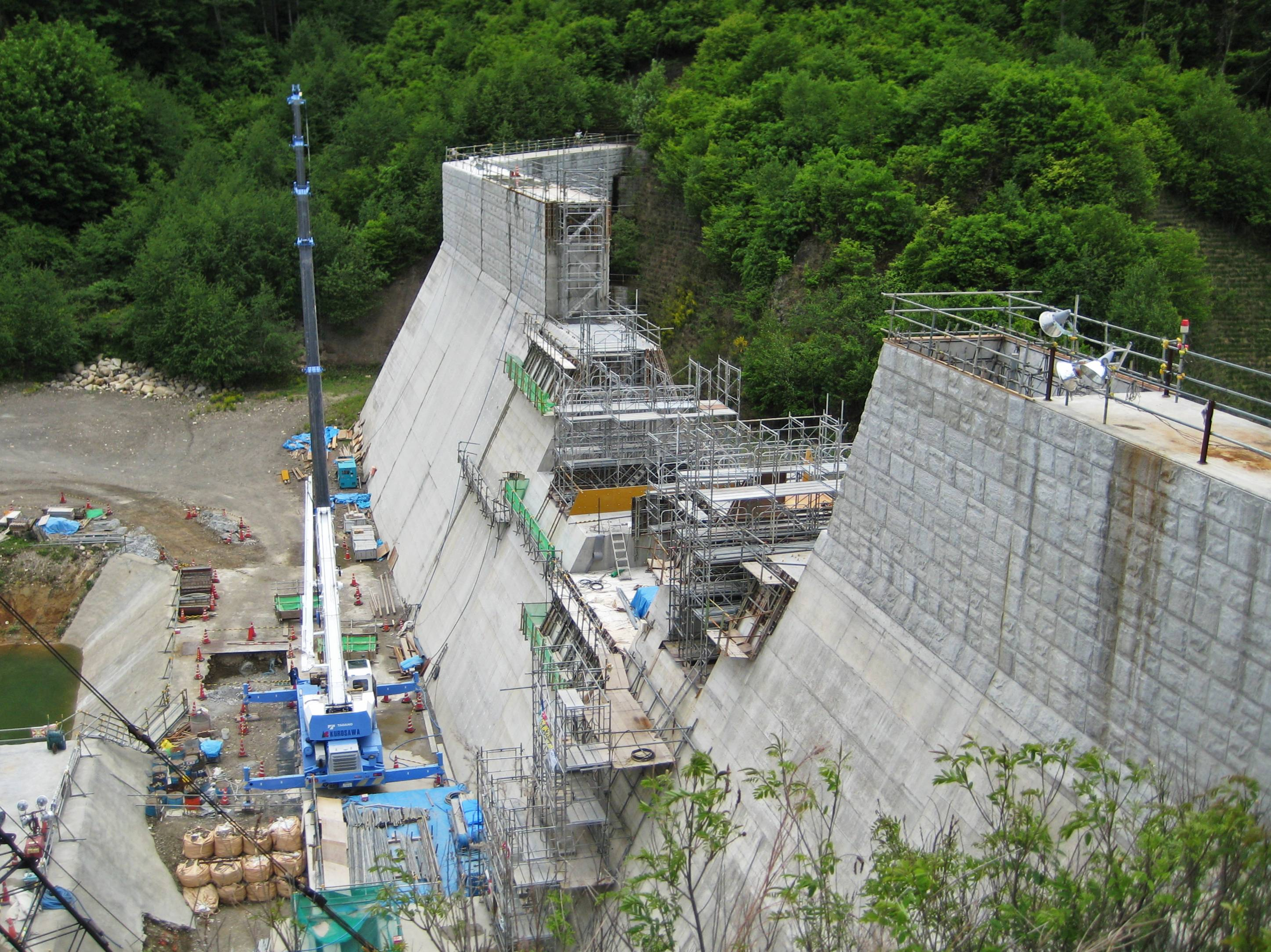
- Interactive map of Achibake Dam
- Official name: あちばけダム
- Location: Kawakami, Nagano, Japan

Dam and spillways
- Type of dam: Gravity dam

Achibake Dam (Japanese: あちばけダム) is a gravity dam in Kawakami, Nagano Prefecture, Japan.

== See also ==
- List of dams and reservoirs in Japan
