= Lake Misuzu Dam =

Lake Misuzuko Dam
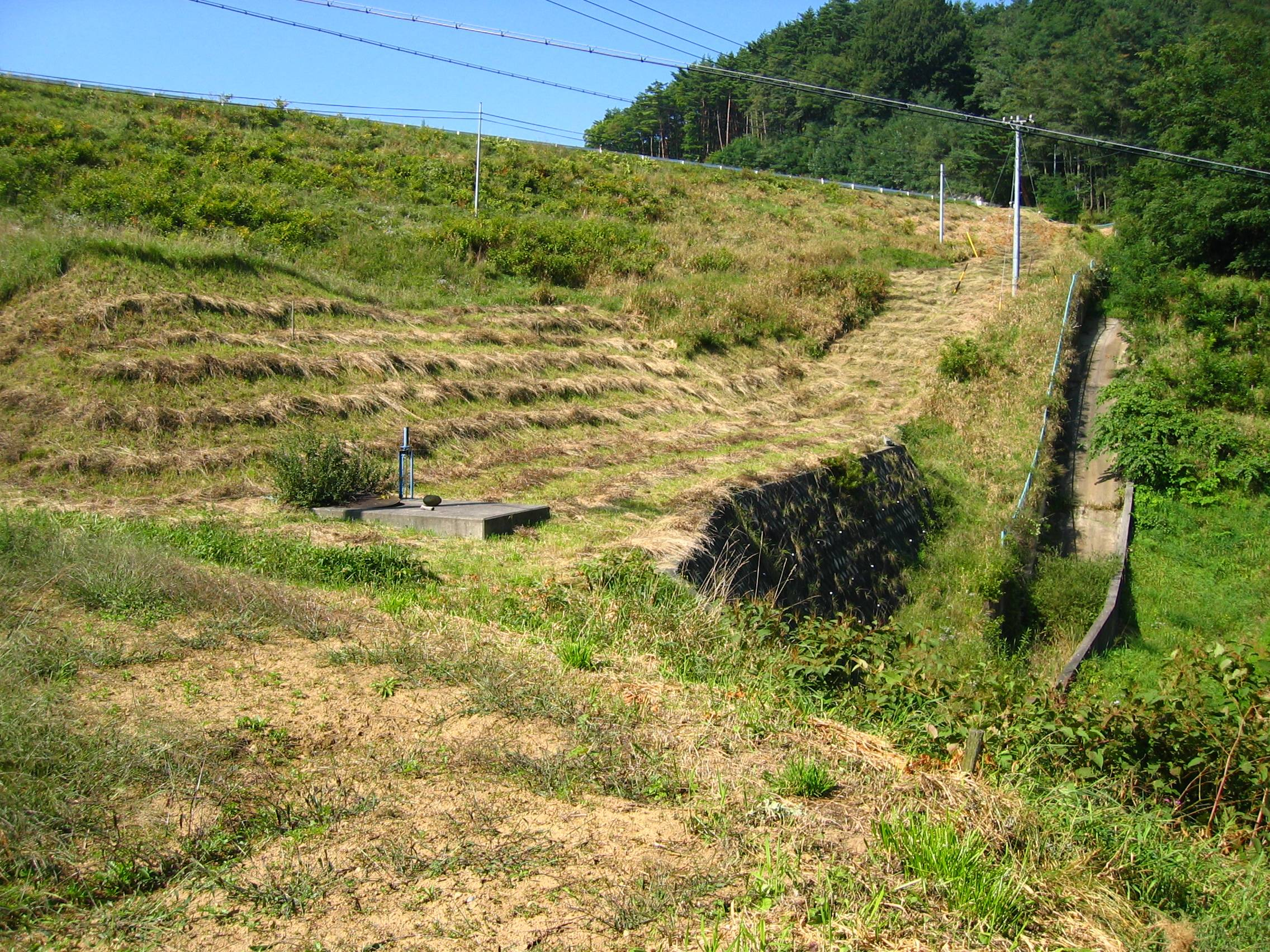

- Location within Japan
- Location: Matsumoto, Nagano, Japan
- Coordinates: 36°15′49″N 138°1′1″E
- Opening date: 1951

Reservoir
- Creates: Lake Misuzu

Lake Misuzu Dam (美鈴湖ダム, Misuzu-ko damu) is a dam in Matsumoto, Nagano Prefecture, Japan, completed in 1951.
