= Minochi Dam =

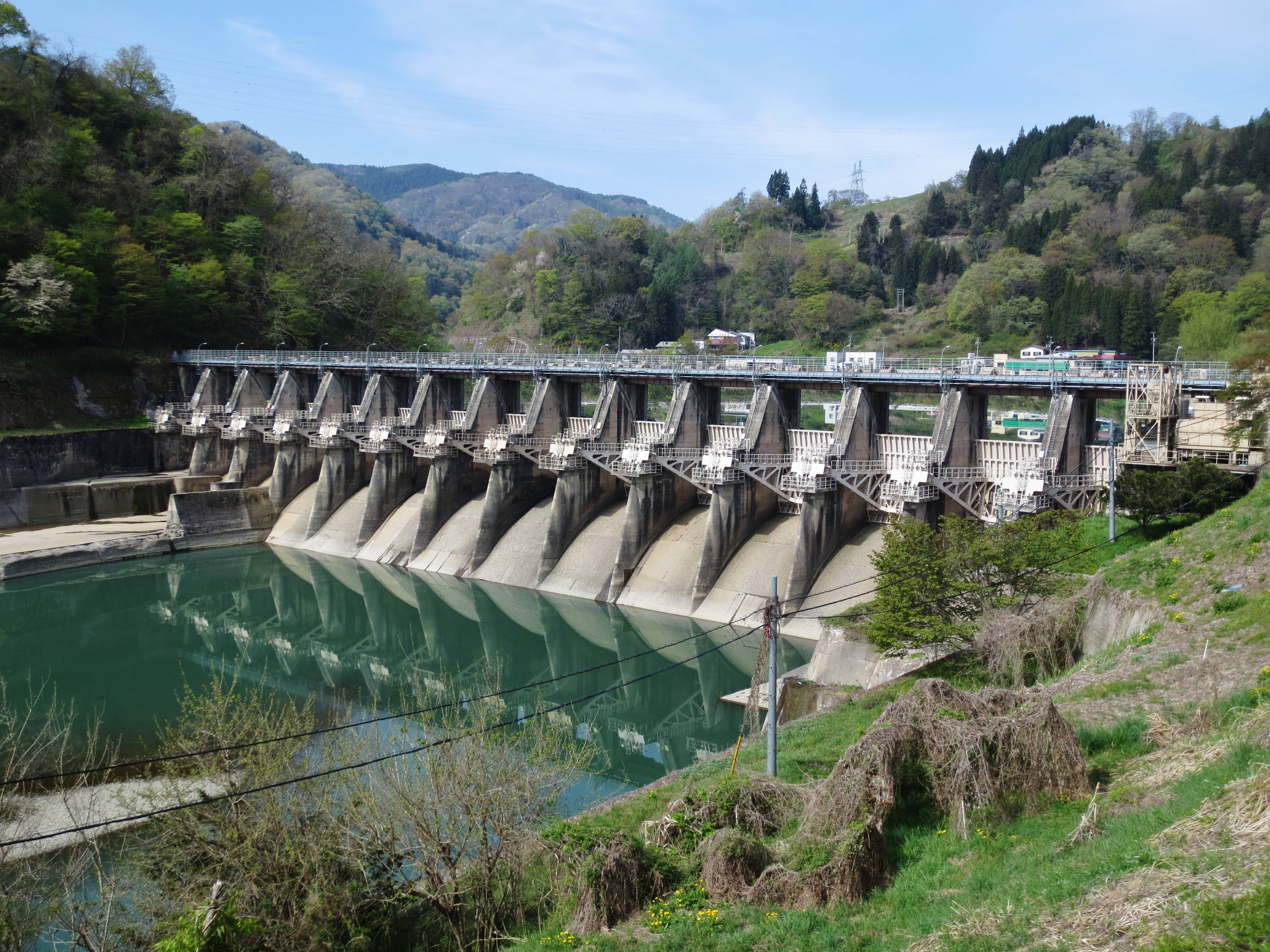
- Interactive map of Minochi Dam
- Location: Nagano Prefecture, Japan
- Coordinates: 36°34′23″N 138°02′44″E

Minochi Dam (Japanese: 水内ダム) is a dam in the Nagano Prefecture, Japan, completed in 1943.
