= Toyooka Dam =

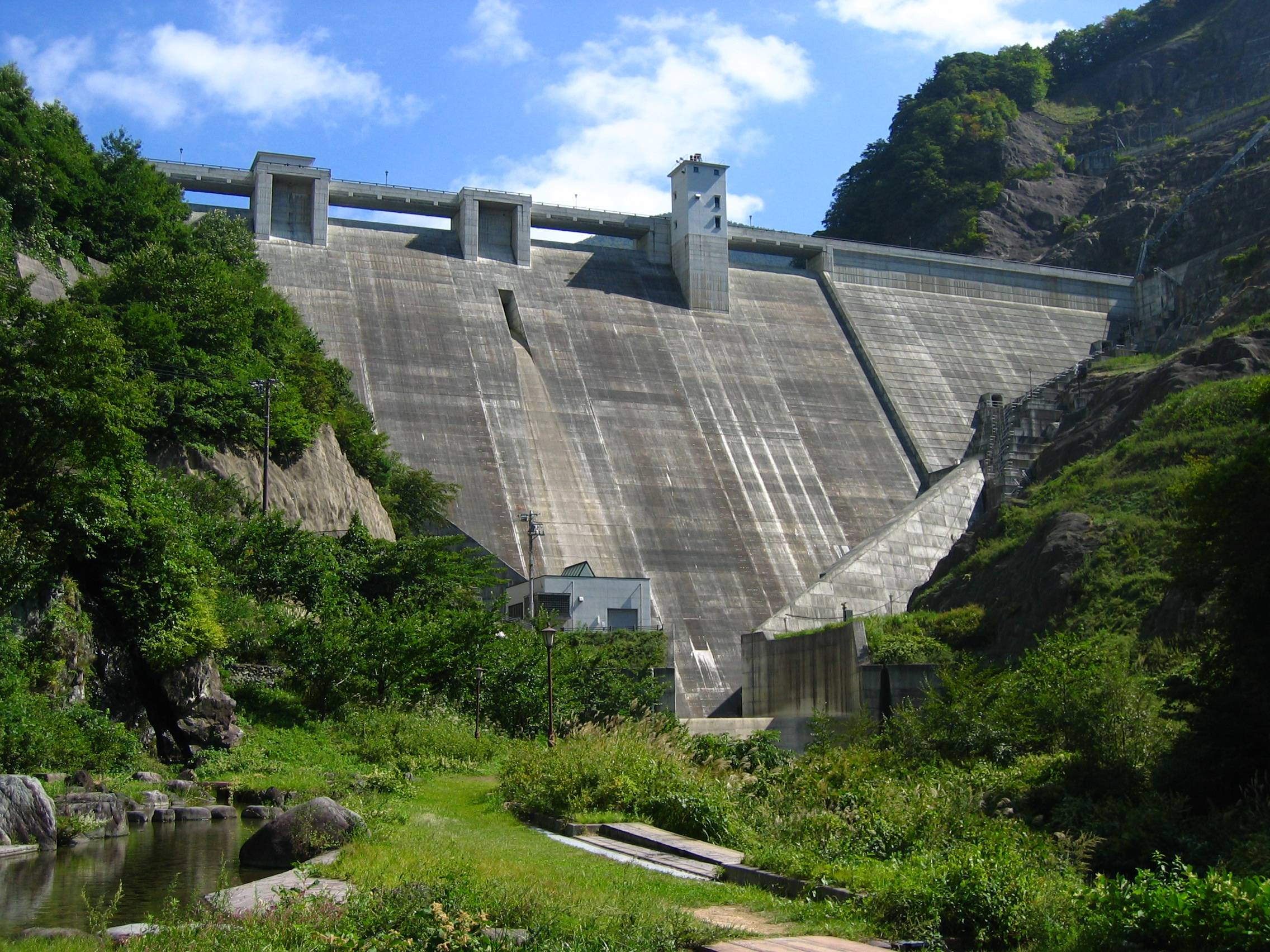
- Interactive map of Toyooka Dam
- Location: Suzaka, Nagano, Japan
- Coordinates: 36°37′15″N 138°22′39″E
- Construction began: 1978
- Opening date: 1994

Dam and spillways
- Type of dam: Gravity dam
- Impounds: Dodo River
- Height: 81 m (266 ft)
- Length: 238 m (781 ft)
- Dam volume: 294,000 m^{3}

Reservoir
- Total capacity: 2,580,000 m^{3}
- Catchment area: 13.1 km^{2}
- Surface area: 10 ha

Toyooka Dam (豊丘ダム, Toyooka damu) is a dam in Suzaka, Nagano Prefecture, Japan, completed in 1978 and 1994. Formerly known as Haino Dam (灰野ダム), it is located on the Shinano River and Haino River.
