= Sebadani Dam =

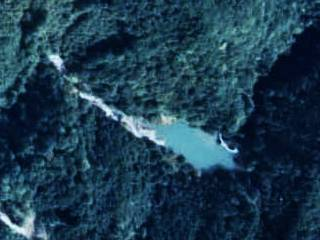
- Interactive map of Sebadani Dam
- Location: Nagano Prefecture, Japan
- Coordinates: 36°10′13″N 137°38′01″E

Sebadani Dam (Japanese: セバ谷ダム) is a dam in the Nagano Prefecture, Japan, completed in 1928.
