= Okususobana Dam =

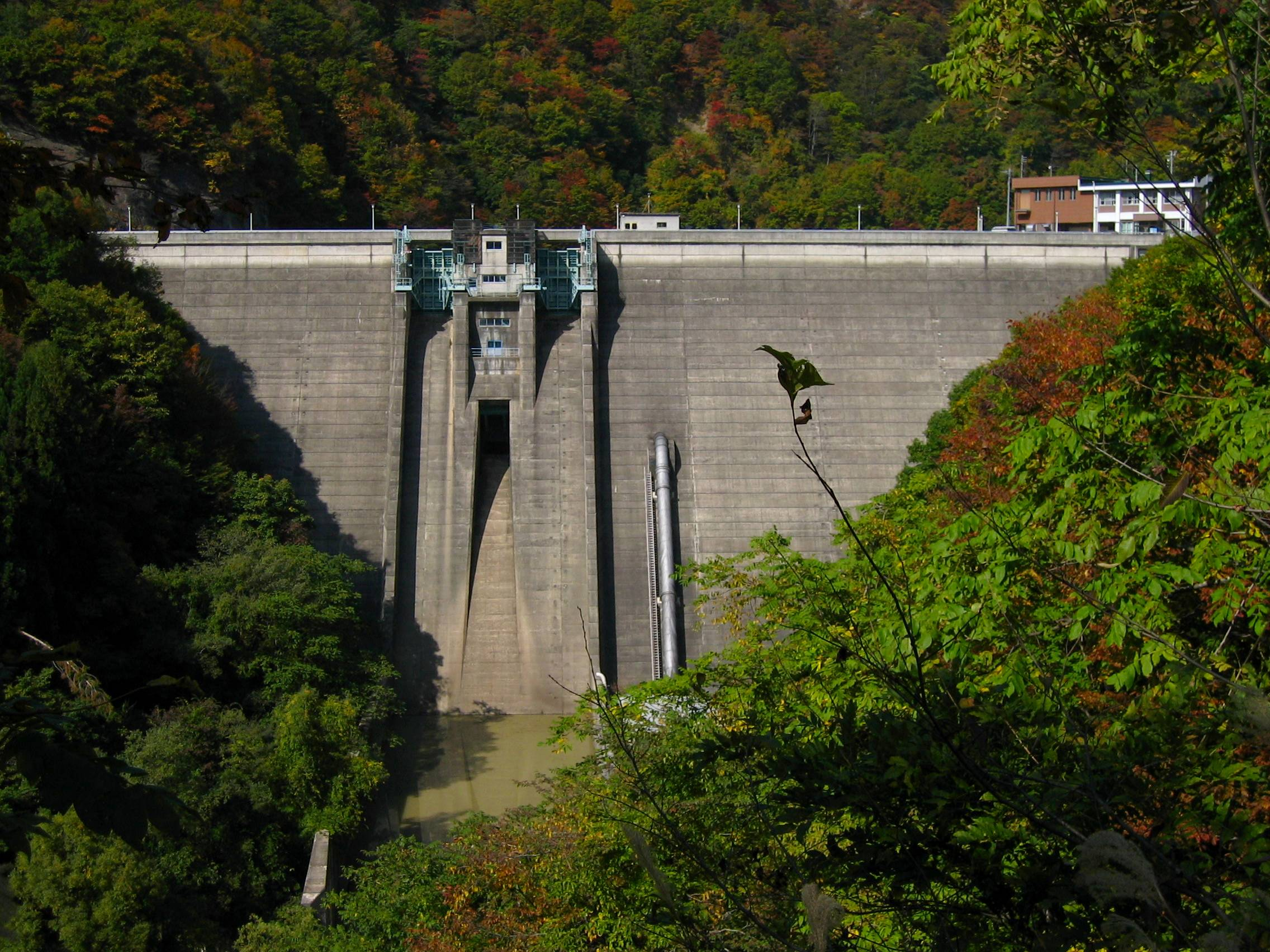
- Interactive map of Okususobana Dam
- Location: Nagano Prefecture, Japan
- Coordinates: 36°43′30″N 137°58′00″E

Okususobana Dam (Japanese: 奥裾花ダム) is a dam in the Nagano Prefecture, Japan, completed in 1979.
