= Amekawa Dam =

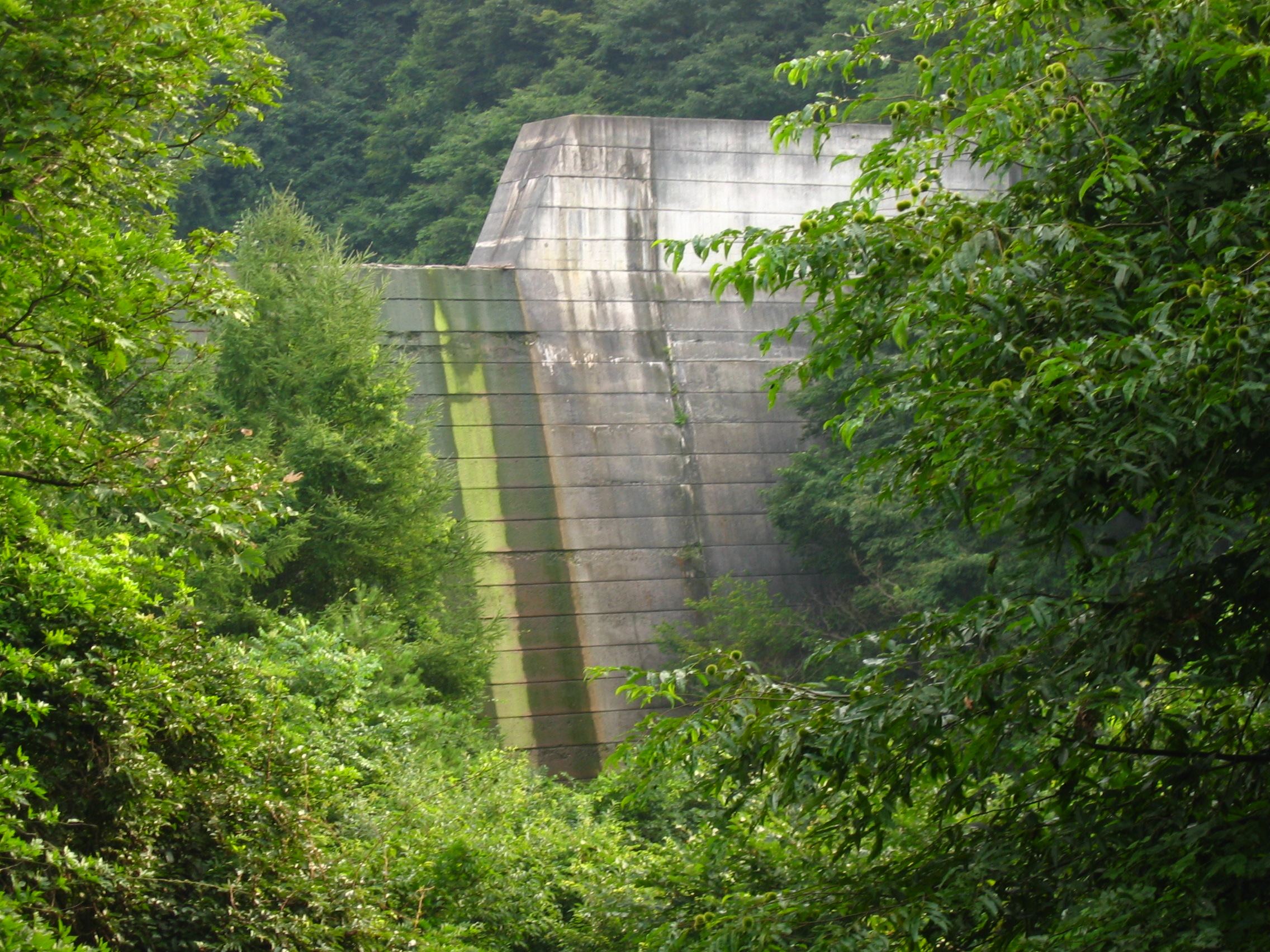
- Amekawa Dam
- Interactive map of Amekawa Dam
- Country: Japan
- Location: Saku, Nagano
- Coordinates: 36°11′5″N 138°33′8″E
- Purpose: Multi-purpose
- Status: Operational
- Construction began: 1971
- Opening date: November 30, 1974

Dam and spillways
- Type of dam: Gravity dam
- Impounds: Amekawa
- Height (thalweg): 28 m
- Length: 126 m (413 ft)
- Dam volume: 38,000 m^{3}

Reservoir
- Total capacity: 800,000 m^{3}
- Surface area: 8.9 ha
- Maximum water depth: 28 m

Amekawa Dam (Japanese: 雨川ダム) is a check dam on Ame river in Saku, Nagano Prefecture, Japan. The primary purpose is reducing water flow velocity to counteract erosion. It is also used for water supply.

The pole of inaccessibility of Japan lies near this dam.

== See also ==
- List of dams and reservoirs in Japan
