= Uchimura (surname) =

Uchimura is a Japanese surname. Notable people with the surname include:

- Uchimura Kanzō (1861–1930), Japanese author and Christian evangelist
- Kensuke Uchimura (born 1986), Japanese baseball player
- Kōhei Uchimura (born 1989), Japanese artistic gymnast
- Chigusa Ikeda (born 1976, also known as Miruku Uchimura), Japanese voice actress
- Teruyoshi Uchimura (born 1964), Japanese comedian
