= Koya Dam =

Coordinates: 36°07′26″N 138°35′37″E

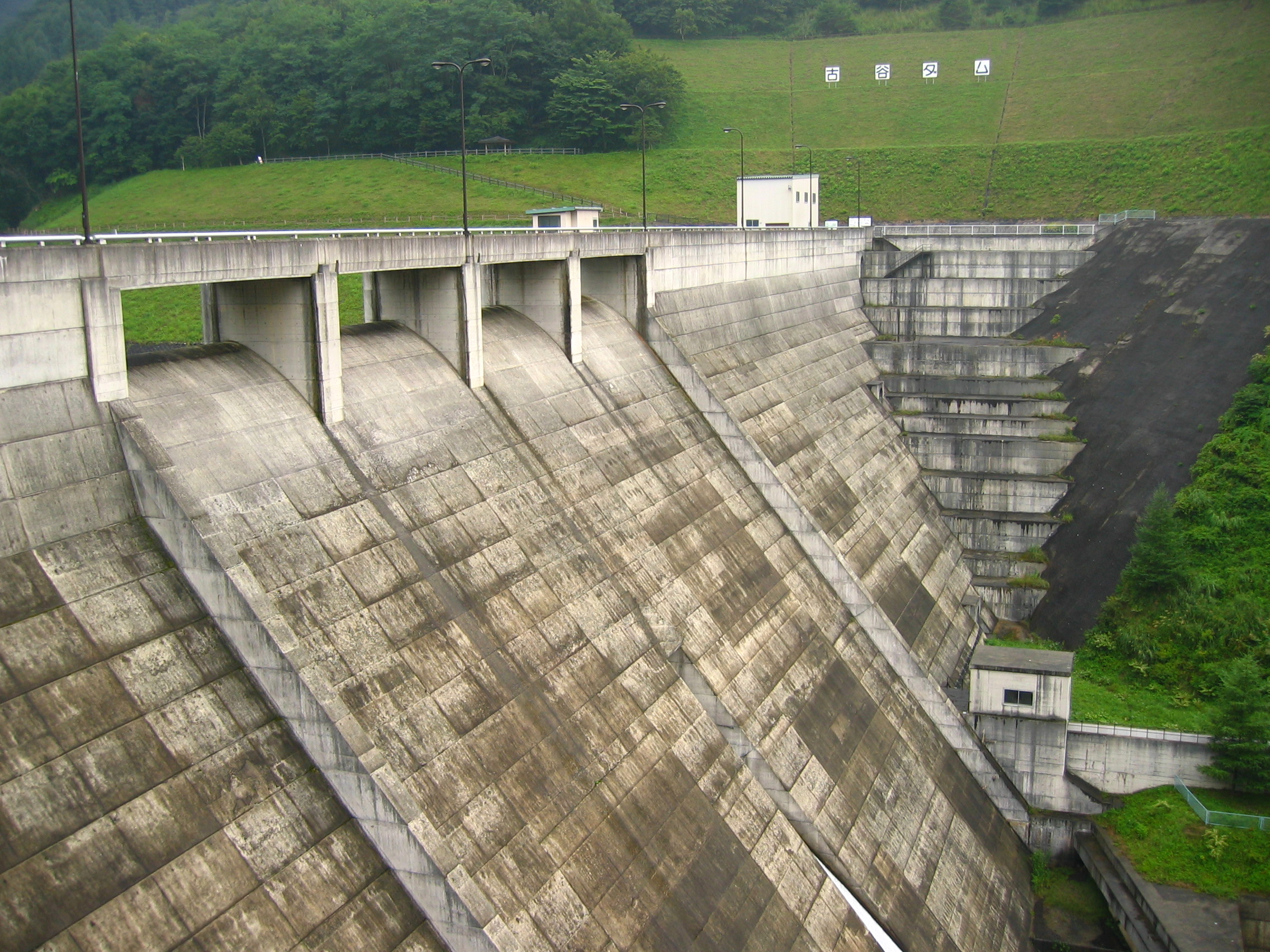
- Interactive map of Koya Dam
- Official name: 古谷ダム
- Location: Nagano Prefecture, Japan
- Purpose: Flood control
- Construction began: 1969
- Opening date: 1982; 44 years ago
- Operator: Nagano Prefecture

Dam and spillways
- Type of dam: Gravity dam
- Impounds: Shinano River
- Elevation at crest: 48.5 m (159.1 ft)

Reservoir
- Catchment area: 13 km² (5 mi²)

Koya Dam (Japanese: 古谷ダム) is a dam in the Nagano Prefecture, Japan, completed in 1982.
