= Nishiura Dam =

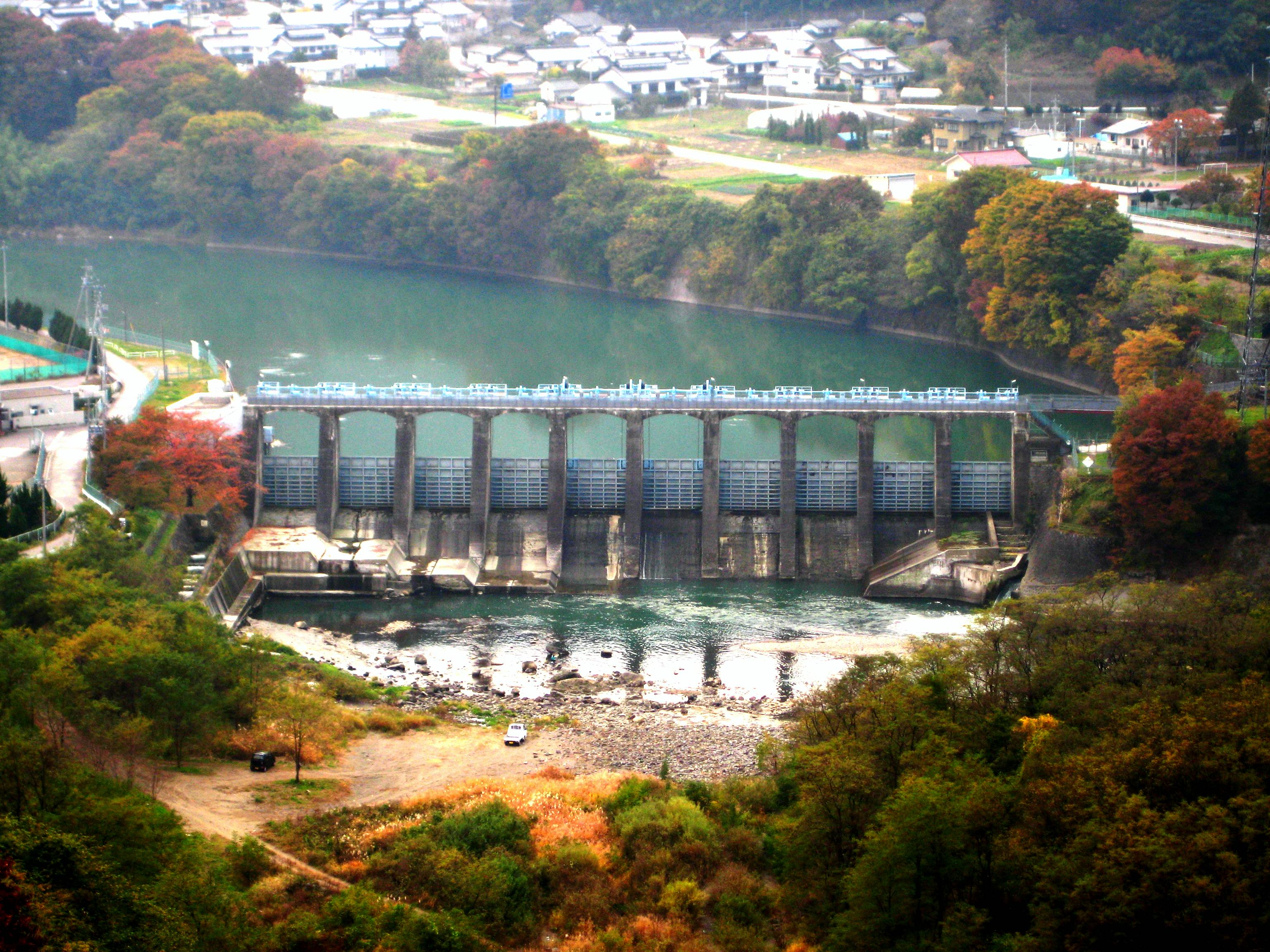
- Interactive map of Nishiura Dam
- Location: Nagano Prefecture, Japan
- Coordinates: 36°19′26″N 138°24′48″E

Nishiura Dam (Japanese: 西浦ダム) is a dam in the Nagano Prefecture, Japan.
