= Koshibu Dam =

Coordinates: 35°36′25″N 137°58′44″E

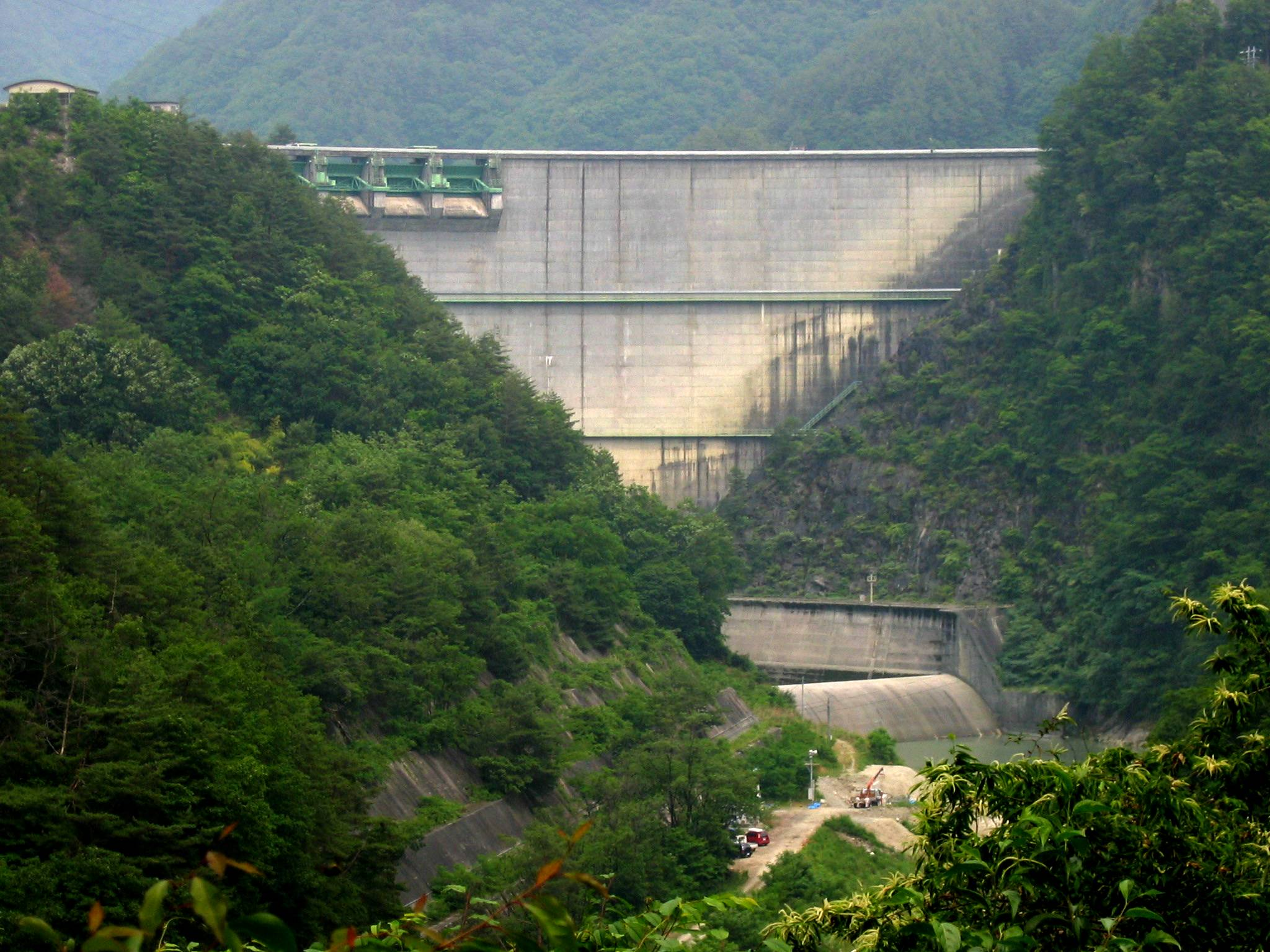
- Interactive map of Koshibu Dam
- Official name: 小渋ダム
- Location: Nagano Prefecture, Japan
- Purpose: Flood control, irrigation, power generation
- Construction began: 1961
- Opening date: 1969; 57 years ago
- Owners: Chūbu Regional Development Bureau, Ministry of Land, Infrastructure, Transport and Tourism

Dam and spillways
- Type of dam: Arch dam
- Impounds: Tenryū River

Reservoir
- Creates: Koshibu Lake
- Catchment area: 288 km² (111.2 mi²)

Koshibu Number 1 Power Plant Koshibu Number 2 Power Plant Koshibu Number 3 Power Plant
- Installed capacity: 9.5MW; 6.5MW; 0.55MW

Koshibu Dam (Japanese: 小渋ダム) is a dam in the Nagano Prefecture, Japan, completed in 1969.
