= Kōsaka Dam =

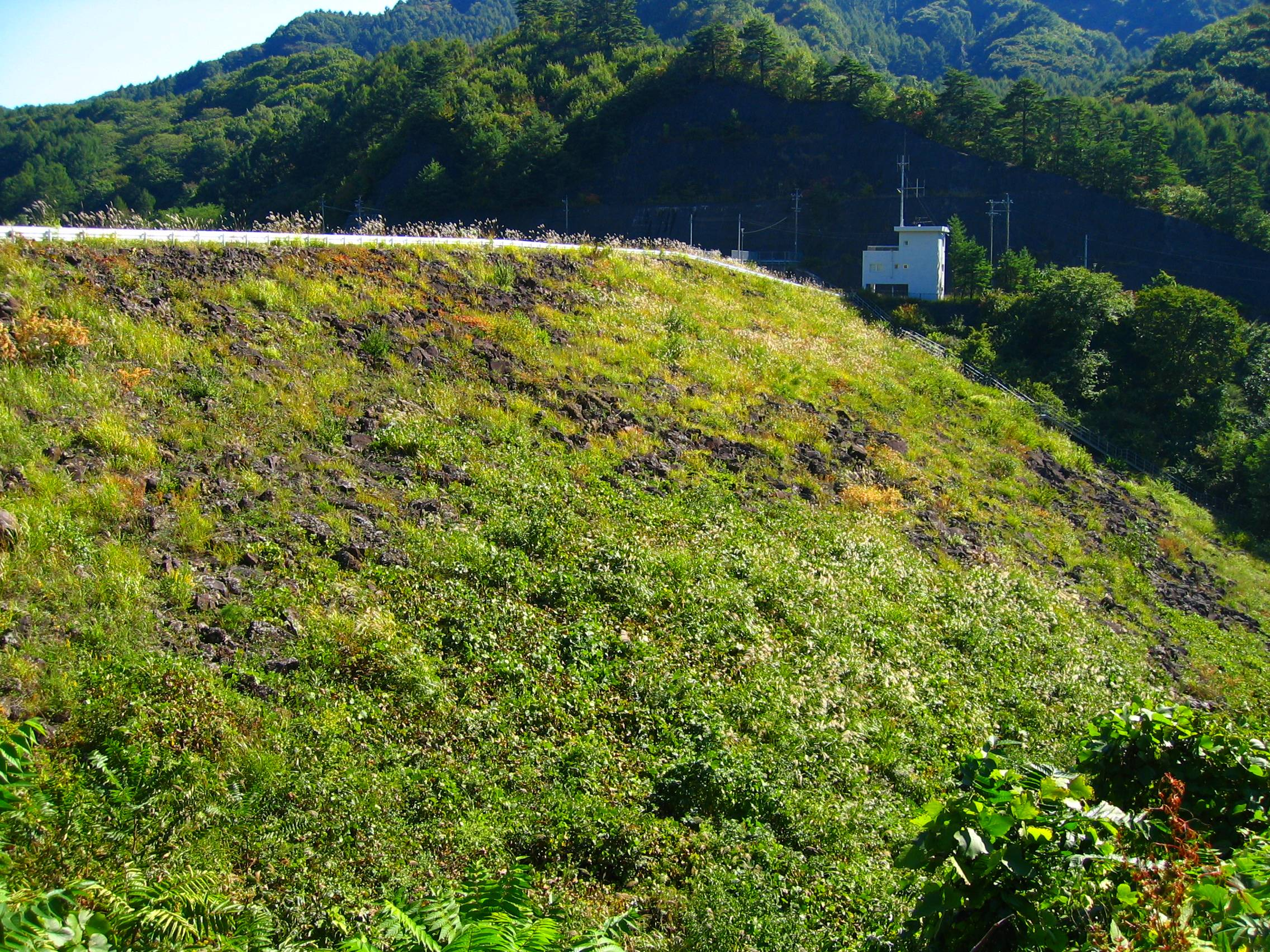
- Interactive map of Kōsaka Dam
- Country: Japan
- Location: Saku, Nagano
- Coordinates: 36°15′54″N 138°32′55″E
- Purpose: Flood control
- Status: Operational
- Construction began: 1969
- Opening date: 1972
- Construction cost: 1,222,000,000 JPY

Dam and spillways
- Type of dam: Embankment dam
- Impounds: Kosaka river
- Height (thalweg): 38.5 m
- Length: 184.0 m (603.7 ft)
- Dam volume: 334,000 m^{3}

Reservoir
- Creates: Lake Kōsaka Dam
- Total capacity: 1,050,000 m^{3}
- Active capacity: 870,000 m^{3}
- Catchment area: 14 km^{2}
- Surface area: 11 ha

Kosaka Dam (Japanese: 香坂ダム) is an embankment dam on the Kosaka river in the Saku, Nagano, Japan, completed in 1972. The primary purpose is flood control, because villages in the Kosaka River basin suffered heavy damage from the floods.

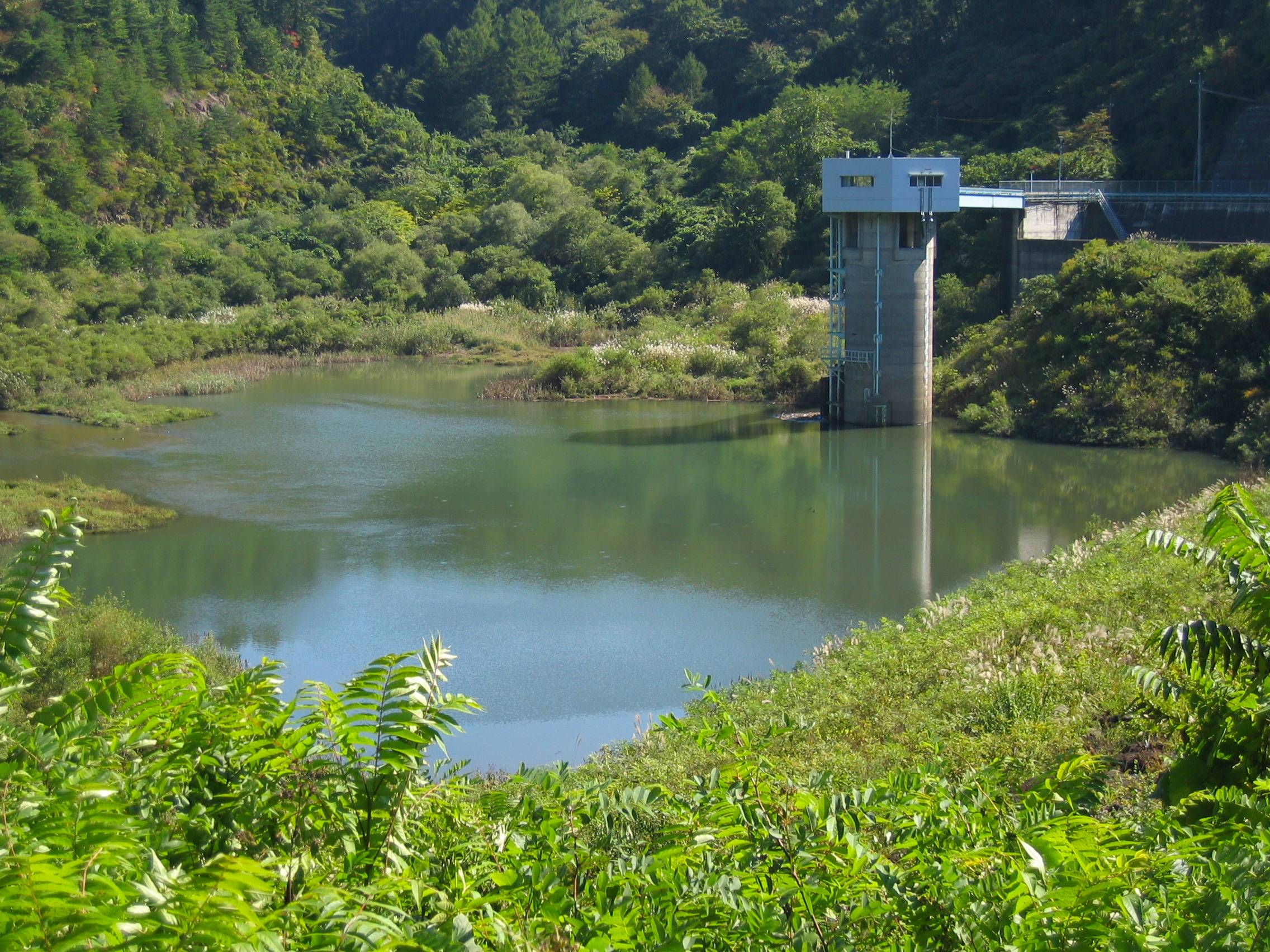
Lake Kōsaka Dam

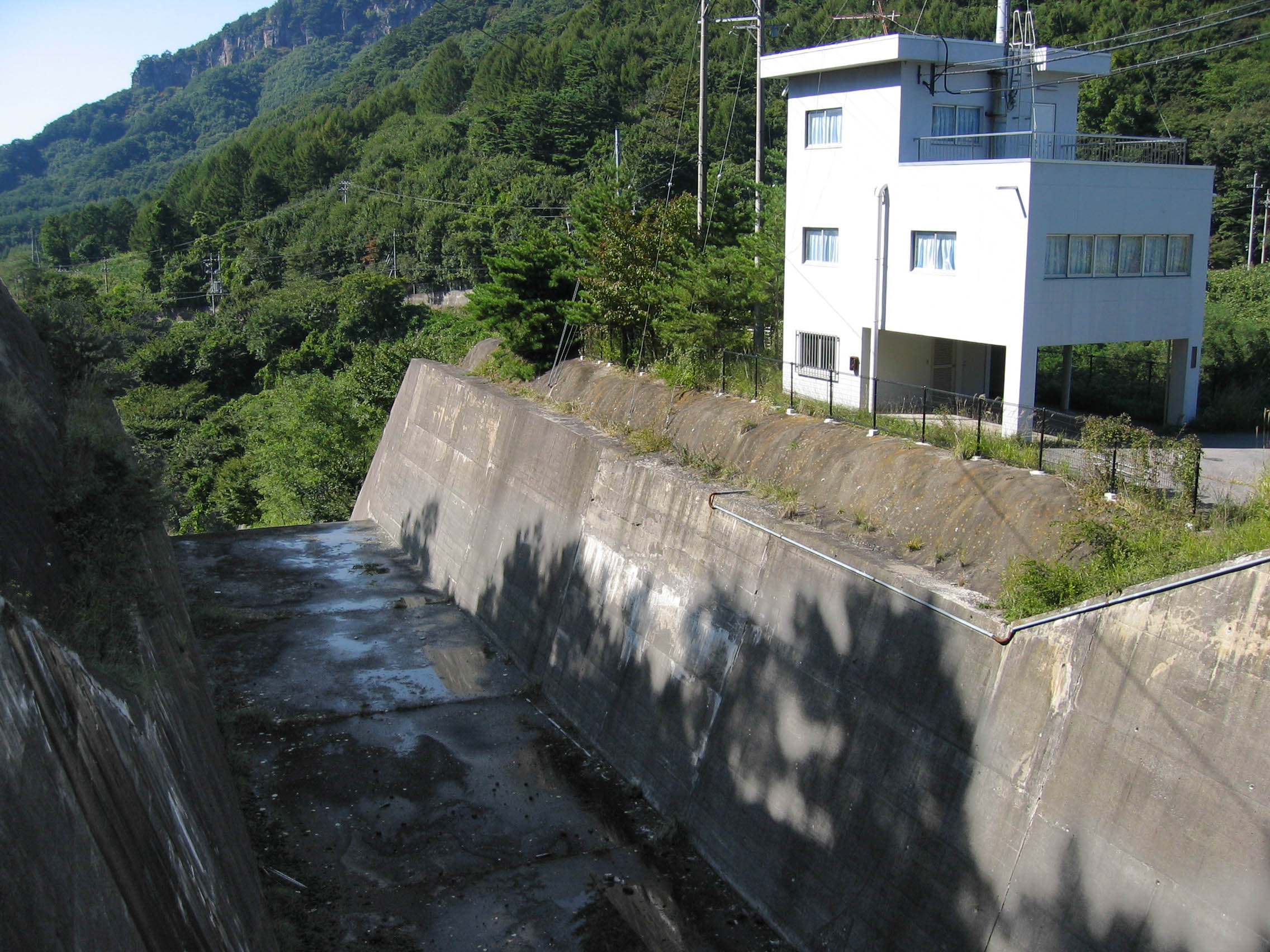
Kōsaka Dam office and spillway
