= Otagiri Dam =

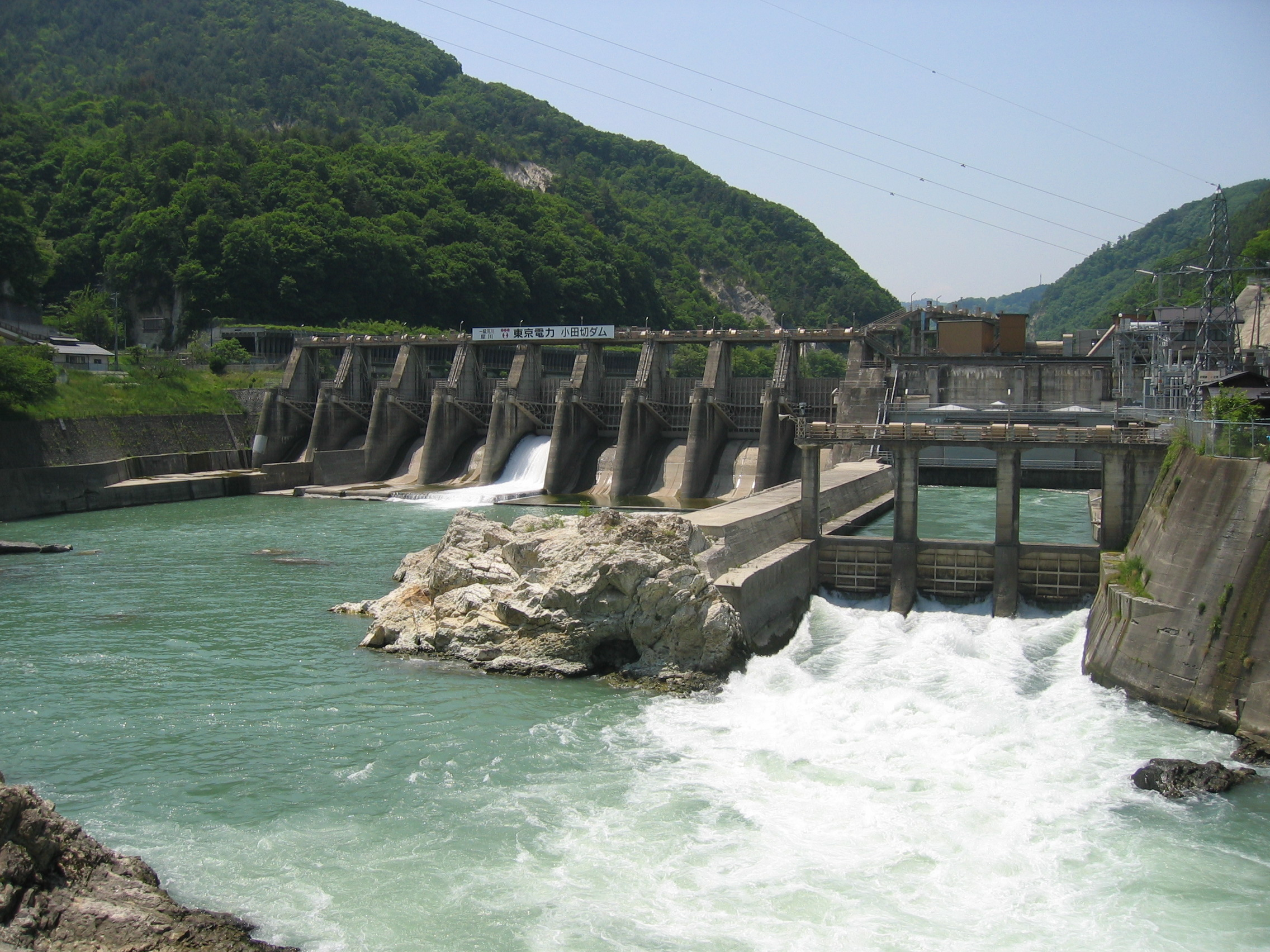

- Location within Japan
- Official name: 小田切ダム（Otagiri Dam）
- Location: Nagano Prefecture, Japan
- Coordinates: 36°37′12″N 138°07′24″E
- Purpose: Power
- Construction began: 1953
- Opening date: 1954

Dam and spillways
- Type of dam: Gravity dam
- Height: 21.3 m (70 ft)
- Dam volume: 17,000 m^{3}

Power Station
- Operator: Tokyo Electric Power Company
- Installed capacity: 16,900 KW

Otagiri Dam (Japanese: 小田切ダム) (also sometimes read as Odagiri Dam) is a dam in the Nagano Prefecture, Japan, completed in 1954.

== Name origin ==
The name of the dam originates from the old village "Otagiri" (小田切) (not "Odagiri"). Etymologically "Otagiri" consists of "O" and "tagiri". "O" is a prefix of Japanese. "Tagiri" is the gerund of the verb "tagiru" (it means the motion of water like "boil"). In Nagano Prefecture there are many such place names like "Tagiri", "Ô-tagiri", "Naka-tagiri", "Inu-tagiri", "Fut-tagiri", and "Ka-tagiri".
