= Yunose Dam =

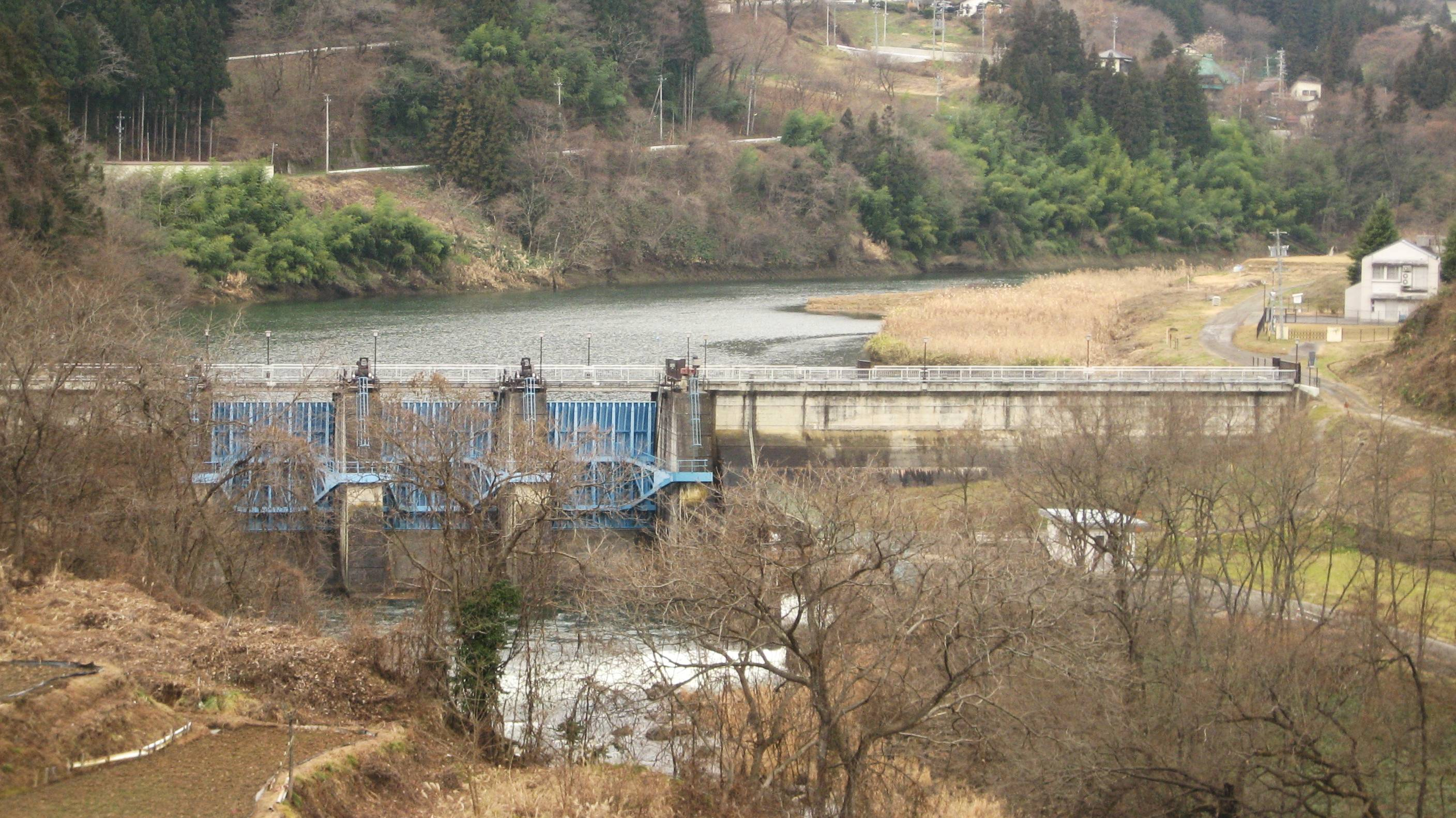
- Interactive map of Yunose Dam
- Location: Nagano Prefecture, Japan
- Coordinates: 36°39′50″N 138°08′00″E
- Construction began: 1965
- Opening date: 1969

Dam and spillways
- Height (foundation): 18m
- Width (crest): 140m
- Dam volume: 15 thousand m³

Reservoir
- Total capacity: 330 thousand m³

Yunose Dam (Japanese: 湯の瀬ダム) is a dam in the Nagano Prefecture, Japan, completed in 1969.
