= Sasadaira Dam =

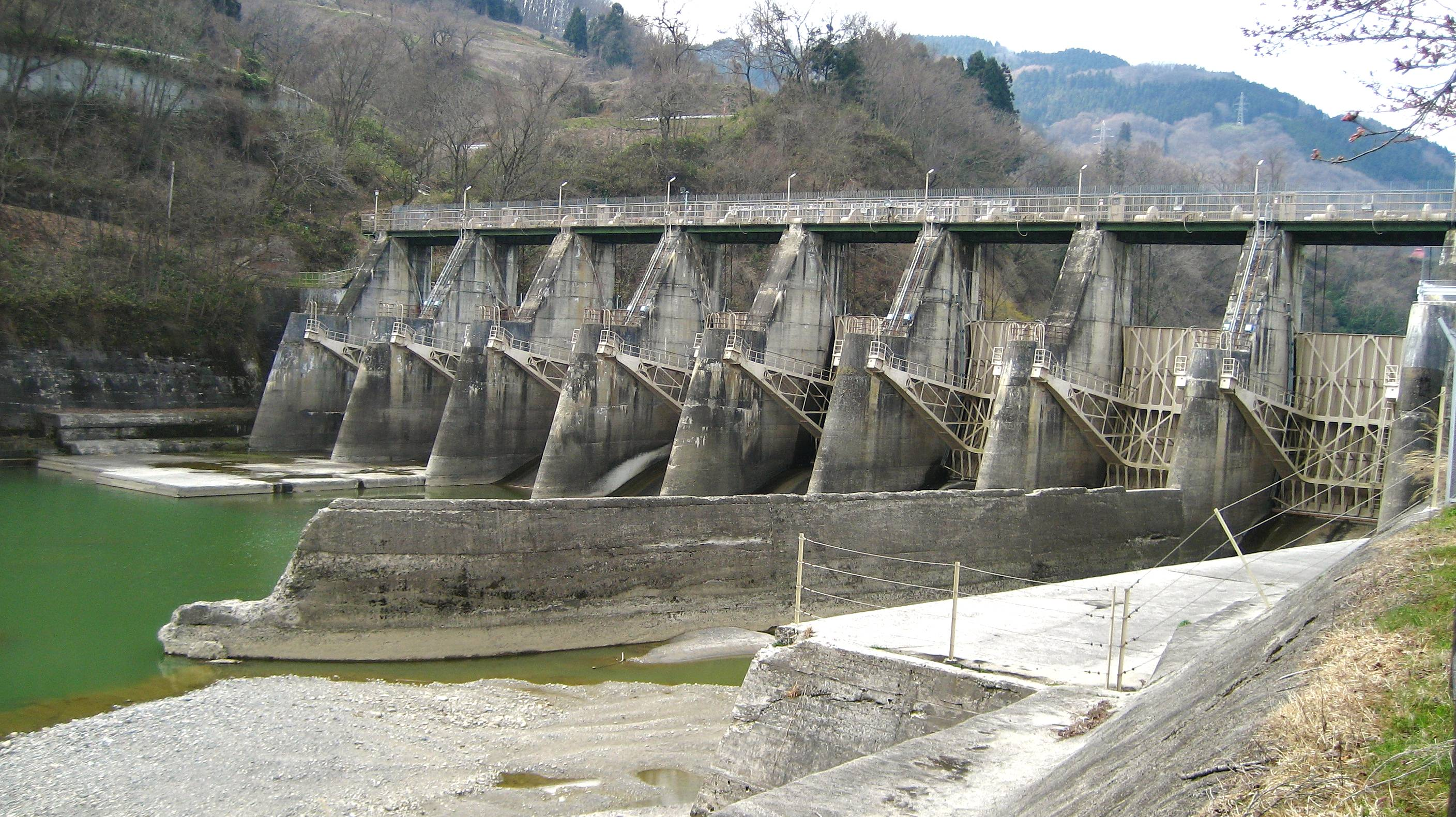
- Interactive map of Sasadaira Dam
- Location: Nagano Prefecture, Japan
- Coordinates: 36°36′26″N 138°04′56″E

Sasadaira Dam (笹平ダム) is a dam in Nagano Prefecture, Japan, completed in 1954.
