= Otakigawa Dam =

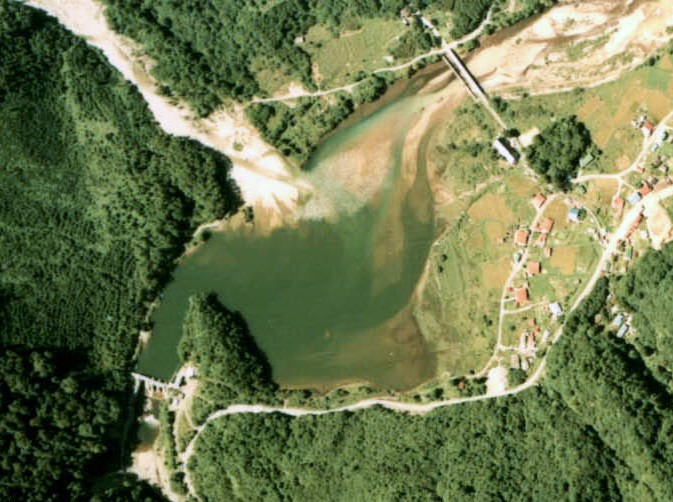
- Interactive map of Otakigawa Dam
- Location: Nagano Prefecture, Japan
- Coordinates: 35°48′25″N 137°27′22″E

Otakigawa Dam (Japanese: 王滝川ダム) is a dam in the Nagano Prefecture, Japan.
