= Tokiwa Dam (Nagano) =

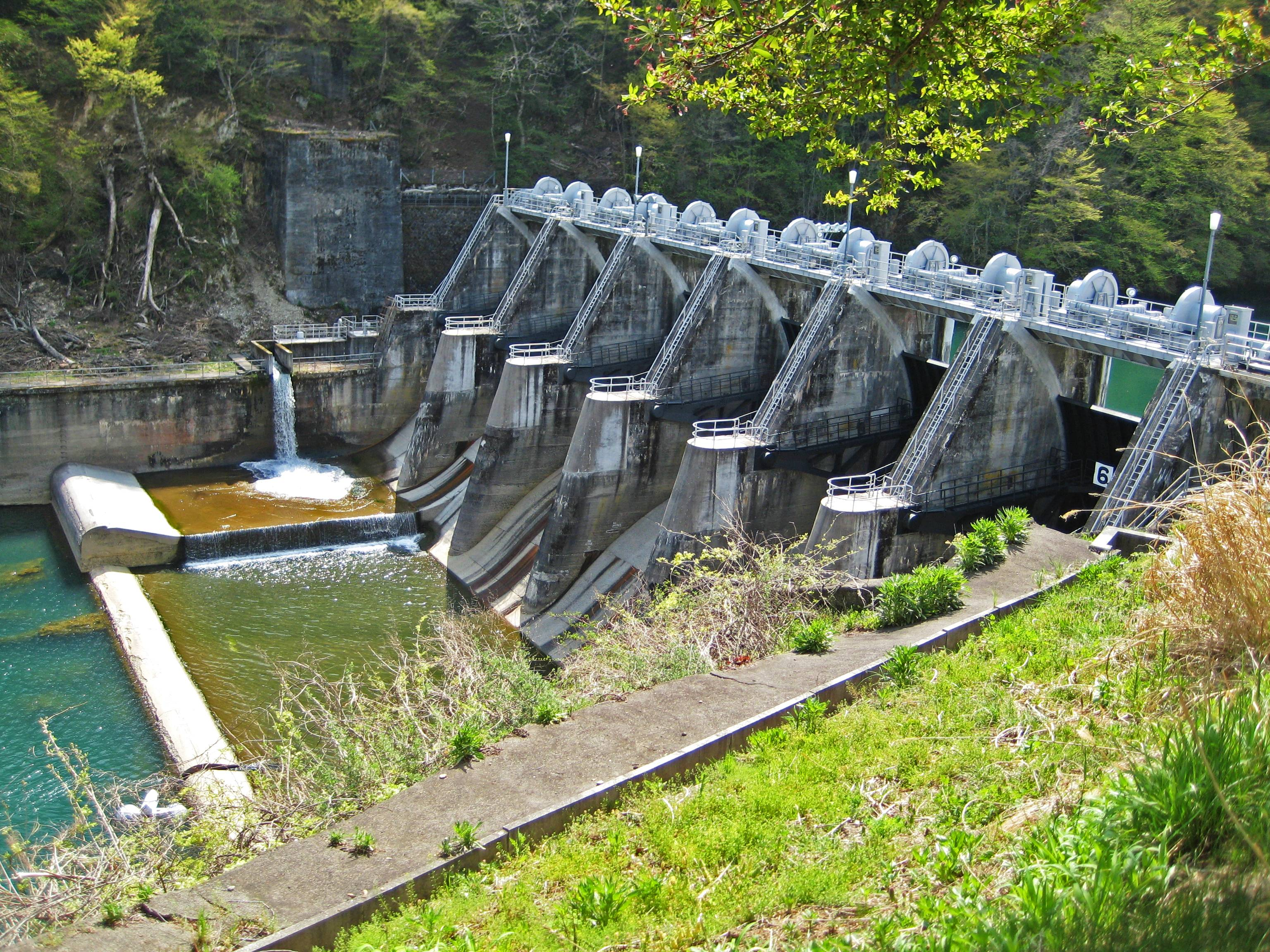
- Interactive map of Tokiwa Dam
- Location: Nagano Prefecture, Japan
- Coordinates: 35.8392°N 137.6251°E

Tokiwa Dam (Japanese: 常盤ダム) is a dam in the Nagano Prefecture, Japan, completed in 1941.
