= Yoji Dam =

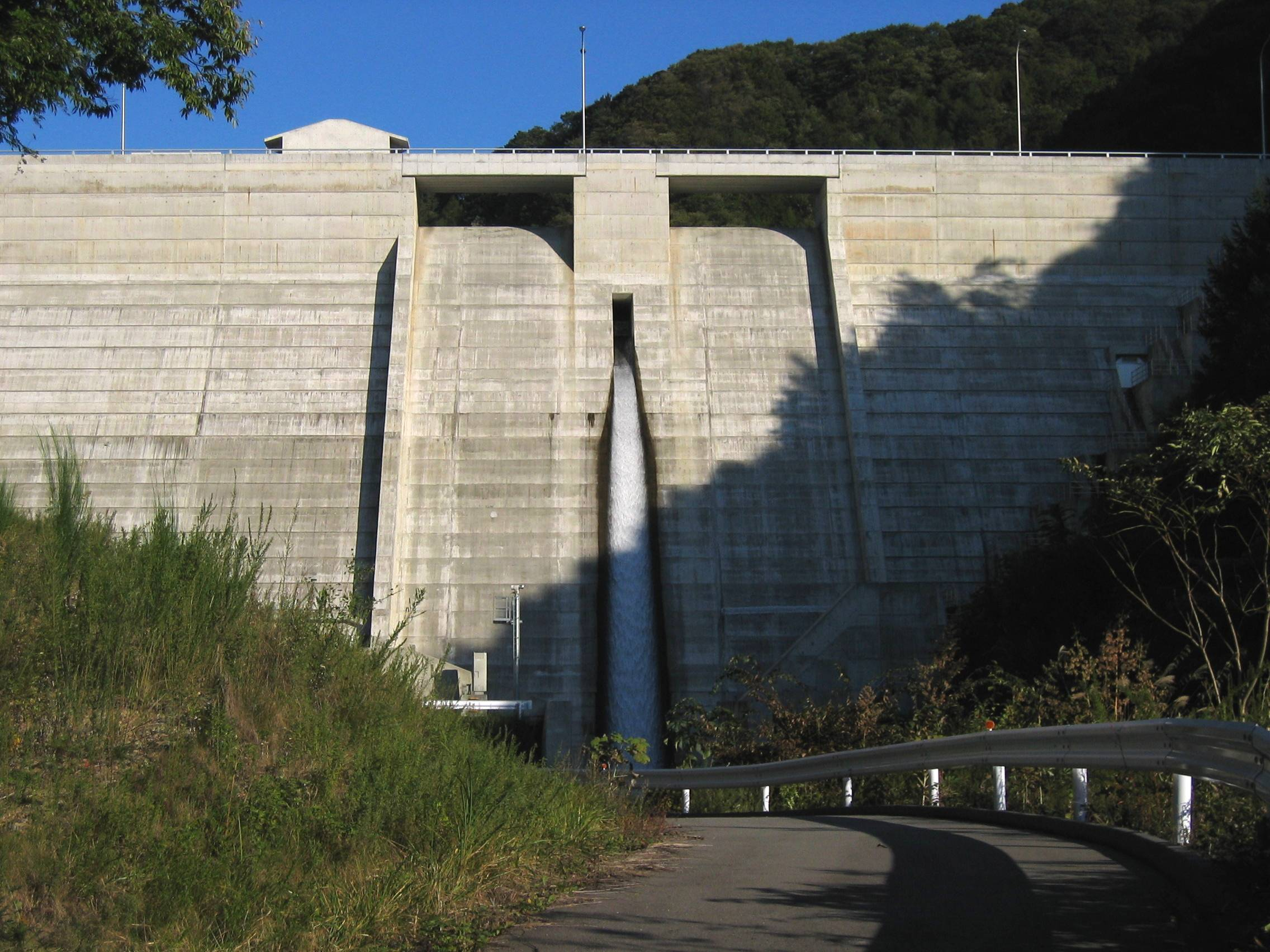
- Interactive map of Yoji Dam
- Location: Nagano Prefecture, Japan
- Coordinates: 36°09′36″N 138°33′59″E

Yoji Dam (Japanese: 余地ダム) is a dam in the Nagano Prefecture, Japan, completed in 2003.
