= Tatsugasawa Dam =

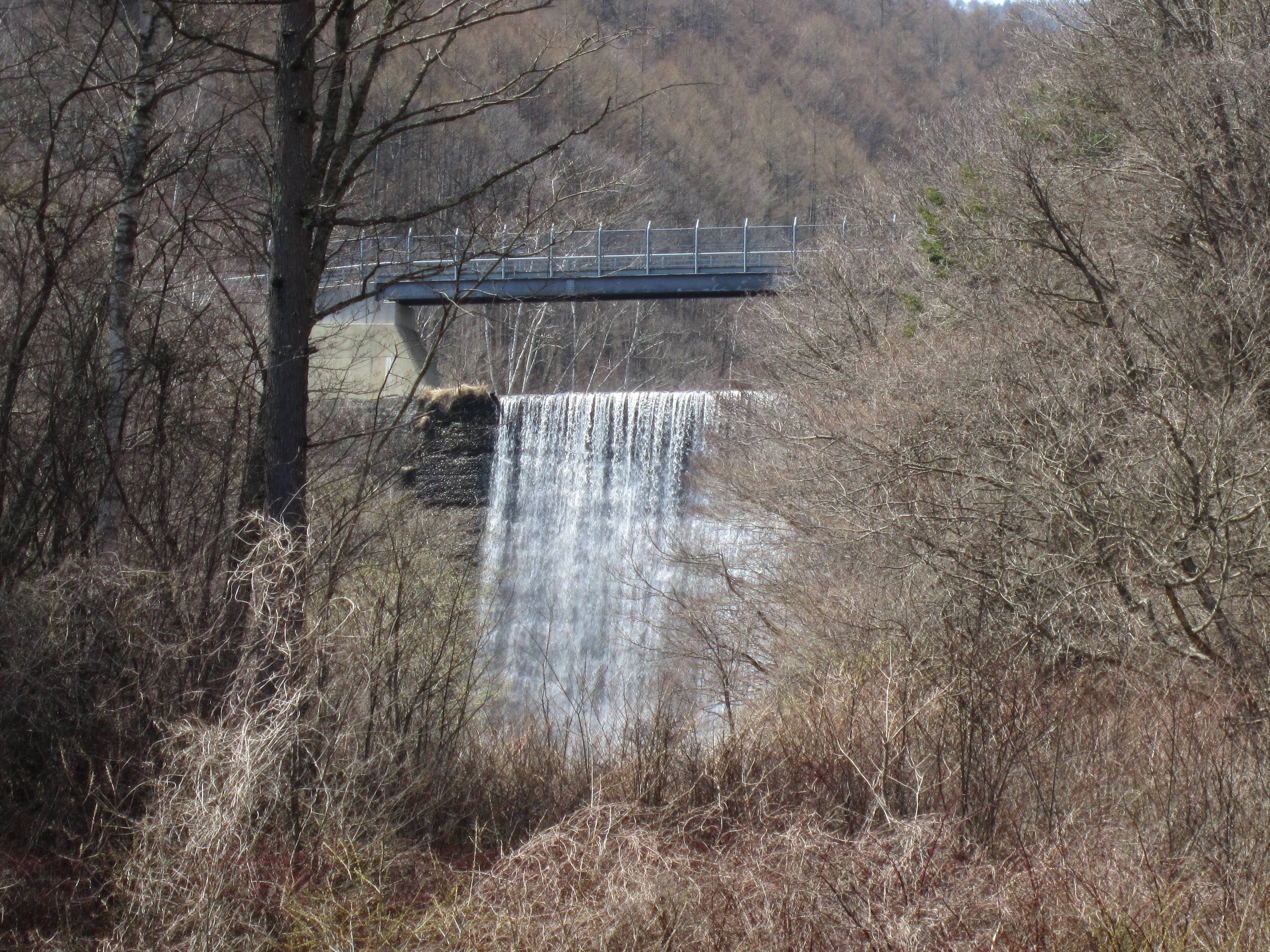
- Location: Nagano Prefecture, Japan

Tatsugasawa Dam (Japanese: 竜ヶ沢ダム) is a dam in the Nagano Prefecture, Japan.
