= Narai Dam =

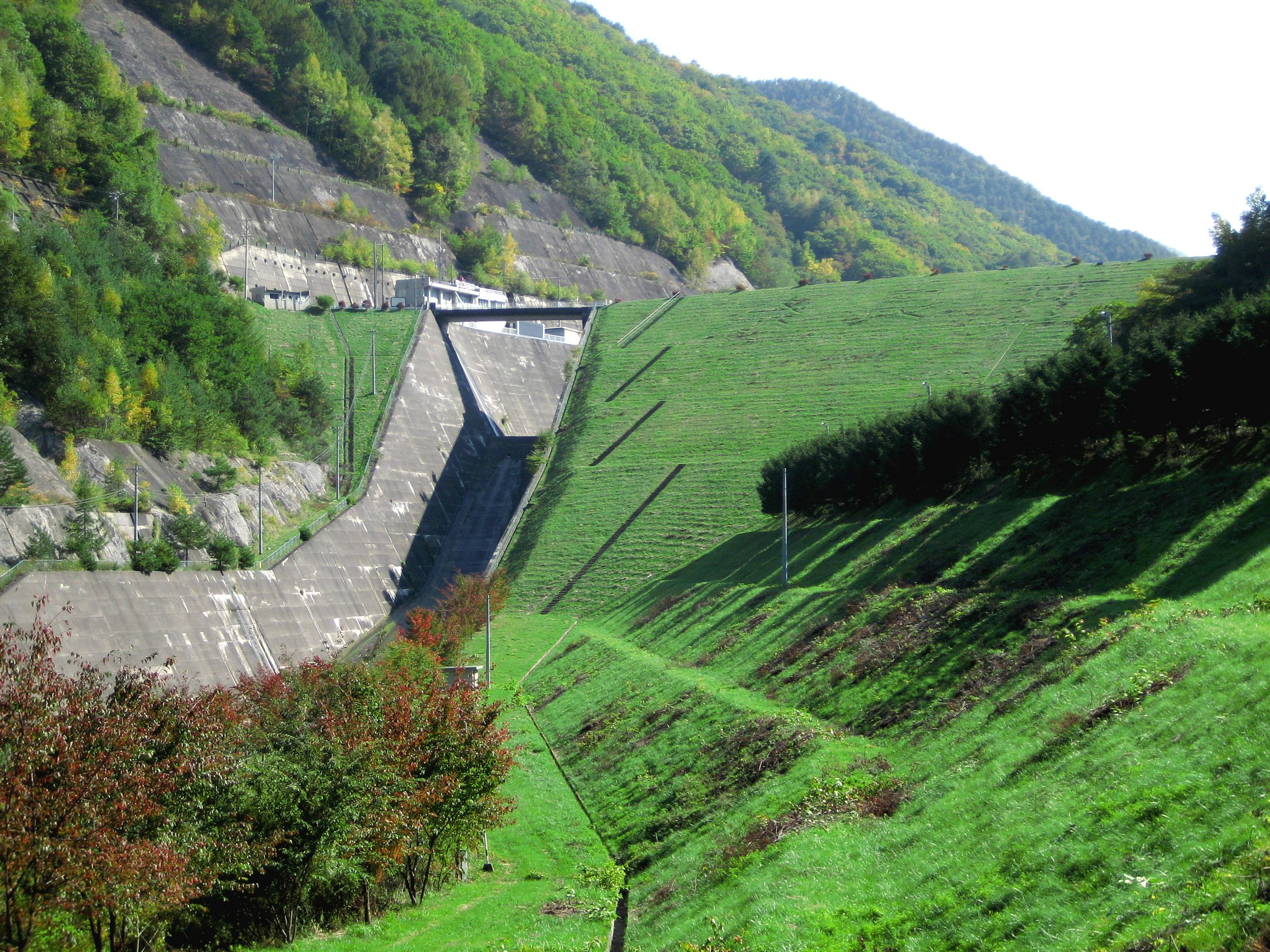
- Interactive map of Narai Dam
- Location: Nagano Prefecture, Japan
- Coordinates: 35°56′06″N 137°48′31″E

Narai Dam (Japanese: 奈良井ダム) is a dam in the Nagano Prefecture, Japan, completed in 1982.
