= Yatategi Sabo Dam =

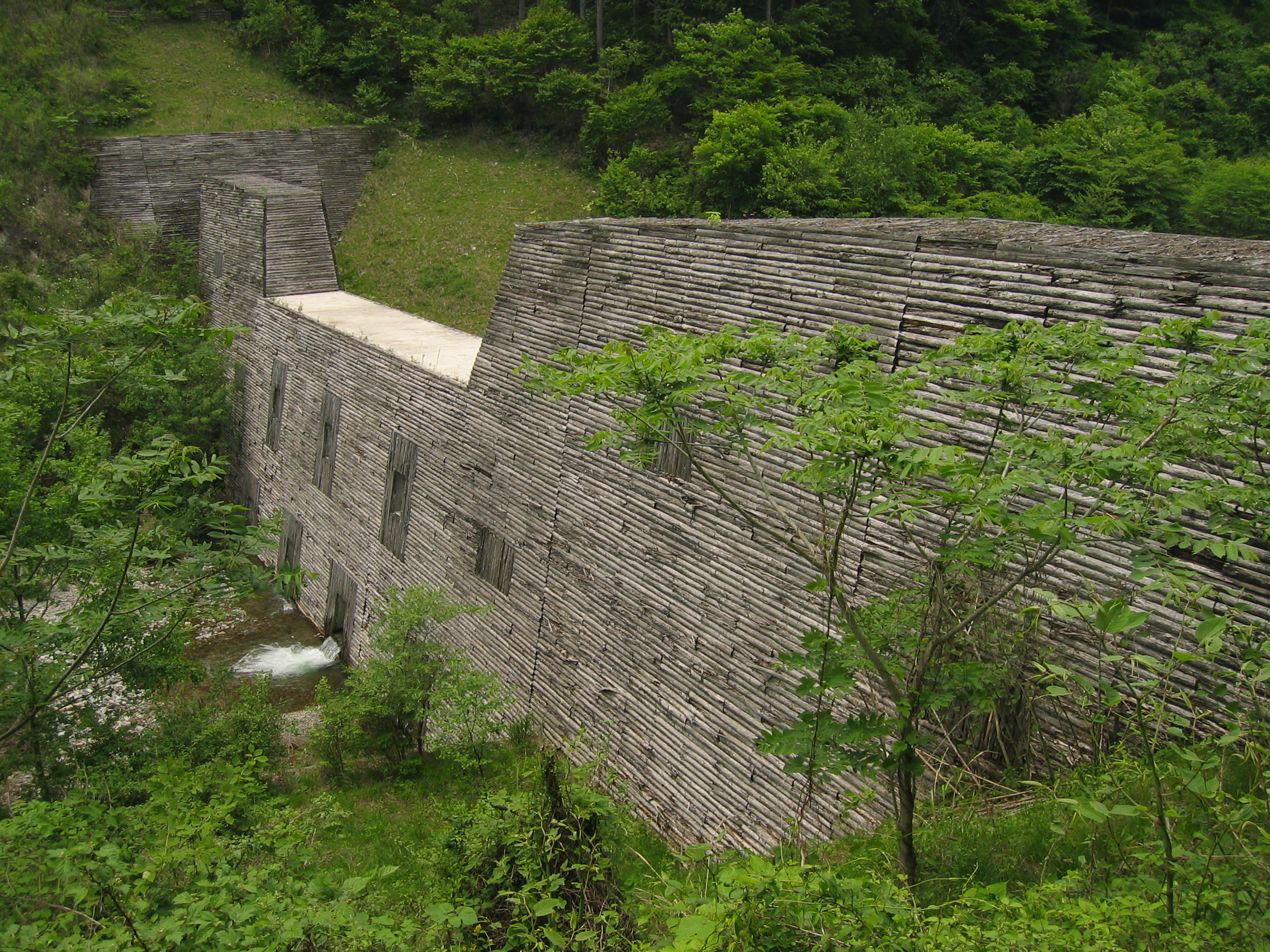
- Location: Nagano Prefecture, Japan

Yatategi Sabo Dam (Japanese: 矢立木砂防ダム) is a dam in the Nagano Prefecture, Japan.
