= Miure Dam =

Miure (Miura) Dam
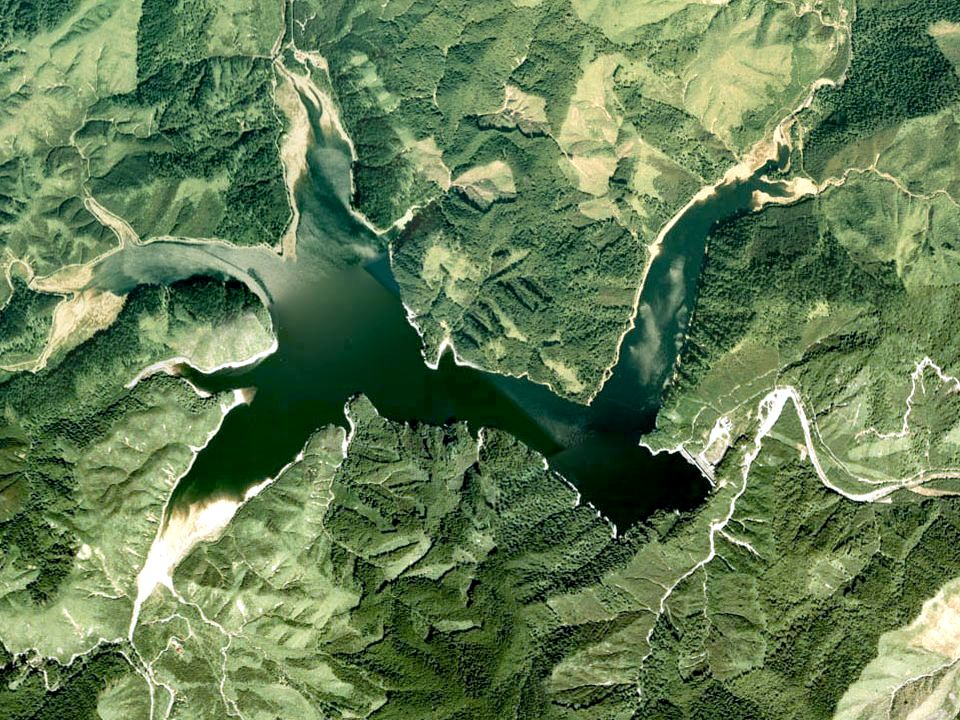
- Interactive map of Miure (Miura) Dam
- Location: Nagano Prefecture, Japan
- Coordinates: 35°49′27″N 137°23′38″E
- Construction began: 1932
- Opening date: 1945

Dam and spillways
- Height: 83.2 m (273 ft)
- Width (crest): 290m
- Dam volume: 507 thousand m3

Reservoir
- Total capacity: 62216 thousand m3
- Catchment area: 73.4km2
- Surface area: 280ha

Power Station
- Turbines: Gravity Hydropower

Miure (Miura) Dam is a dam in the Nagano Prefecture, Japan, completed in 1945.
