= Yamaguchi Dam (Nagano) =

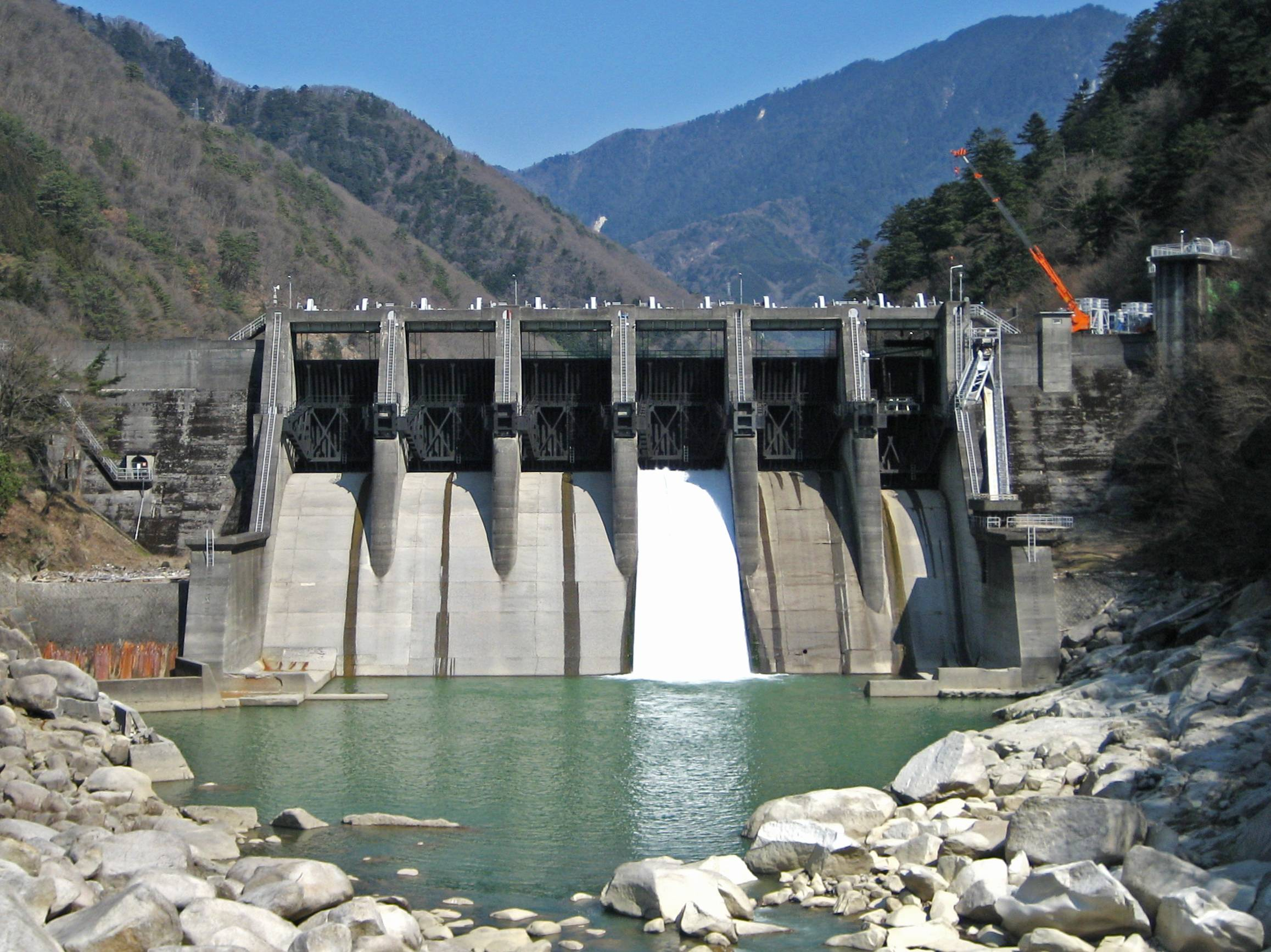
- Interactive map of Yamaguchi Dam
- Location: Nagano Prefecture, Japan
- Coordinates: 35°35′12″N 137°34′13″E

Yamaguchi Dam (Japanese: 山口ダム) is one of a dozen or so dams on the Kiso River in the Nagano Prefecture, Japan. It was completed in 1957.

== Trivia ==
The word yamaguchi (山口) means "Mountain Pass", and is a common place name in Japan. There are several dams with this name; for a list, see ja:山口ダム

The corresponding word in Chinese, written with the same characters, is read shankou. There are at least 2 dams in China with Shankou in their names:

- Burqin Shankou Dam
- Haba River Shankou Dam
