= Ikuta Dam =

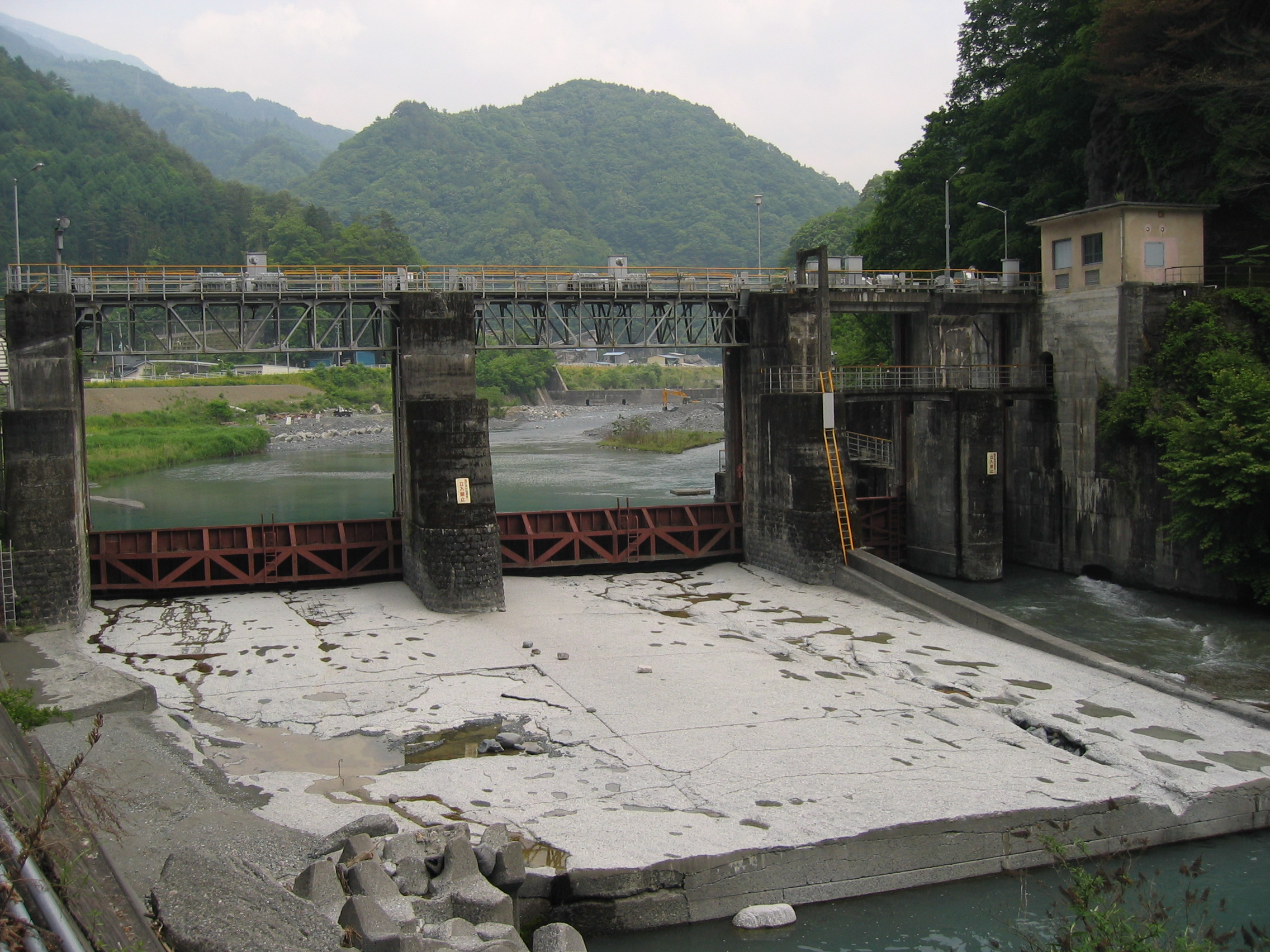
- Location: Nagano Prefecture, Japan

Ikuta Dam (Japanese: 生田ダム) is a dam in Nagano Prefecture, Japan. It was completed in 1940 and is operated by the Chubu Electric Power Company.

== See also ==
- List of dams in Japan
