= Kiso Dam =

Coordinates: 35°49′11″N 137°40′40″E

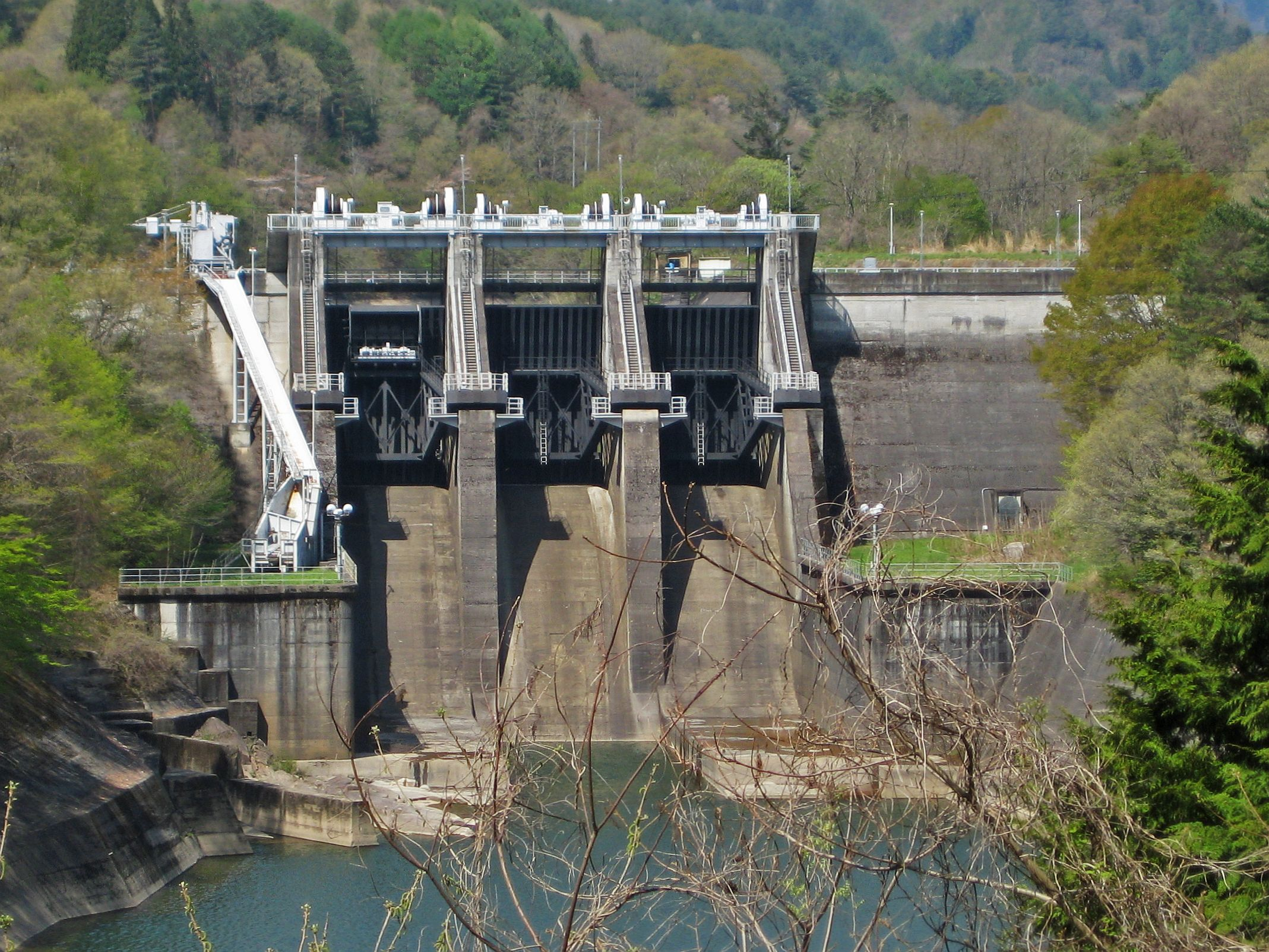
- Interactive map of Kiso Dam
- Official name: 木曽ダム
- Location: Nagano Prefecture, Japan
- Purpose: Power
- Construction began: 1963
- Opening date: 1968; 58 years ago
- Operator: Kansai Electric Power Company

Dam and spillways
- Type of dam: Gravity dam
- Impounds: Kiso River

Reservoir
- Catchment area: 578.9 km² (223.5 mi²)

Kiso Power Plant Nezame Power Plant
- Operator: Kansai Electric Power Company
- Installed capacity: 116MW; 25MW

Kiso Dam (Japanese: 木曽ダム) is a dam in the Nagano Prefecture, Japan, completed in 1968.
