= Tokiwa Dam (Hokkaido) =

Dam in Hokkaido Prefecture, Japan

- Location within Japan
- Location: Hokkaido Prefecture, Japan
- Coordinates: 43°6′13″N 140°56′01″E
- Construction began: 1969
- Opening date: 1971

Dam and spillways
- Height: 20.1 m (66 ft)
- Length: 120 m (390 ft)

Reservoir
- Total capacity: 500,000 m^{3} (18,000,000 cu ft)
- Catchment area: 23 km^{2} (8.9 sq mi)
- Surface area: 9 hectares (22 acres)

Tokiwa Dam (Japanese: 常盤ダム) is a gravity dam located in Hokkaido Prefecture in Japan. The dam is used for water supply. The catchment area of the dam is 23 km^{2}. The dam impounds about 9 ha of land when full and can store 500 thousand cubic meters of water. The construction of the dam was started on 1969 and completed in 1971.
