= Yukawa Dam =

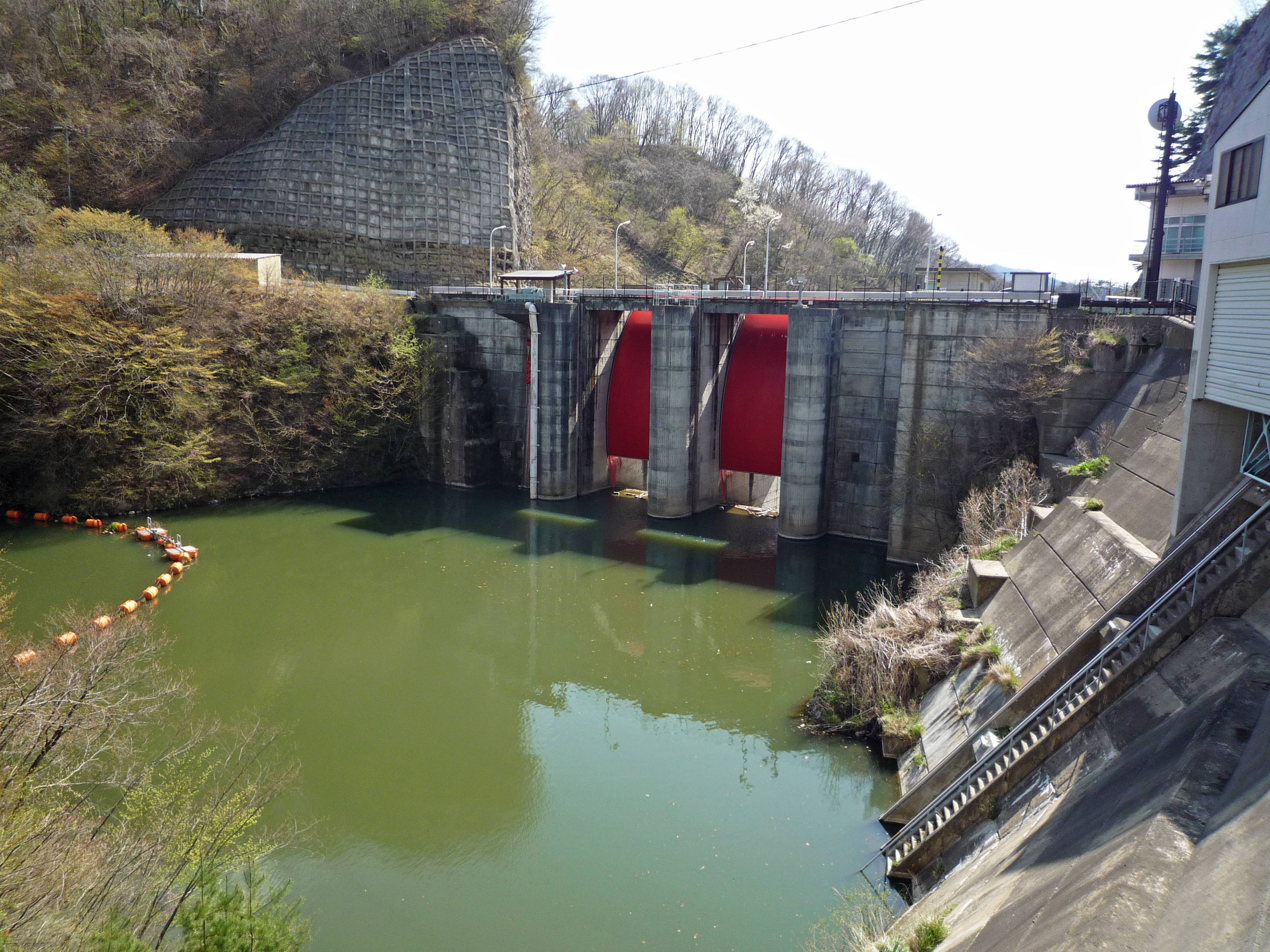
- Interactive map of Yukawa Dam
- Location: Nagano Prefecture, Japan
- Coordinates: 36°18′35″N 138°32′36″E

Yukawa Dam (Japanese: 湯川ダム) is a dam in the Nagano Prefecture, Japan, completed in 1977.
