= Minakata Dam =

Dam in Nagano, Japan

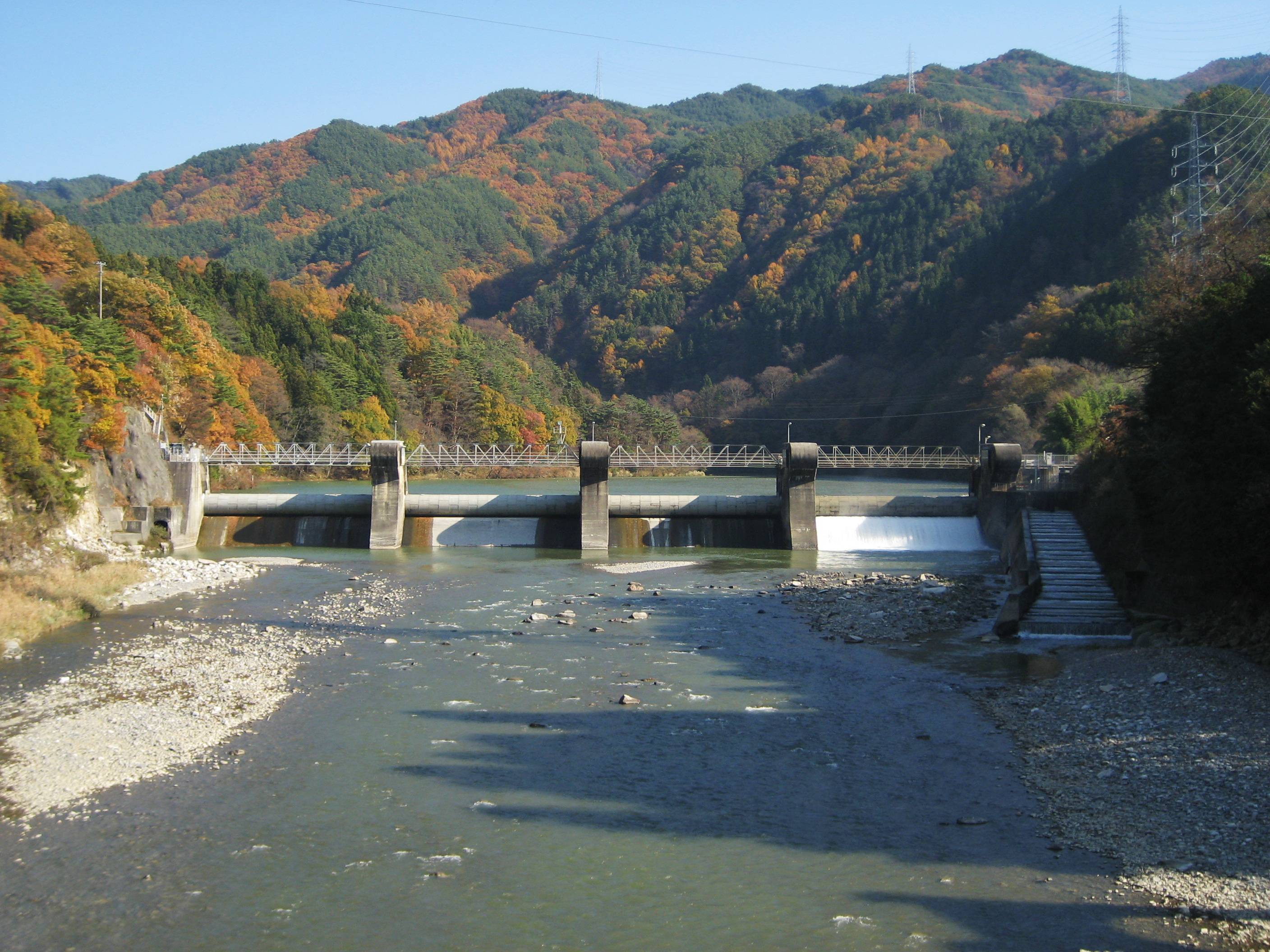
- Interactive map of Minakata Dam
- Location: Nagano Prefecture, Japan
- Coordinates: 35°42′12″N 137°57′27″E

Minakata Dam (Japanese: 南向ダム) is a dam in the Nagano Prefecture, Japan.
