= Lake Kutsuzawa Dam =

Lake Kutsuzawako Dam
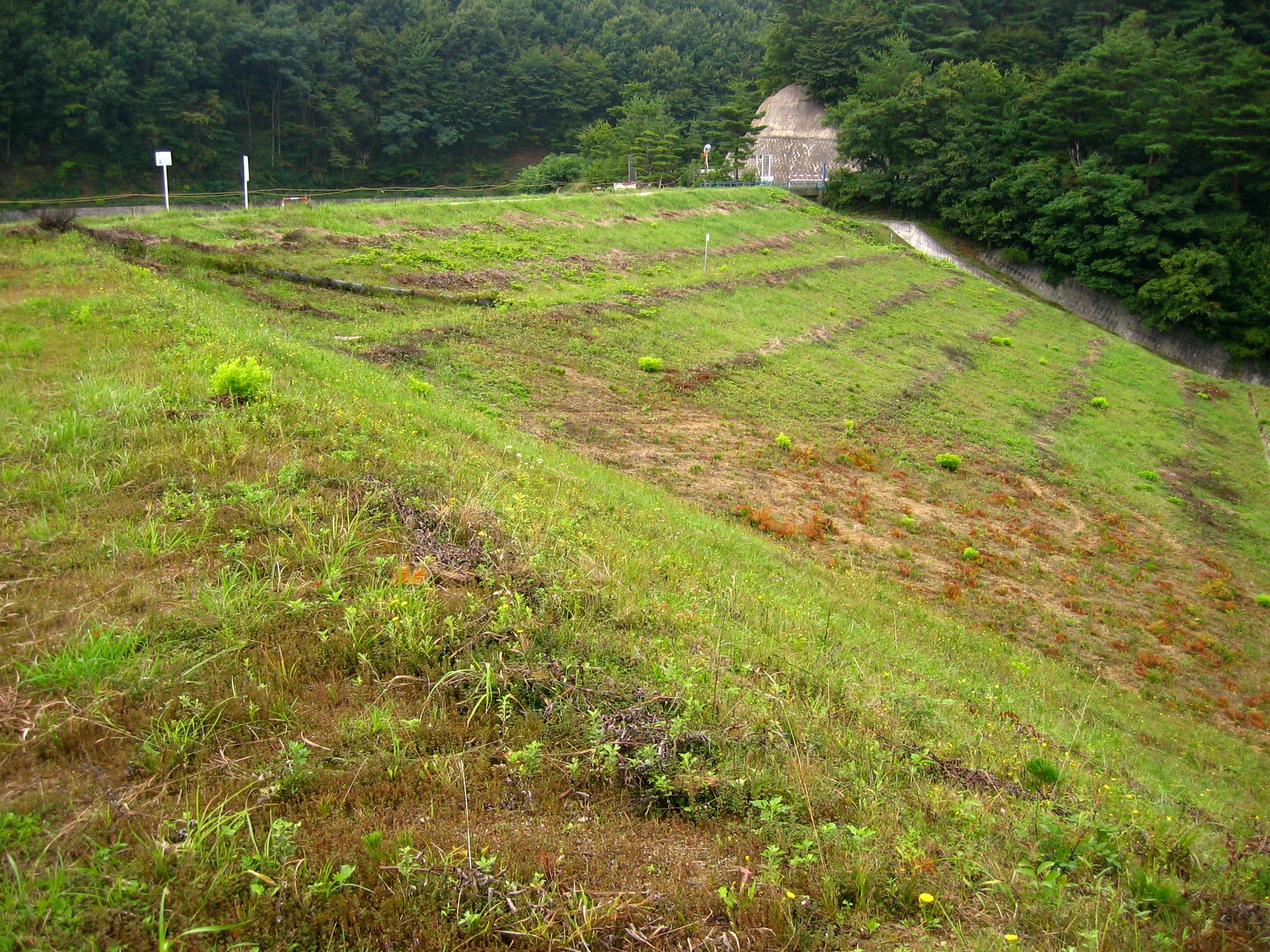

- Location within Japan
- Location: Shiojiri, Nagano, Japan
- Coordinates: 36°6′53″N 137°54′12″E

Reservoir
- Creates: Lake Kutsuzawa

Lake Kutsuzawa Dam (沓沢池ダム, Kutsuzawa-ike damu) is a dam and lake in Shiojiri, Nagano Prefecture, Japan, completed in 1953.
