= Matsukawa Dam =

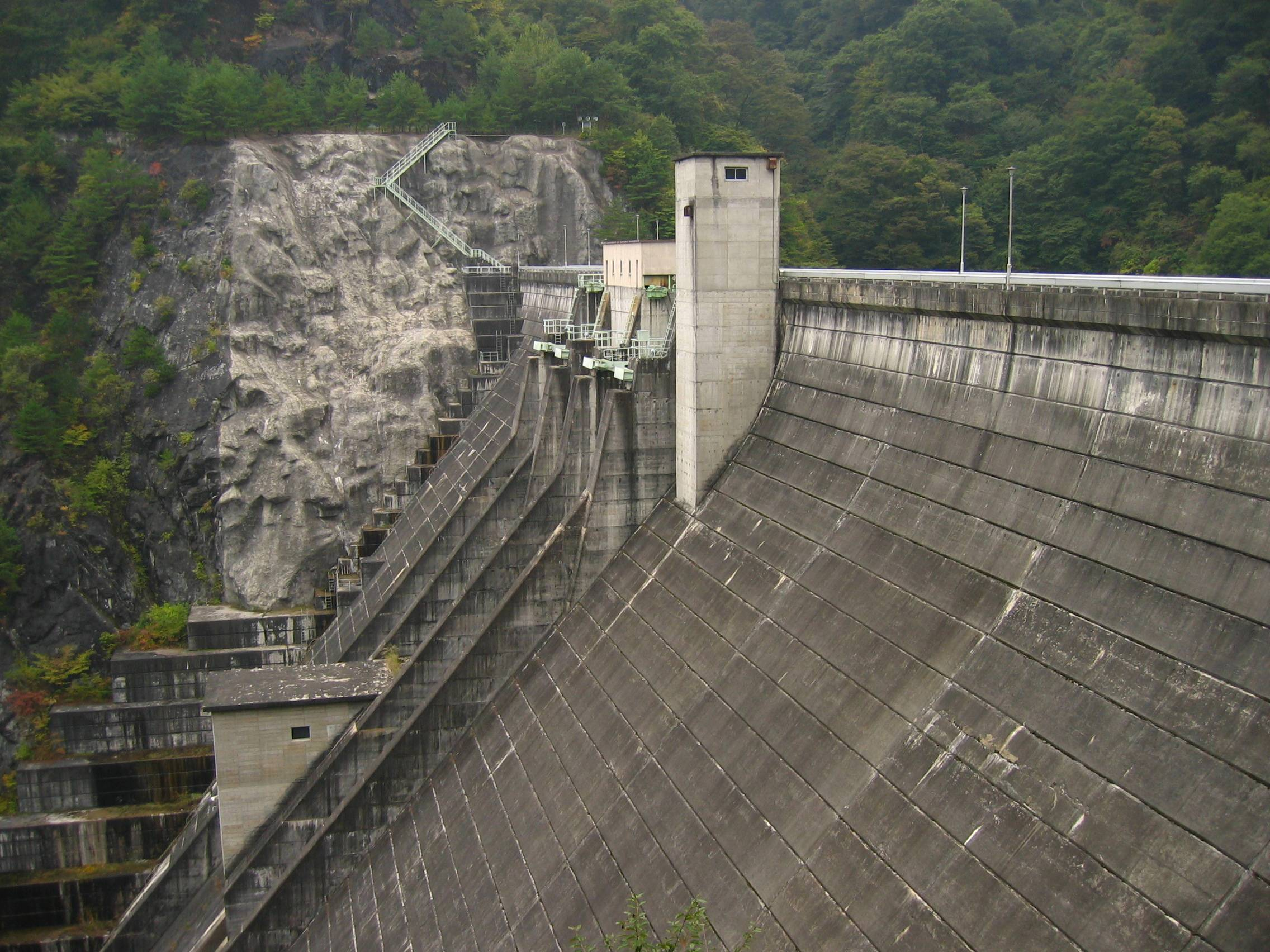
- Interactive map of Matsukawa Dam
- Location: Nagano Prefecture, Japan
- Coordinates: 35°31′52″N 137°46′41″E

Matsukawa Dam (Japanese: 松川ダム) is a dam in the Nagano Prefecture, Japan, completed in 1974.
