= Mizukami Dam =

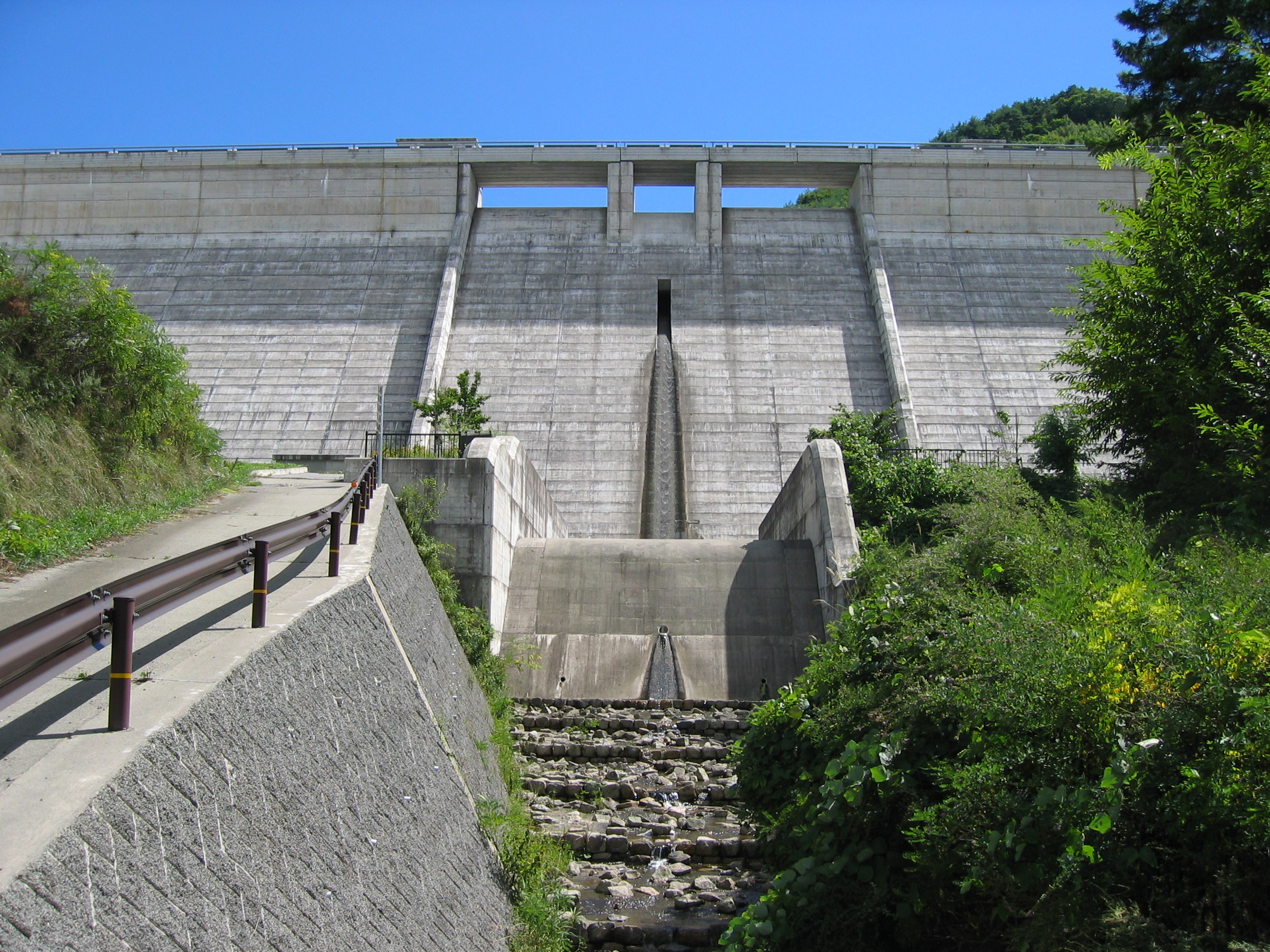
- Interactive map of Mizukami Dam
- Location: Nagano Prefecture, Japan
- Coordinates: 36°21′01″N 138°02′23″E

Mizukami Dam (Japanese: 水上ダム) is a dam in the Nagano Prefecture, Japan, completed in 2000.
