= Uchimura Dam =

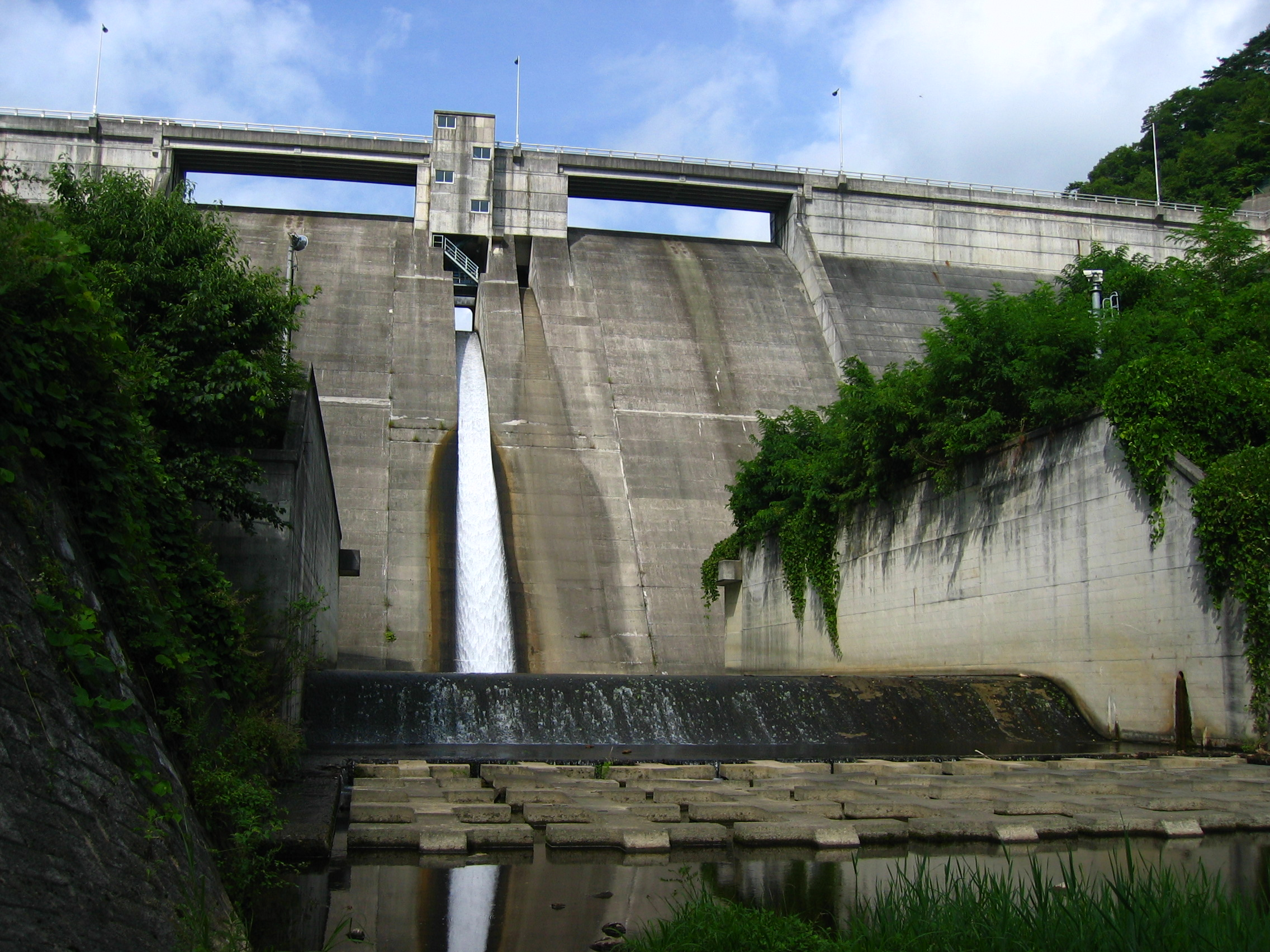
- Interactive map of Uchimura Dam
- Location: Nagano Prefecture, Japan
- Coordinates: 36°17′35″N 138°06′39″E

Uchimura Dam (Japanese: 内村ダム) is a dam in the Nagano Prefecture, Japan, completed in 1985.
