= Katagiri Dam =

Coordinates: 35°37′15″N 137°51′27″E

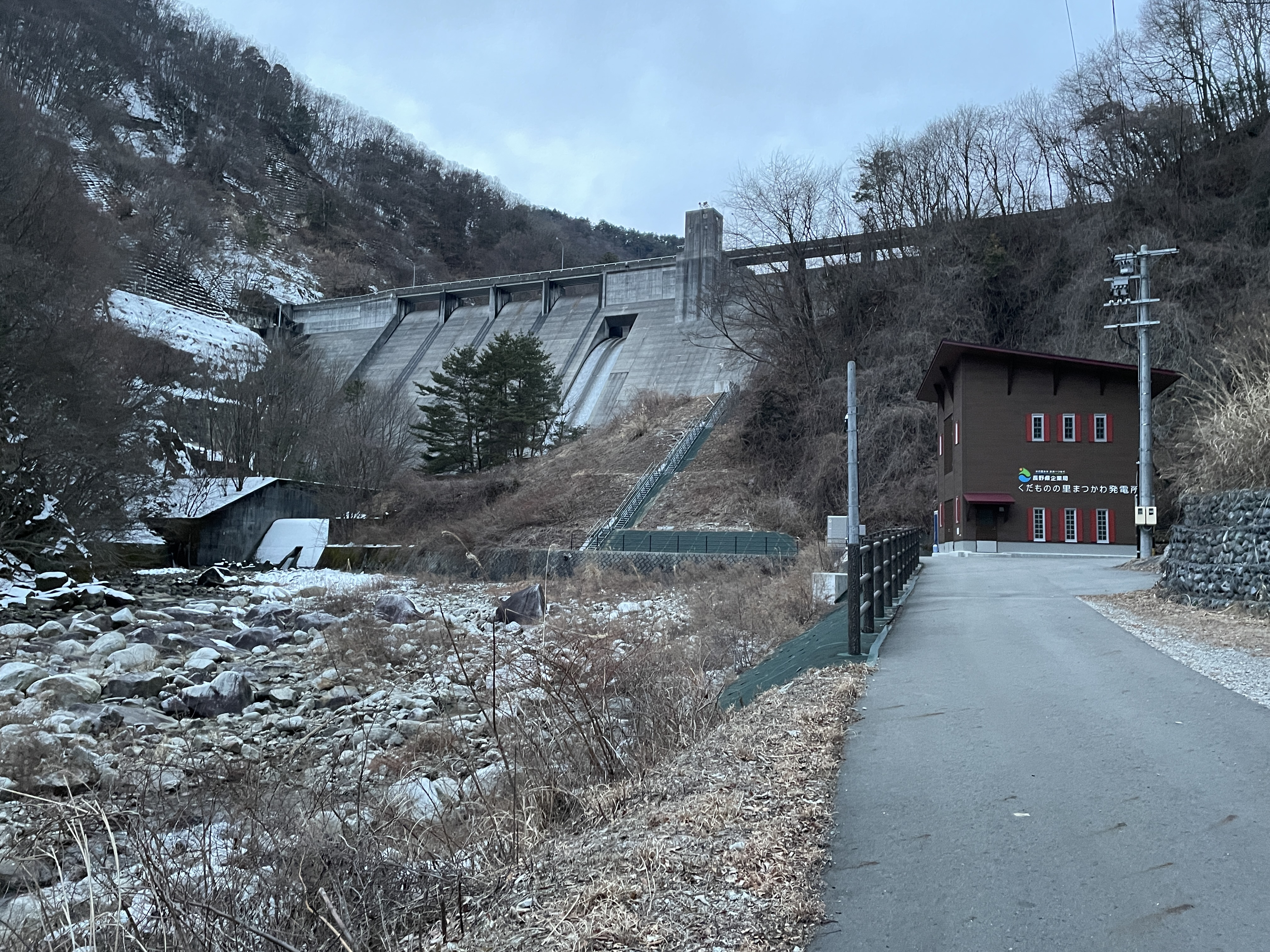
- Interactive map of Katagiri Dam
- Official name: 片桐ダム
- Location: Nagano Prefecture, Japan
- Purpose: Flood control
- Construction began: 1976
- Opening date: 1989
- Construction cost: 13.9 billion yen
- Owner: Nagano Prefecture

Dam and spillways
- Type of dam: Gravity dam
- Impounds: Tenryū River
- Height (foundation): 59.2 m (194.2 ft)

Reservoir
- Creates: Matsukawa Lake
- Catchment area: 15.1 km² (5.8 mi²)

Katagiri Dam (Japanese: 片桐ダム) is a dam in the Nagano Prefecture, Japan, completed in 1989.
