= Yokokawa Dam =

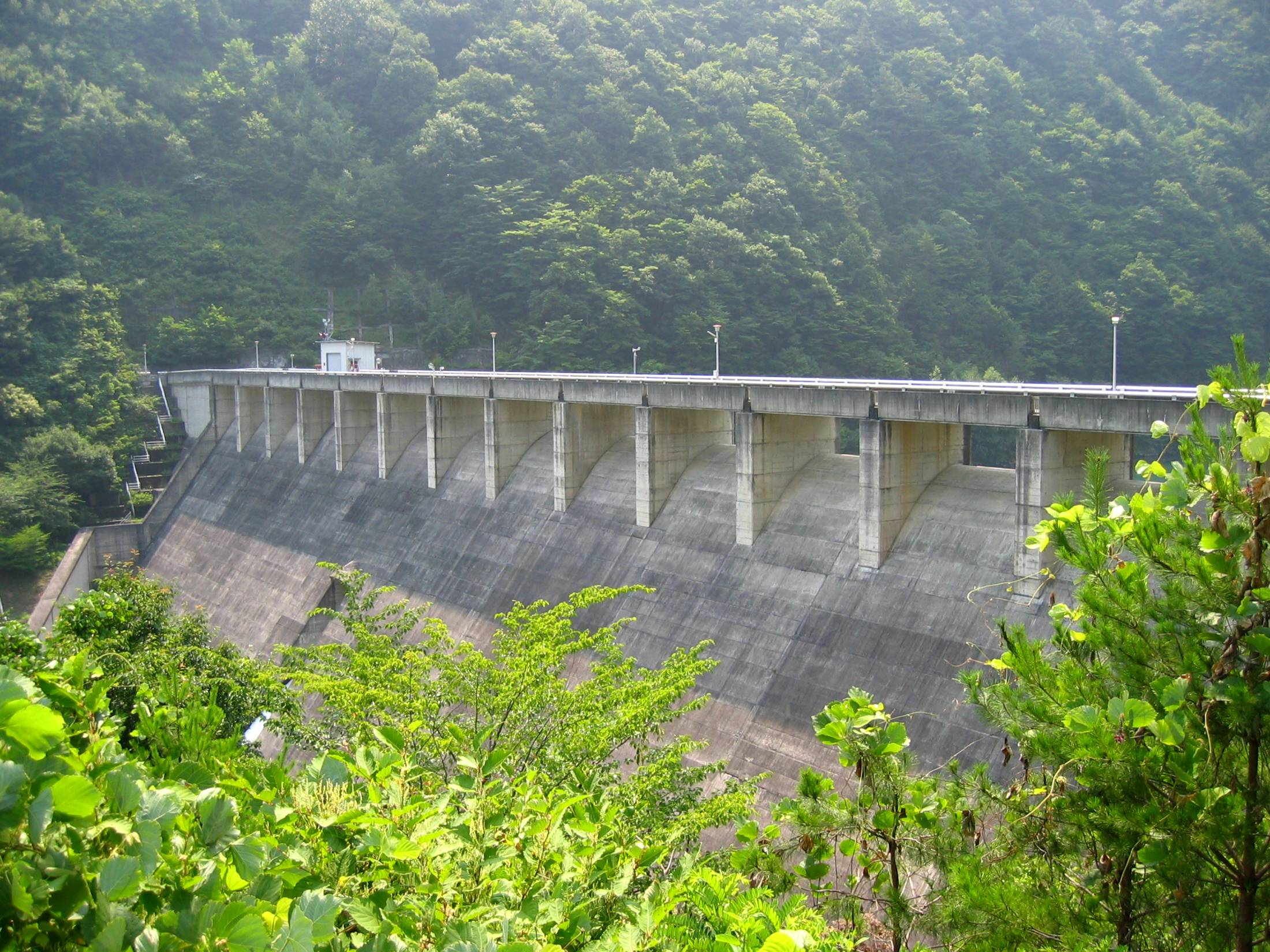
- Interactive map of Yokokawa Dam
- Location: Nagano Prefecture, Japan
- Coordinates: 38.0368°N 139.8238°E

Yokokawa Dam (Japanese: 横川ダム) is a dam in the Nagano Prefecture, Japan, completed in 1986.
