= Miyada =

Miyada 宮田村
- Village
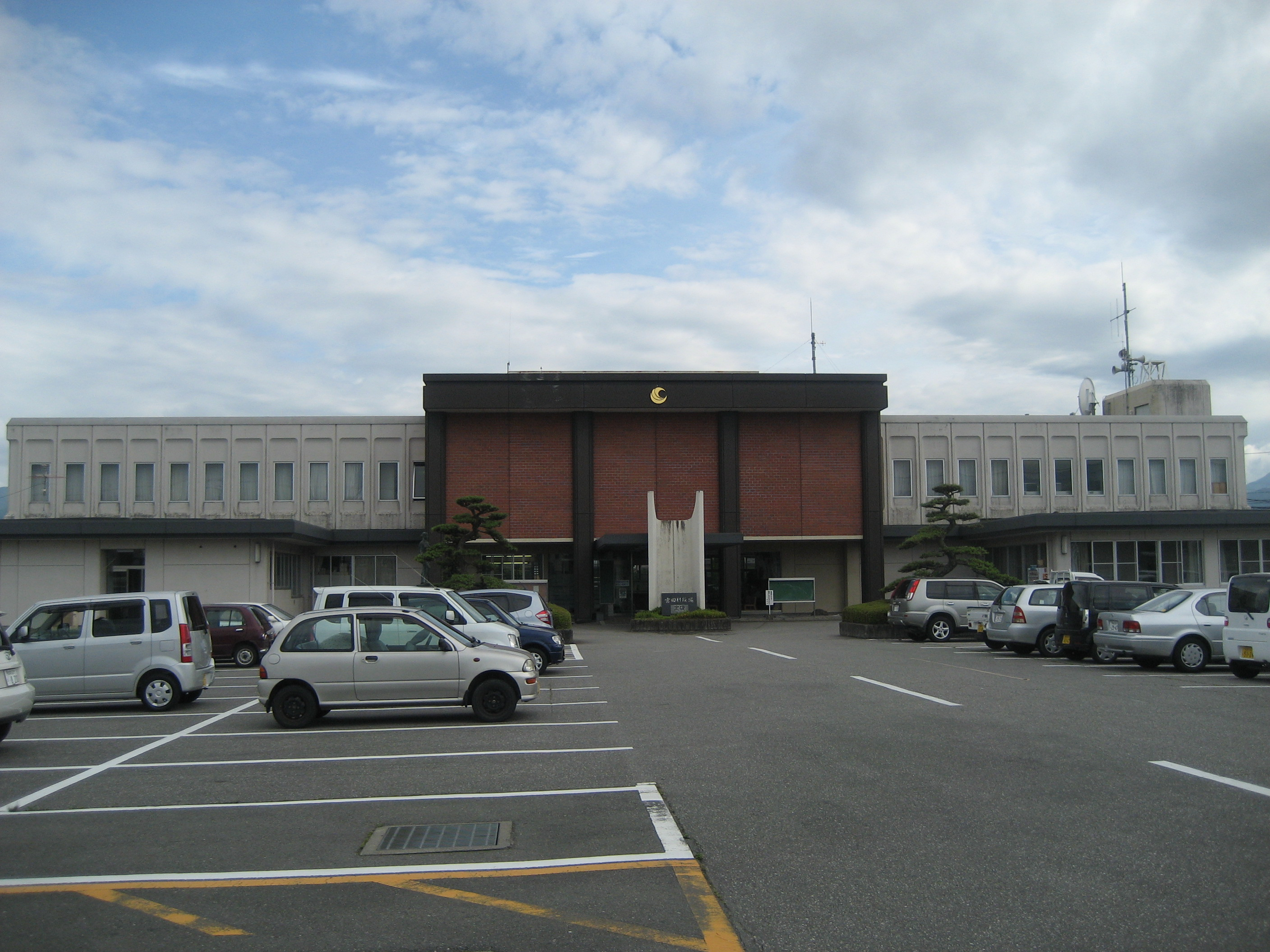
- Miyada Village Hall

- Flag Seal

- Location of Miyada in Nagano Prefecture

- Coordinates: 35°46′7.9″N 137°56′39.6″E
- Country: Japan
- Region: Chūbu (Kōshin'etsu)
- Prefecture: Nagano
- District: Kamiina

Area
  - Total: 54.50 km^{2} (21.04 sq mi)

Population (April 2019)
  - Total: 9,051
  - Density: 166.1/km^{2} (430.1/sq mi)
- Time zone: UTC+9 (Japan Standard Time)
- Symbols
  - Flower: Prunus mume
- Phone number: 0265-85-3181
- Address: 98 banchi, Miyada-mura, Kamiina-gun, Nagano-ken 399-4301
- Website: Official website

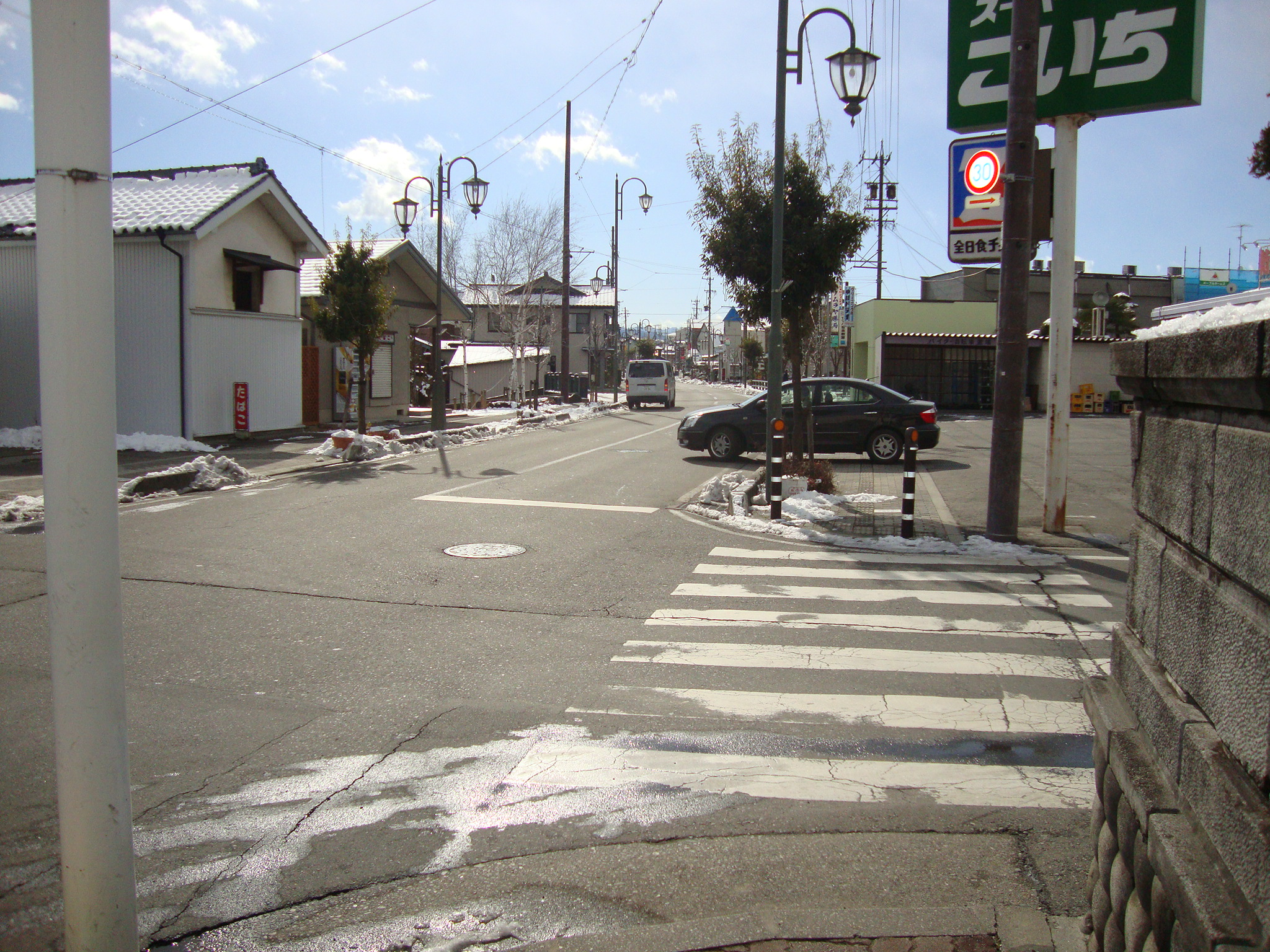
Miyada village in Nagano prefecture, Japan

Miyada (宮田村, Miyada-mura) is a village located in Nagano Prefecture, Japan. As of 1 April 2019, the village had an estimated population of 9,051 in 3439 households, and a population density of 170 persons per km^{2}. The total area of the village is 54.50 square kilometres (21.04 sq mi).

== Geography ==
Miyada is located in the Kiso Mountains of central Nagano Prefecture, with Mount Kisokoma (2956 meters) within the village limits. The Tenryū River flows through the village.

=== Surrounding municipalities ===
- Nagano Prefecture
  - Agematsu
  - Ina
  - Kiso
  - Komagane

=== Climate ===
Due to its location in the Kiso Mountains, the village has a climate characterized by characterized by cool summers and severely cold winters (Köppen climate classification Dfb). The average annual temperature in Miyada is 5.5 °C. The average annual rainfall is 1974 mm with September as the wettest month. The temperatures are highest on average in August, at around 18.1 °C, and lowest in January, at around -6.6 °C.

== Demographics ==
Per Japanese census data, the population of Miyada has recently plateaued after a long period of growth.

Historical population
Year	Pop.	±%
1960	6,142	—
1970	6,767	+10.2%
1980	7,582	+12.0%
1990	7,894	+4.1%
2000	8,692	+10.1%
2010	8,973	+3.2%
2020	8,569	−4.5%

== History ==
The area of present-day Miyada was part of ancient Shinano Province and "Miyada" appears as a place name in the Heian period Engishiki. During the Edo period it was a post station n the Shio no Michi highway. The modern village was founded on September 30, 1956 by separating from the city of Komagane.

== Education ==
Miyada has one public elementary school and one public middle school operated by the village government. The village does not have a high school.

== Transportation ==
=== Railway ===
- Central Japan Railway Company - Iida Line
  - Miyada

=== Highway ===
- National Route 153
