= Shio no Michi =

Old road built on Honshu Island, Japan

The location of Shinano Province within Japan.

Shio no Michi (塩の道, Salt Road) was an old kaidō, or road, in ancient Japan and was used to transport salt from the ocean to the inland central Honshū. In the Middle Ages, salt was brought both from the Sea of Japan and the Pacific Ocean to Shinano Province for processing. The road leading from the Sea of Japan to Shinano Province was called the Chikuni Kaidō (千国街道), whereas the road leading from the Pacific Ocean was called the Sanshū Kaidō (三州街道).

== Stations of the Chikuni Kaidō ==
On the Echigo Province side of the route, it was called the Itoigawa Kaidō, but on the Shinano Province side, it was called Chikuni Kaidō. The Sawado-juku and Sano-juku pair and the Ida-juku and Imori-juku pair each essentially functioned as one post station.

=== Niigata Prefecture ===
1. Itoigawa-juku (糸魚川宿) (Itoigawa)
2. Yamaguchi-juku (山口宿) (Itoigawa)

=== Nagano Prefecture ===
3. Ōami-juku (大網宿) (Otari)
4. Kuruma-juku (来馬宿) (Otari)
5. Chikuni-juku (千国宿) (Otari)
6. Shiojima Shinden-juku (塩島新田宿) (Hakuba)
7. Iida-juku (飯田宿) and Iimori-juku (飯森宿) (Hakuba)
8. Sawado-juku (沢度宿) and Sano-juku (佐野宿) (Hakuba)
9. Uminokuchi-juku (海ノ口宿) (Ōmachi)
10. Ōmachi-juku (大町宿) (Ōmachi)
11. Ikeda-juku (池田宿) (Ikeda)
12. Hotaka-juku (保高宿) (Azumino)
13. Nariai Shinden-juku (成相新田宿) (Azumino)
14. Matsumoto-juku (松本宿) (Matsumoto)

== Stations of the Sanshū Kaidō ==
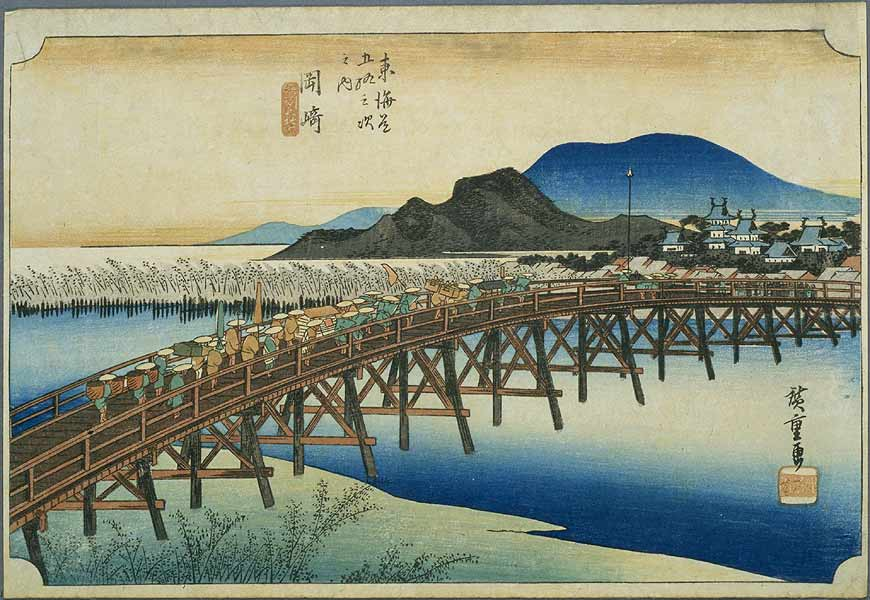
Okazaki-juku in the 1830s, as depicted by Hiroshige in The Fifty-three Stations of the Tōkaidō

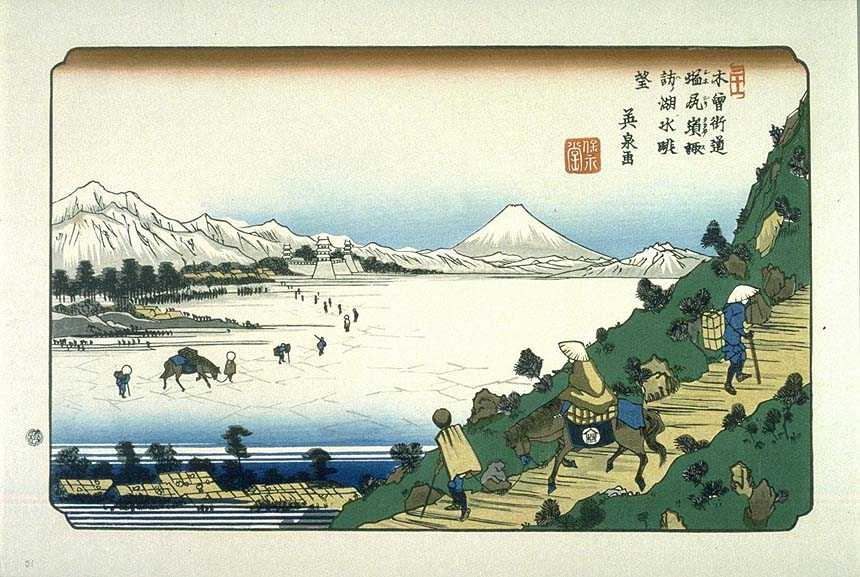
Keisai Eisen's print of Shiojiri-shuku, part of The Sixty-nine Stations of the Kiso Kaidō series

The salt was initially carried from Mikawa Bay by boats traveling up the Yahagi River and its tributary, the Tomoe River. From Toyota, it was carried by horse, marking the start of the Sanshū Kaidō.

=== Aichi Prefecture ===
1. Okazaki-shuku (岡崎宿) (Okazaki) (also part of the Tōkaidō)
2. Kugyūdaira-juku (九久平宿) (Toyota)
3. Asuke-juku (足助宿) (Toyota)
4. Busetsu-juku (武節宿) (Toyota)

=== Nagano Prefecture ===
5. Neba-juku (根羽宿) (Neba)
6. Hiraya-juku (平谷宿) (Hiraya)
7. Namiai-juku (浪合宿) (Namiai)
8. Komaba-juku (駒場宿) (Achi)
9. Iida-juku (飯田宿) (Iida)
10. Ichida-juku (市田宿) (Takamori)
11. Ōjima-juku (大島宿) (Matsukawa)
12. Katabora-juku (片桐宿) (Matsukawa)
13. Iijima-juku (飯島宿) (Iijima)
14. Akazu Uwabu-juku (赤須上穂宿) (Komagane)
15. Miyada-juku (宮田宿) (Miyada)
16. Inabe-juku (伊那部宿) (Ina)
17. Matsujima-juku (松島宿) (Minowa)
18. Miyagi-juku (宮木宿) (Tatsuno)
19. Ono-juku (小野宿) (Shiojiri)
20. Shiojiri-shuku (塩尻宿) (Shiojiri) (also part of the Nakasendō)

== See also ==
- Kaidō
- Edo Five Routes
- Salt road
