= Iijima Station =

Railway station in Iijima, Nagano Prefecture, Japan

Iijima Station 飯島駅
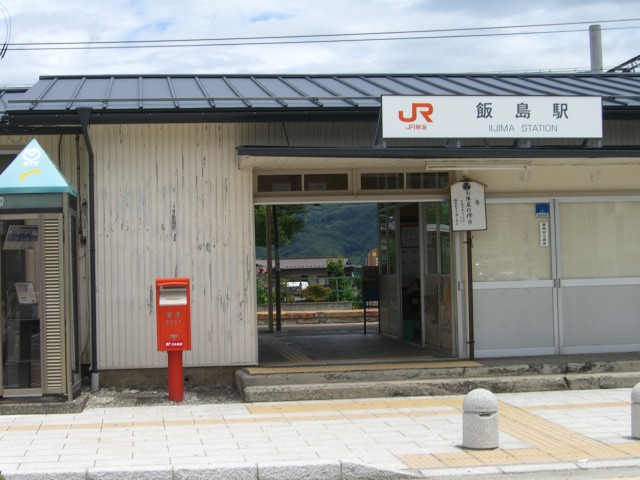
- Iijima Station in June 2008

General information
- Location: 1168 Iijima, Iijima-machi, Kamiina-gun, Nagano-ken 399-3702; Japan
- Coordinates: 35.6774°N 137.9290°E
- Elevation: 647 m (2,123 ft)
- Operator: JR Central
- Line: Iida Line
- Distance: 157.9 km from Toyohashi
- Platforms: 2 side platforms

Other information
- Status: Staffed

History
- Opened: 11 February 1918

Passengers
- FY2016: 290 (daily)
Location
- Location within Nagano Prefecture Location within Japan

Iijima Station (飯島駅, Iijima-eki) is a railway station on the Iida Line in the town of Iijima, Kamiina District, Nagano Prefecture, Japan, operated by Central Japan Railway Company (JR Central).

== Lines ==
Iijima Station is served by the Iida Line and is 157.9 kilometers from the starting point of the line at Toyohashi Station.

== Station layout ==
The station consists of two ground-level opposed side platforms connected by a level crossing.

=== Platforms ===
1	■ Iida Line	for Tatsuno
2	■ Iida Line	for Iida and Tenryūkyō

== Adjacent stations ==
«	Service	»
Iida Line
Nanakubo	Rapid Misuzu	Ina-Fukuoka
Ina-Hongō	Local	Tagiri

== History ==
Iijima Station opened on 11 February 1918. With the privatization of Japanese National Railways (JNR) on 1 April 1987, the station came under the control of JR Central.

== Passenger statistics ==
In fiscal 2016, the station was used by an average of 290 passengers daily (boarding passengers only).

== Surrounding area ==
- Iijima town hall
- Iijima Post Office
- Iijima Elementary School
- Iijima Junior High School
- National Route 153

== See also ==
- List of railway stations in Japan
