= Matsukawa, Nagano (Shimoina) =

Matsukawa 松川町
- Town
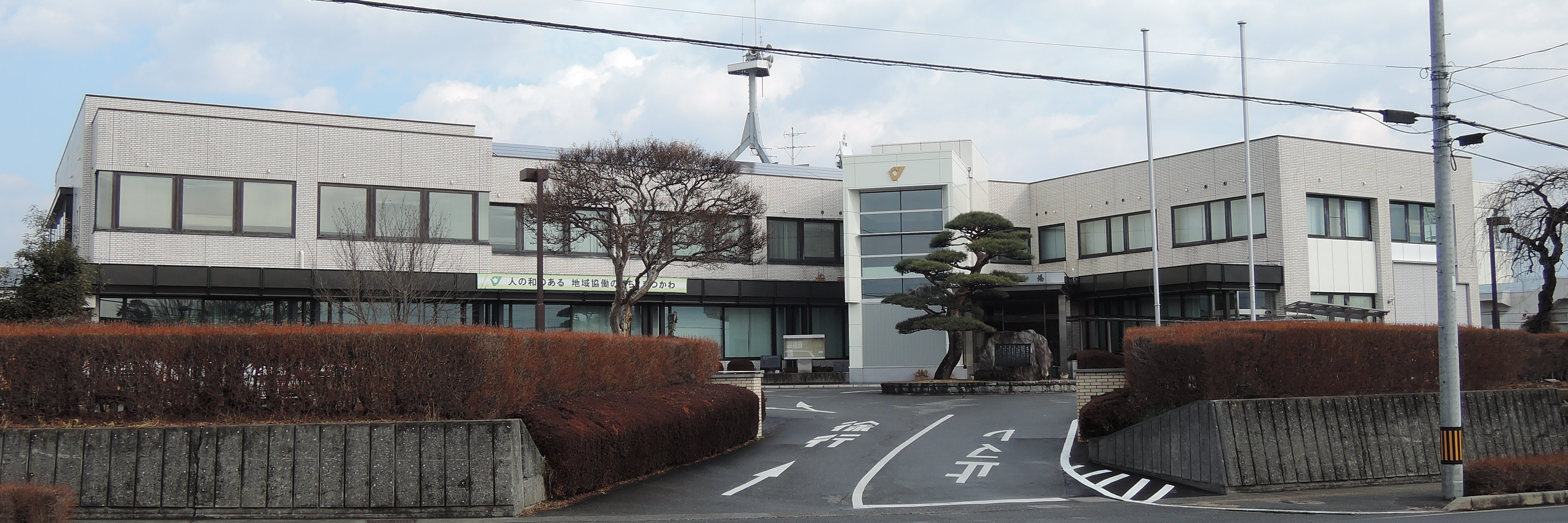
- Matsukawa Town Hall

- Flag Seal

- Location of Matsukawa in Nagano Prefecture

- Coordinates: 35°35′50″N 137°54′34.8″E
- Country: Japan
- Region: Chūbu (Kōshin'etsu)
- Prefecture: Nagano
- District: Shimoina

Area
  - Total: 72.79 km^{2} (28.10 sq mi)

Population (April 2019)
  - Total: 13,043
  - Density: 179.2/km^{2} (464.1/sq mi)
- Time zone: UTC+9 (Japan Standard Time)
- Symbols
  - Tree: Pine
  - Flower: Pyrus pyrifolia
- Phone number: 0265-36-3111
- Address: 3823 Oshima, Matsukawa-machi, Shimoina-gun, Nagano-ken 399-3303
- Website: Official website

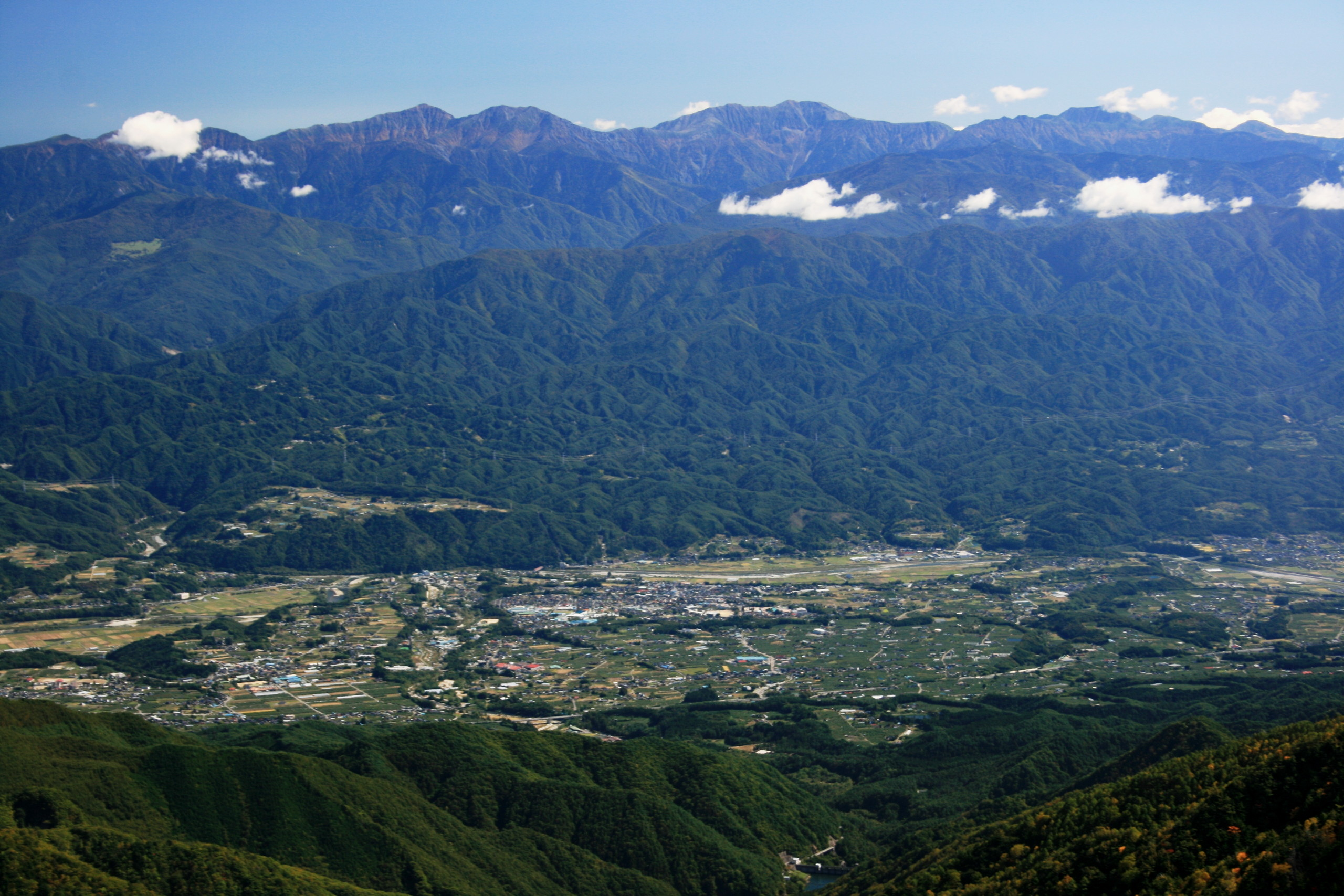
Matsukawa from Mount Eboshi

Matsukawa (松川町, Matsukawa-machi) is a town located in Nagano Prefecture, Japan. As of 1 April 2019, the town had an estimated population of 13,043 in 4364 households, and a population density of 180 persons per km^{2}. The total area of the town is 72.79 square kilometres (28.10 sq mi). Like many other small Southern Nagano villages, it is famous for its apples.

== Geography ==
Located in the Ina Basin of mountainous southern Nagano Prefecture, Matsukawa is bordered to the west by the Kiso Mountains. The town stretches for 21 kilometers east-west, but is only 6 kilometers wide north-south. The Tenryū River passes through center of the town.

=== Surrounding municipalities ===
- Nagano Prefecture
  - Iida
  - Iijima
  - Nakagawa
  - Ōshika
  - Takamori
  - Tenryū
  - Toyooka

=== Climate ===
The town has a climate characterized by hot and humid summers, and cold winters (Köppen climate classification Cfa). The average annual temperature in Matsukawa is 12.2 °C. The average annual rainfall is 1583 mm with September as the wettest month. The temperatures are highest on average in August, at around 24.65 °C, and lowest in January, at around 0.2 °C.

== Demographics ==
Per Japanese census data, the population of Matsukawa has remained relatively steady over the past 80 years.

Historical population
| Year | Pop. | ±% |
|---|---|---|
| 1940 | 11,042 | — |
| 1950 | 13,431 | +21.6% |
| 1960 | 12,595 | −6.2% |
| 1970 | 12,411 | −1.5% |
| 1980 | 13,108 | +5.6% |
| 1990 | 13,422 | +2.4% |
| 2000 | 14,070 | +4.8% |
| 2010 | 13,678 | −2.8% |
| 2020 | 12,530 | −8.4% |

== History ==
The area of present-day Matsukawa was part of ancient Shinano Province. The modern town was established on September 20, 1956 by the merger of the village of Oshima in Shimoina District with the village of Katagiri in Kamiina District

== Education ==
Matsukawa has one public elementary school, one public middle school and one public combined elementary/middle school operated by the town government. The town also has one public high school operated by the Nagano Prefectural Board of Education.

== Transportation ==
=== Railway ===
- JR Tōkai – Iida Line
  - Kamikatagiri - Ina-Ōshima

=== Highway ===
- National Route 153

== Local attractions ==
- Kataoka Dam
