= Tagiri Station =

Railway station in Iijima, Nagano Prefecture, Japan

Tagiri Station 田切駅
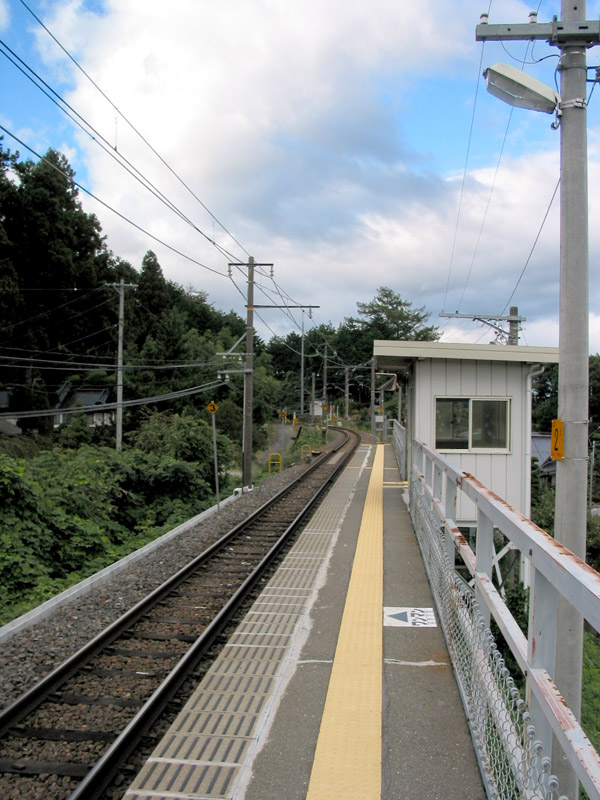
- Tagiri Station in April 2009

General information
- Location: 2795 Tagiri, Iijima-machi, Kamiina-gun, Nagano-ken 99-3701; Japan
- Coordinates: 35.6952°N 137.9337°E
- Elevation: 637 m (2,090 ft)
- Operator: JR Central
- Line: Iida Line
- Distance: 160.1 km from Toyohashi
- Platforms: 1 side platform

Other information
- Status: Unstaffed
- Website: Official website

History
- Opened: 11 February 1918

Passengers
- FY2016: 38 (daily)
Location
- Location within Nagano Prefecture Location within Japan

Tagiri Station (田切駅, Tagiri-eki) is a railway station on the Iida Line in the town of Iijima, Kamiina District, Nagano Prefecture, Japan, operated by Central Japan Railway Company (JR Central).

== Lines ==
Tagiri Station is served by the Iida Line and is 160.1 kilometers from the starting point of the line at Toyohashi Station.

== Station layout ==
The station consists of one ground-level side platform serving one bi-directional track. There is no station building, but only a shelter built on the platform. The station is unattended.

== Adjacent stations ==
«	Service	»
Iida Line
Rapid Misuzu: Does not stop at this station
Iijima	Local	Ina-Fukuoka

== History ==
Tagiri Station opened on 11 February 1918. The station was relocated June 1984 approximately 150 meters south of its original location, which was on a curve. With the privatization of Japanese National Railways (JNR) on 1 April 1987, the station came under the control of JR Central.

== Passenger statistics ==
In fiscal 2016, the station was used by an average of 38 passengers daily (boarding passengers only).

== Surrounding area ==
- National Route 153

== See also ==
- List of railway stations in Japan
