= Takato Dam =

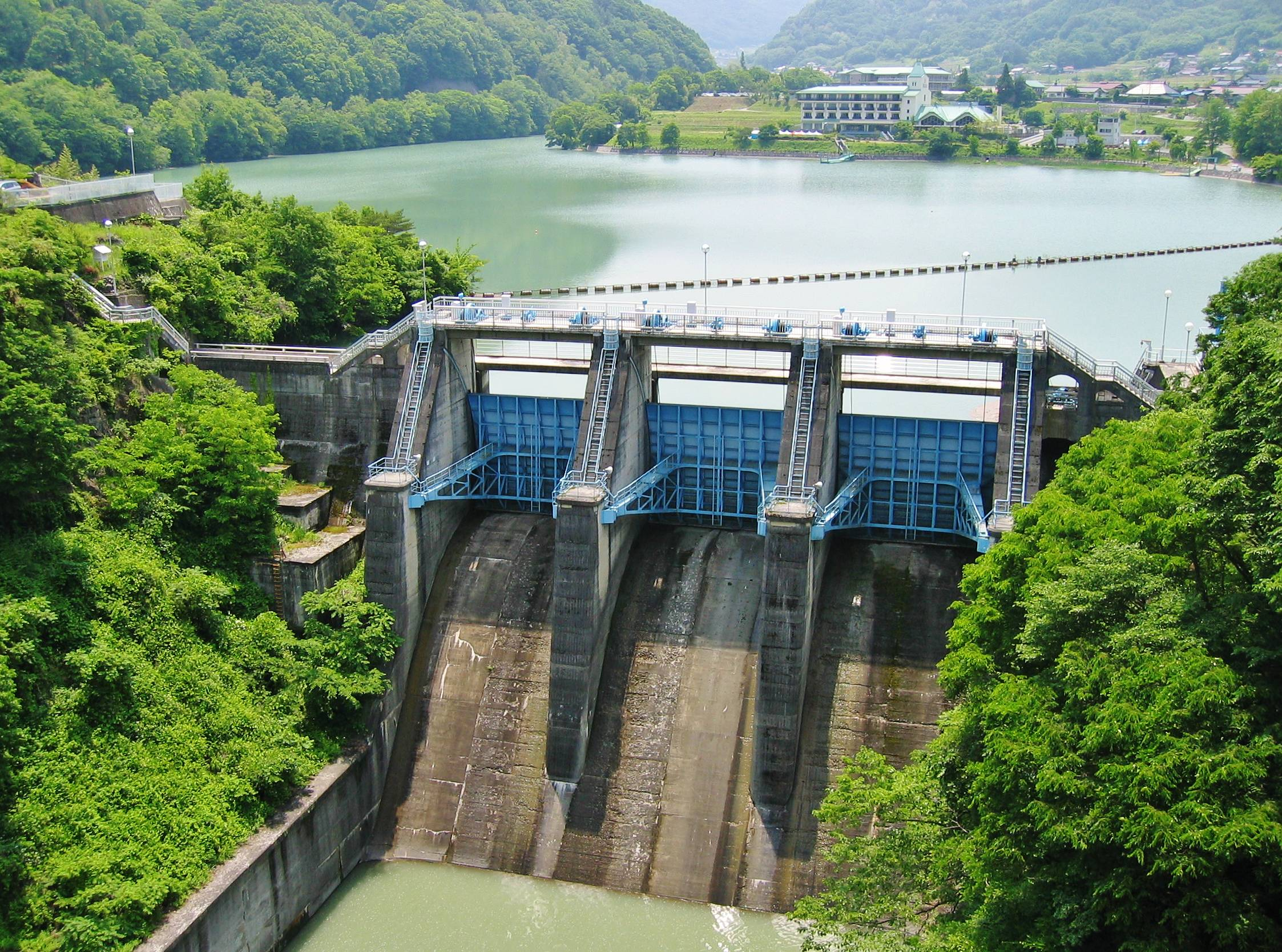
- Interactive map of Takato Dam
- Location: Nagano Prefecture, Japan
- Coordinates: 35°49′46″N 138°03′47″E

Takato Dam (Japanese: 高遠ダム) is a dam in Ina, Nagano Prefecture, Japan. It is a 30.9-meter (101 ft) high gravity-type concrete dam and a multi-purpose dam operated by Nagano Prefecture for irrigation and power generation.

== History ==
The Ministry of Construction (now the Chubu Regional Development Bureau of the Ministry of Land, Infrastructure, Transport and Tourism) began construction of the Miwa Dam in 1952 as part of the comprehensive river development project for the Mifune River. At the same time, Nagano Prefecture also planned to construct the Takato Dam downstream from the planned Miwa Dam site. Construction of the Takato Dam proceeded in 1957 concurrently with that of the Miwa Dam and was completed in 1958, slightly earlier than the Miwa Dam.
