= Ōshika, Nagano =

Ōshika 大鹿村
- Village
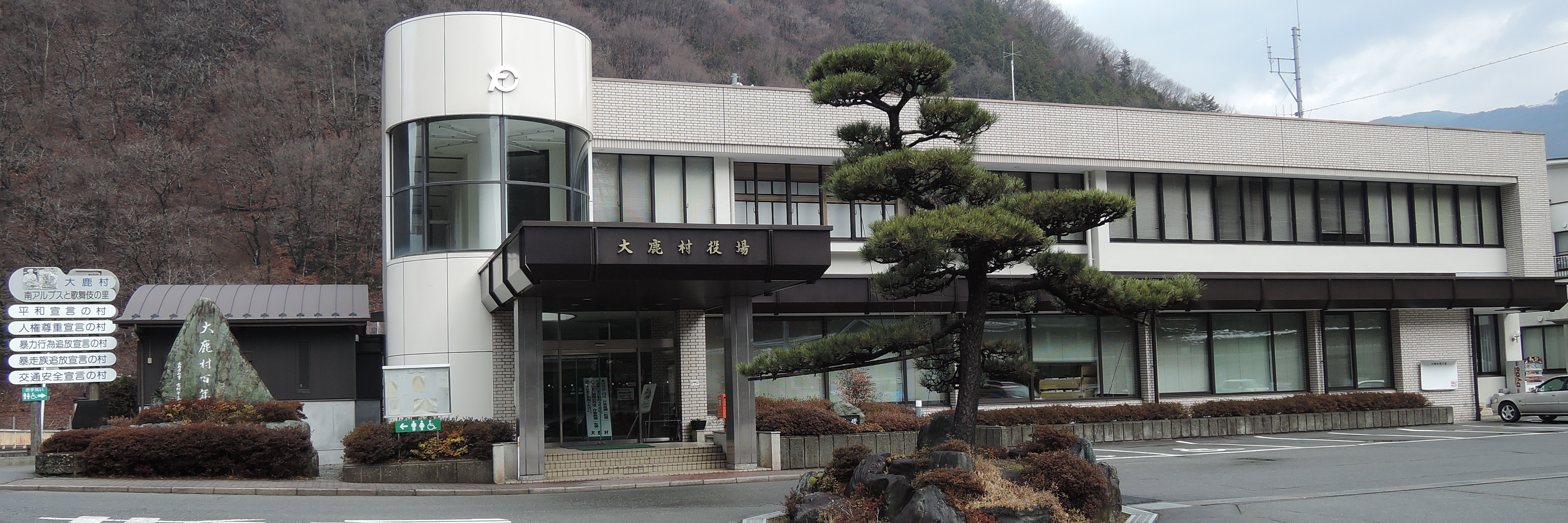
- Ōshika Village Hall

- Flag Seal

- Location of Ōshika in Nagano Prefecture

- Coordinates: 35°34′41.5″N 138°2′2.4″E
- Country: Japan
- Region: Chūbu (Kōshin'etsu)
- Prefecture: Nagano
- District: Shimoina

Area
  - Total: 248.28 km^{2} (95.86 sq mi)

Population (October 2018)
  - Total: 977
  - Density: 3.94/km^{2} (10.2/sq mi)
- Time zone: UTC+9 (Japan Standard Time)
- Symbols
  - Tree: Betula platyphylla
  - Flower: Fritillaria camschatcensis
- Phone number: 0265-39-2001
- Address: 354 Okawara, Ōshika-mura, Shimoina-gun, Nagano-ken 399-3502
- Website: Official website

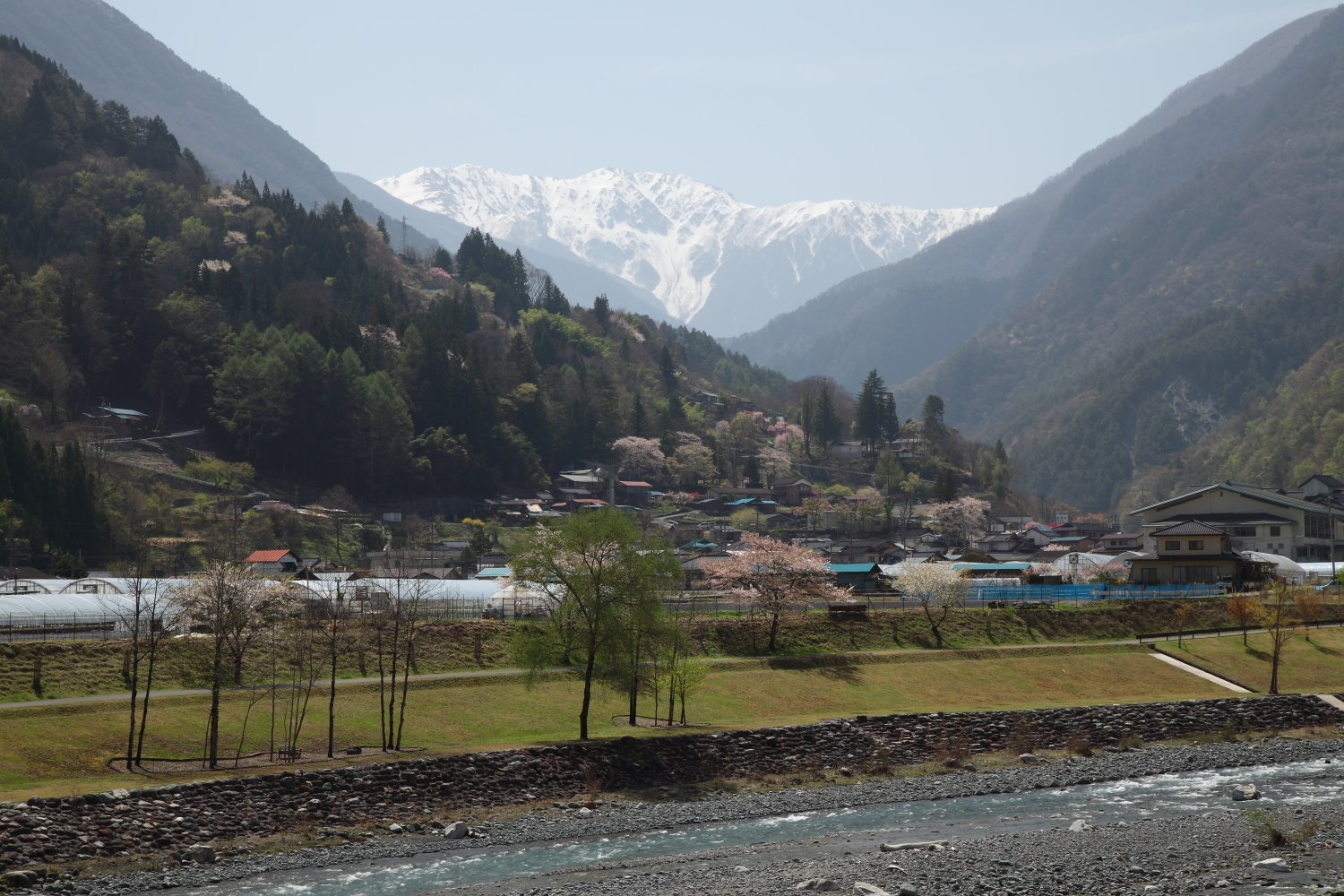
Panorama of Ōshika Village

Ōshika (大鹿村, Ōshika-mura) is a village located in Nagano Prefecture, Japan. As of 1 October 2018, the village had an estimated population of 977, and a population density of 3.9 persons per km^{2}. The total area of the village is 248.28 square kilometres (95.86 sq mi). Ōshika is listed as one of the Most Beautiful Villages in Japan.

== Geography ==
Ōshika is located mountainous southern of Nagano Prefecture, between the Ina Mountains and the Akaishi Mountains, with the Japan Median Tectonic Line passing through the southern portion of the village.

=== Surrounding municipalities ===
- Nagano Prefecture
  - Iida
  - Iijima
  - Ina
  - Komagane
  - Matsukawa
  - Nakagawa
  - Toyooka
- Shizuoka Prefecture
  - Aoi-ku
  - Shizuoka

=== Climate ===
The village has a climate characterized by hot and humid summers, and cold winters (Köppen climate classification Cfa). The average annual temperature in Ōshika is 10.5 °C. The average annual rainfall is 1655 mm with September as the wettest month. The temperatures are highest on average in August, at around 22.8 °C, and lowest in January, at around -1.5 °C.

== Demographics ==
Per Japanese census data, the population of Ōshika has declined by more than 80 percent from its peak around 1950.

Historical population
Year	Pop.	±%
1940	4,948	—
1950	5,210	+5.3%
1960	4,694	−9.9%
1970	3,030	−35.4%
1980	2,322	−23.4%
1990	1,802	−22.4%
2000	1,522	−15.5%
2010	1,160	−23.8%
2020	1,023	−11.8%

== History ==
The area of present-day Ōshika was part of ancient Shinano Province. During the Edo period, the area was part of the tenryō territories administered directly by the Tokugawa shogunate. The present village of Ōshika was established on April 1, 1889 with the establishment of the modern municipalities system.

== Education ==
Ōshika has one public elementary school and one public middle school operated by the village government. The village does not have a high school.

== Transportation ==
=== Railway ===
- The village does not have any passenger railway service

=== Highway ===
- National Route 152
