= Ina-Hongō Station =

Railway station in Iijima, Nagano Prefecture, Japan

Ina-Hongō Station 大田切駅
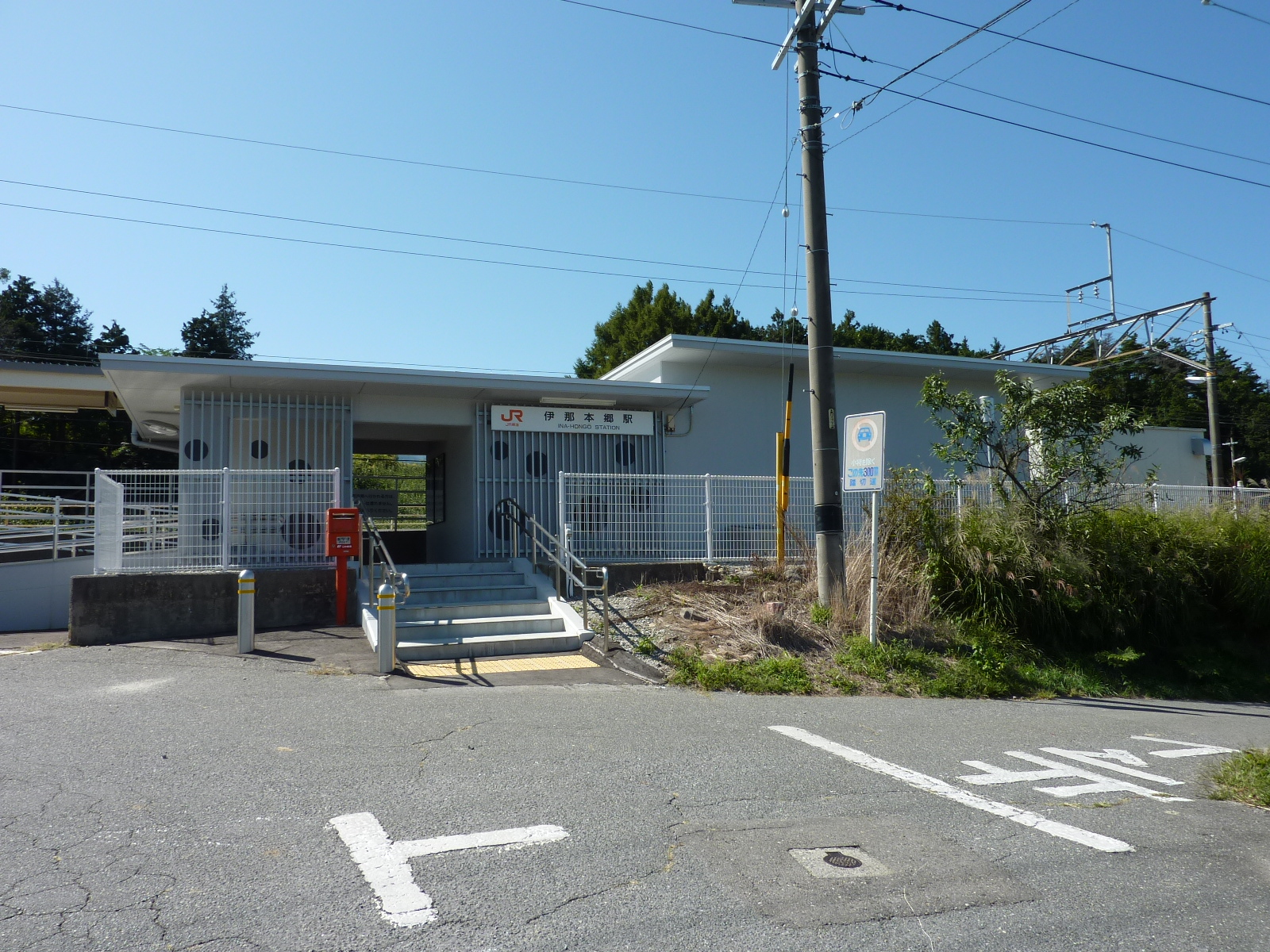
- Ina-Hongō Station in September 2009

General information
- Location: 1886 Hongō, Iijima-machi, Kamiina-gun, Nagano-ken 399-3704; Japan
- Coordinates: 35.6658°N 137.9328°E}
- Elevation: 645 m (2,116 ft)
- Operator: JR Central
- Line: Iida Line
- Distance: 155.1 km from Toyohashi
- Platforms: 2 side platforms

Other information
- Status: Unstaffed

History
- Opened: 23 July 1918

Passengers
- FY2016: 43 (daily)
Location
- Location within Nagano Prefecture Location within Japan

Ina-Hongō Station (伊那本郷駅, Ina-Hongō-eki) is a railway station on the Iida Line in the town of Iijma, Kamiina District Nagano Prefecture, Japan, operated by Central Japan Railway Company (JR Central).

== Lines ==
Ina-Hongō Station is served by the Iida Line and is 155.1 kilometers from the starting point of the line at Toyohashi Station.

== Station layout ==
The station consists of two ground-level opposed side platforms connected by a level crossing. The station is unattended.

=== Platforms ===
1	■ Iida Line	for Iida and Tenryūkyō
2	■ Iida Line	for Tatsuno

== Adjacent stations ==
«	Service	»
Iida Line
Rapid Misuzu: Does not stop at this station
Nanakubo	Local	Iijima

== History ==
Ina-Hongō Station opened on 23 July 1918. With the privatization of Japanese National Railways (JNR) on 1 April 1987, the station came under the control of JR Central. The present station building was completed in 2009.

== Passenger statistics ==
In fiscal 2016, the station was used by an average of 43 passengers daily (boarding passengers only).

== Surrounding area ==
The station is located in a rural area surrounded by orchards.

== See also ==
- List of railway stations in Japan
