= Ina-Tajima Station =

Railway station in Nakagawa, Nagano Prefecture, Japan

Ina-Tajima Station 伊那田島駅
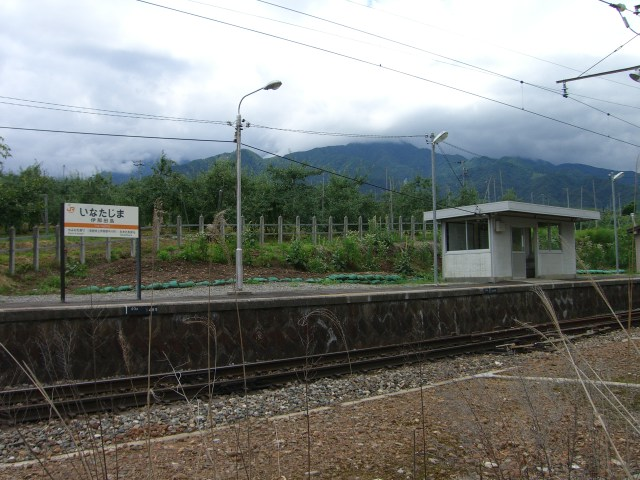
- Ina-Tajima Station in November 2005

General information
- Location: 2190 Katagiri, Nakagawa-mura, Kamiina-gun, Nagano-ken 399-3802; Japan
- Coordinates: 35.6281°N 137.9101°E
- Elevation: 635 m (2,083 ft)
- Operator: JR Central
- Line: Iida Line
- Distance: 148.2 km from Toyohashi
- Platforms: 1 side platform

Other information
- Status: Unstaffed

History
- Opened: 22 November 1920

Passengers
- FY2016: 6 (daily)
Location
- Location within Nagano Prefecture Location within Japan

Ina-Tajima Station (伊那田島駅, Ina-Tajima-eki) is a railway station on the Iida Line in the village of Nakagawa, Kamiina District, Japan, operated by Central Japan Railway Company (JR Central).

== Lines ==
Ina-Tajima Station is served by the Iida Line and is 148.2 kilometers from the starting point of the line at Toyohashi Station.

== Station layout ==
The station consists of one ground-level side platform serving a single bi-directional track. There is no station building, but only a shelter built on top of the platform. The station is unattended.

== Adjacent stations ==
«	Service	»
Iida Line
Rapid Misuzu: Does not stop at this station
Kamikatagiri	Local	Takatōbara

== History ==
Ina-Tajima Station opened on 22 November 1920. With the privatization of Japanese National Railways (JNR) on 1 April 1987, the station came under the control of JR Central.

== Passenger statistics ==
In fiscal 2016, the station was used by an average of 6 passengers daily (boarding passengers only).

== Surrounding area ==
Although it is the only train station in Nakamura, Ina-Tajima is located in a rural area surrounded by orchards.

== See also ==
- List of railway stations in Japan
