= Takatōbara Station =

Railway station in Iijima, Nagano Prefecture, Japan

Takatōbara Station 高遠原駅
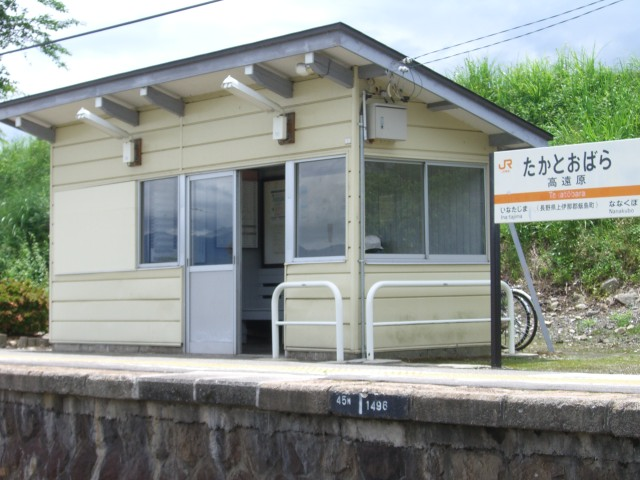
- Takatōbara Station in June 2008

General information
- Location: 4967 Nanakubo, Iijima-machi, Kamiina-gun Nagano-ken 399-3705; Japan
- Coordinates: 35.6446°N 137.9012°E
- Elevation: 665 m (2,182 ft)
- Operator: JR Central
- Line: Iida Line
- Distance: 150.7 km from Toyohashi
- Platforms: 1 side platform

Other information
- Status: Unstaffed

History
- Opened: 12 December 1918

Passengers
- FY2016: 30 (daily)
Location
- Location within Nagano Prefecture Location within Japan

Takatōbara Station (高遠原駅, Takatōbara-eki) is a railway station on the Iida Line in the town of Iijima, Kamiina District, Nagano Prefecture, Japan, operated by Central Japan Railway Company (JR Central).

== Lines ==
Takatōbara Station is served by the Iida Line and is 150.7 kilometers from the starting point of the line at Toyohashi Station.

== Station layout ==
The station consists of one ground-level side platform serving a single bi-directional track. There is no station building, but only a shelter on the platform. The station is unattended.

== Adjacent stations ==
«	Service	»
Iida Line
Rapid Misuzu: Does not stop at this station
Ina-Tajima	Local	Nanakubo

== History ==
Takatōbara Station opened on 12 December 1918. With the privatization of Japanese National Railways (JNR) on 1 April 1987, the station came under the control of JR Central.

== Passenger statistics ==
In fiscal 2016, the station was used by an average of 30 passengers daily (boarding passengers only).

== Surrounding area ==
The station is located in a rural area surrounded by fields.

== See also ==
- List of railway stations in Japan
