= Nakagawa, Nagano =

Nakagawa 中川村
- Village
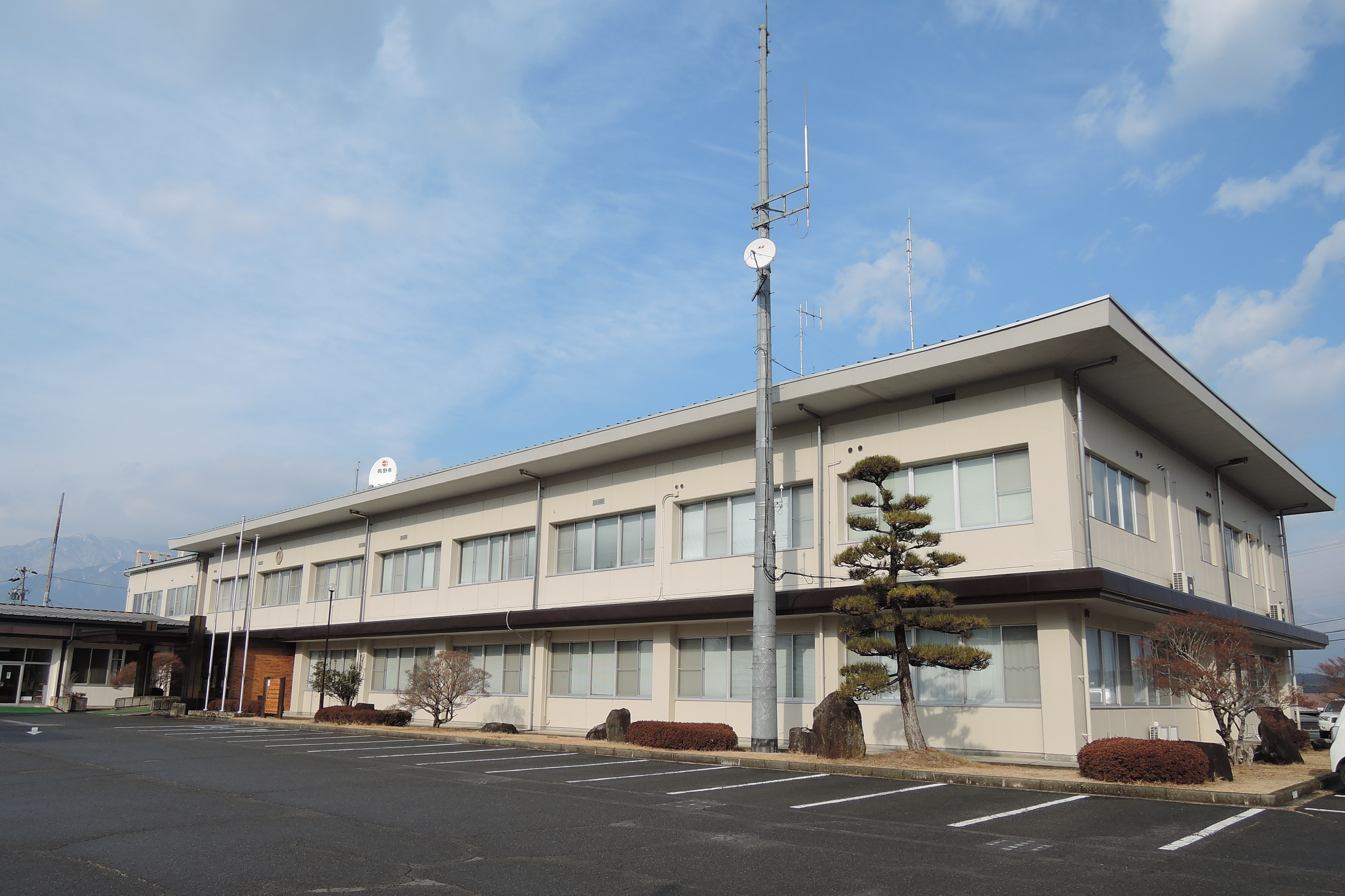
- Nakagawa Village Hall

- Flag Seal

- Location of Nakagawa in Nagano Prefecture

- Coordinates: 35°38′4.3″N 137°56′45.5″E
- Country: Japan
- Region: Chūbu (Kōshin'etsu)
- Prefecture: Nagano
- District: Kamiina

Area
  - Total: 77.05 km^{2} (29.75 sq mi)

Population (April 2019)
  - Total: 4,910
  - Density: 63.7/km^{2} (165/sq mi)
- Time zone: UTC+9 (Japan Standard Time)
- Symbols
  - Tree: Chamaecyparis obtusa
  - Flower: Ponerorchis
- Phone number: 0265-88-3001
- Address: 4045-1 Okusa, Nakagawa-mura, Kamiina-gun, Nagano-ken 399-3892
- Website: Official website

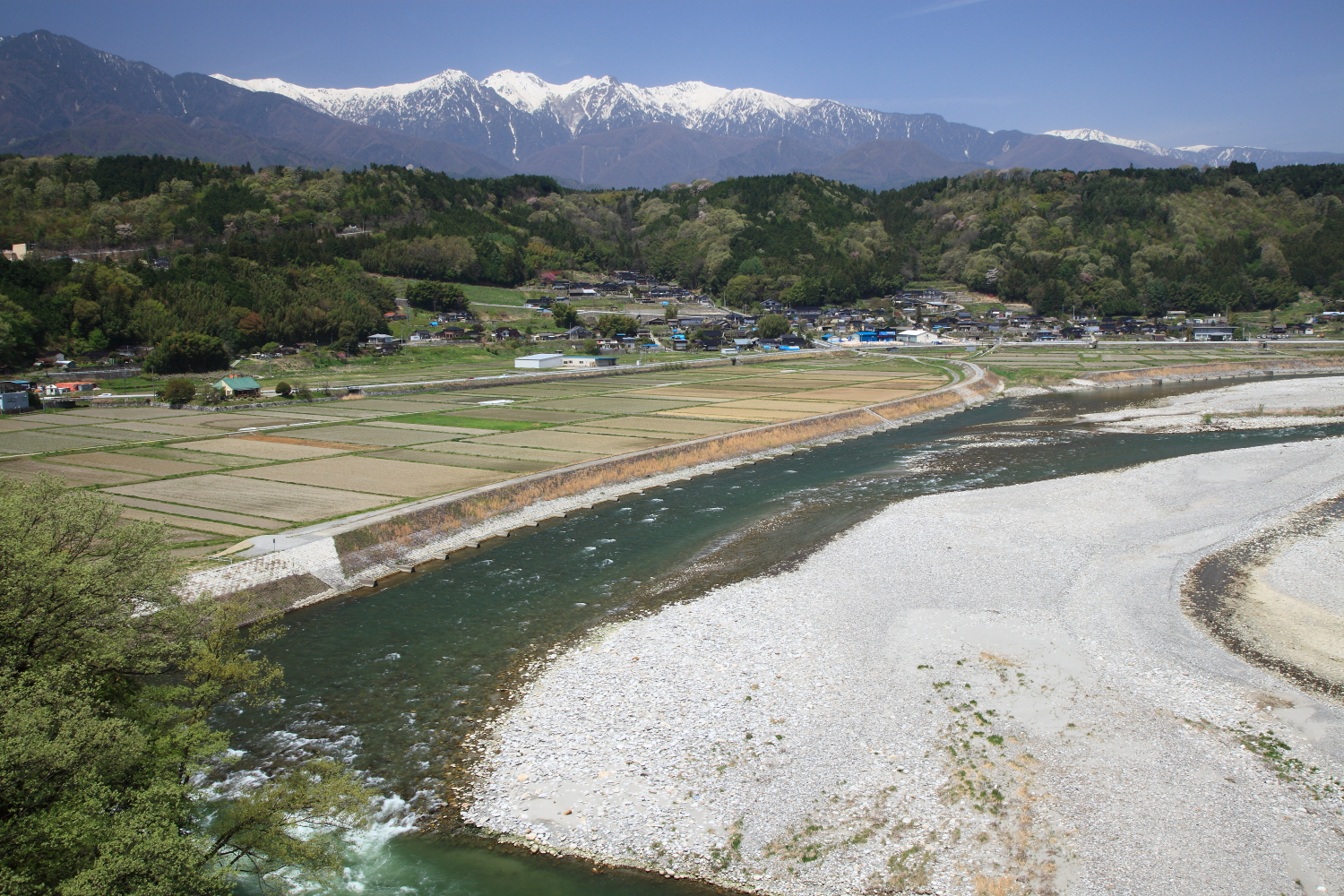
Nakagawa village from Makigahara Bridge

Nakagawa (中川村, Nakagawa-mura) is a village located in Nagano Prefecture, Japan. As of 1 April 2019, the village had an estimated population of 4,910 in 1628 households, and a population density of 64 persons per km^{2}. The total area of the village is 77.05 square kilometres (29.75 sq mi). Nakagawa is listed as one of The Most Beautiful Villages in Japan.

== Geography ==
Nakagawa is located in the Ina Valley of south-central Nagano Prefecture in the Kiso Mountains. The Tenryū River flows through the village. The Koshibu Dam is located in Nakagawa.

=== Surrounding municipalities ===
- Nagano Prefecture
  - Iijima
  - Komagane
  - Matsukawa
  - Ōshika

=== Climate ===
The village has a climate characterized by characterized by hot and humid summers, and cold winters (Köppen climate classification Cfa). The average annual temperature in Nakagawa is 9.7 °C. The average annual rainfall is 1691 mm with September as the wettest month. The temperatures are highest on average in August, at around 22.25 °C, and lowest in January, at around -2.4 °C.

== Demographics ==
Per Japanese census data, the population of Nakagawa has been declining over the past 70 years.

Historical population
| Year | Pop. | ±% |
|---|---|---|
| 1940 | 8,384 | — |
| 1950 | 9,327 | +11.2% |
| 1960 | 7,751 | −16.9% |
| 1970 | 5,816 | −25.0% |
| 1980 | 5,524 | −5.0% |
| 1990 | 5,518 | −0.1% |
| 2000 | 5,475 | −0.8% |
| 2010 | 5,074 | −7.3% |
| 2020 | 4,651 | −8.3% |

== History ==
The area of present-day Nakagawa was part of ancient Shinano Province. The villages of Katagiri and Minakata merged on August 1, 1959 to form the village of Nakagawa.

== Education ==
The village has two public elementary schools and one public junior high school operated by the village government. The village does not have a high school.

== Transportation ==
=== Railway ===
- Central Japan Railway Company - Iida Line
  - Ina-Tajima

=== Highway ===
- National Route 153

== Notable people from Nakagawa ==
- Kōichi Shiozawa, Admiral in the Imperial Japanese Navy
