= Salt road =

Historical route for salt trade

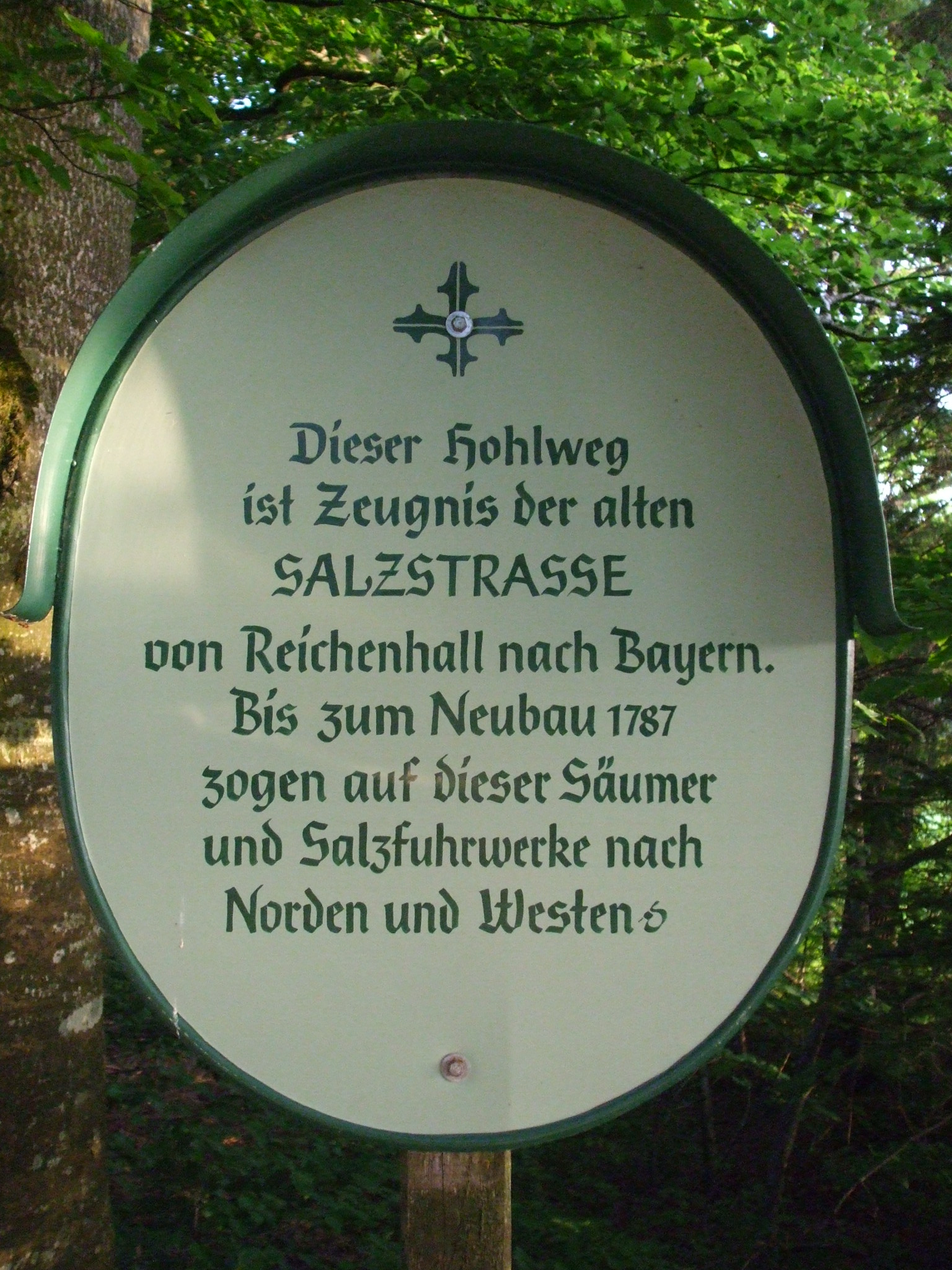
Sign for historic salt road in Bavaria

A salt road (also known as a salt route, salt way, saltway, or salt trading route) refers to any of the prehistoric and historical trade routes by which essential salt was transported to regions that lacked it.

From the Bronze Age (in the 2nd millennium BC) fixed transhumance routes appeared, like the Ligurian drailles that linked the maritime Liguria with the alpages, long before any purposely-constructed roadways formed the overland routes by which salt-rich provinces supplied salt-starved ones.

== Roads ==
The Via Salaria, an ancient Roman road in Italy, eventually ran from Rome (from Porta Salaria in the Aurelian Walls) to Castrum Truentinum (Porto d'Ascoli) on the Adriatic coast - a distance of 242 kilometres (150 mi). A modern road by this name, part of the SS4 highway, runs 51 kilometres (32 mi) from Rome to Osteria Nuova in Orvieto.

The Old Salt Route, about 100 kilometres (62 mi), was a medieval route in northern Germany, linking Lüneburg (in Lower Saxony) with the port of Lübeck (in Schleswig-Holstein), which required more salt than it could produce itself. Lüneburg, first mentioned in the 10th century, grew rich on the salterns surrounding the town. Traders shipped salt via Lauenburg to Lübeck, which supplied all the coasts of the Baltic Sea. Lüneburg and its salt were major factors of power and wealth of the Hanseatic League. After a long period of prosperity, its importance declined after 1600. The last of the salt mines was closed in 1980, ending the thousand-year tradition.

In medieval Bosnia, via Narenta was used as a trade route between Podvisoki and Dubrovnik. It is recorded that 600 horses delivered around 1500 modius of salt to Podvisoki.

In France, the salt route was longer than a portage between navigable streams. Salt unloaded at the ports of Nice and Ventimiglia could travel by two salt roads leading away from the coastal area, from Nice up the Vésubie valley, via Saint-Martin-Vésubie at the head of the valley, or from Ventimiglia inland through the Roya Valley, over the Col de Tende pass and into Piedmont.

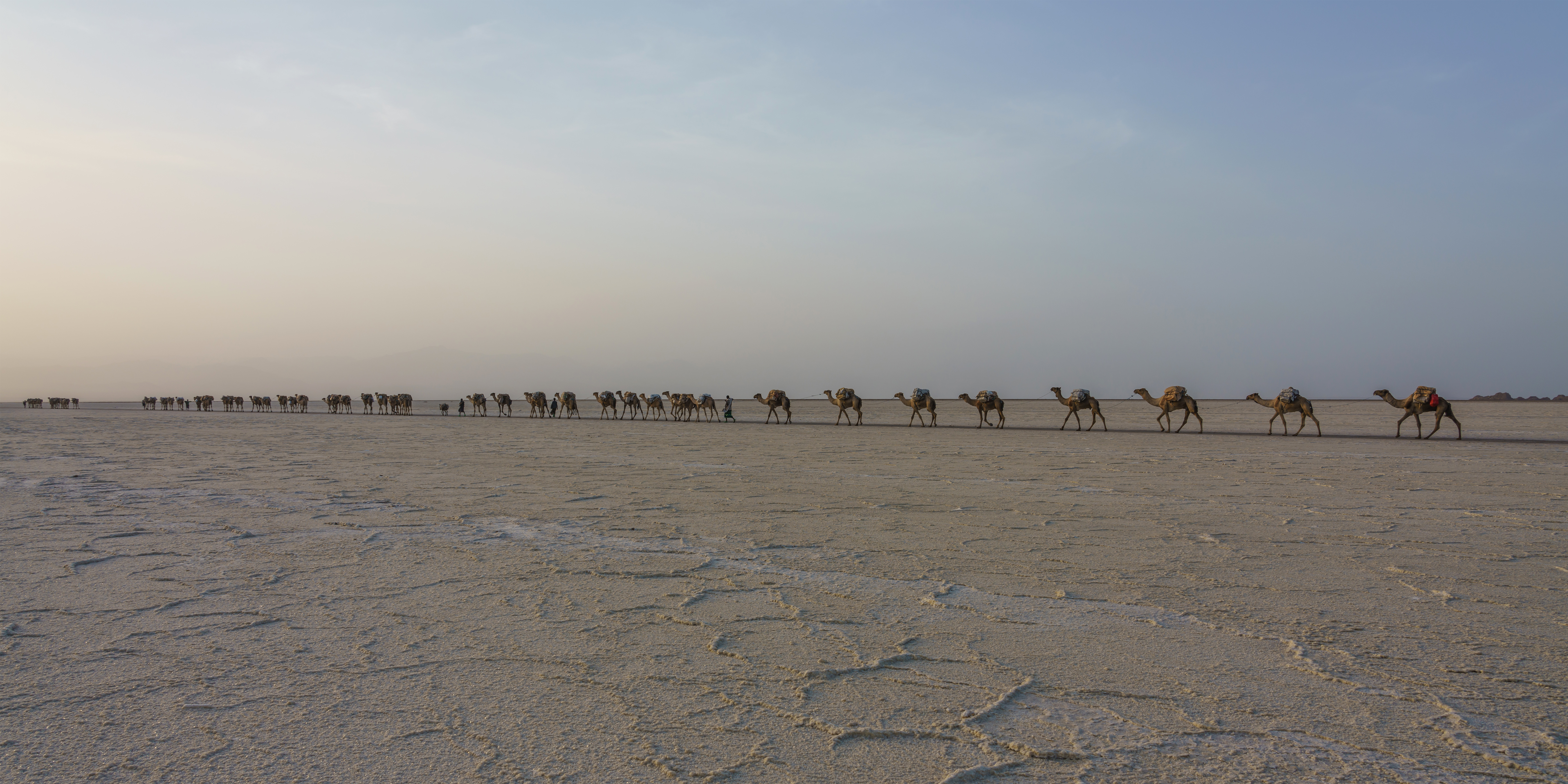
A camel train for salt transportation in Afar Region of Ethiopia

In Ethiopia blocks of salt, called amoleh, were carved from the salt pans of the Afar Depression, especially around Lake Afrera, then carried by camel west to Atsbi and Ficho in the Ethiopian Highlands, whence traders distributed them throughout the rest of Ethiopia, as far south as the Kingdom of Kaffa.

Before the People's Republic of China annexed Tibet and closed the borders in the 1950s, salt trade between Nepal and Tibet crossed passes through the Himalayas such as the gorges of the upper Karnali and Gandaki rivers. Caravans of pack animals brought rice up from Nepal's Terai and lower hills in exchange for salt from dry lakes on the Tibetan Plateau.

In the United Kingdom an ancient road known as the Salt Way runs from Droitwich Spa, passing Banbury and onto Princes Risborough. The Salt Way is managed by the Salt Way Activity Group.

The Vienna Road, later also known as Southern Railway (Austria) that succeeded the road as a railway connection between Vienna and Trieste, was a salt road connecting the two cities via Graz, Maribor and Ljubljana. While salt was not the primary good traded on this road (roughly 7% of the trade), the historic salt connection is a significant part of Slovenian culture and tradition due to a folk hero Martin Krpan - a story based on oral tradition taking place on the Vienna Road.

In medieval Japan, the landlocked and mountainous Shinano Province was supplied with salt by two routes collectively called Shio no Michi.

== Rivers and ports ==
The salt highways of Europe were the navigable rivers, where by medieval times shipments of salt coming upstream passed rafts and log-trains of timber, which could only be shipped downstream. And even along Europe's coasts, once long-distance trade was revived in the 11th century, the hot and sunny south naturally outproduced the wet north. By the Late Middle Ages, the expanding fishing fleets of the Low Countries required more salt than could be produced locally; the balance was made up with salt from the Iberian Peninsula. "The United Provinces could have been brought to their knees if their supplies of salt had been blocked at the end of the sixteenth century. Spain did no more than dream of this," Fernand Braudel has written. In Ming China, salt as well as rice was shipped from south to north, along the Imperial Canal as far as Beijing.

== Salterns and saltpans ==
In France, a major source of marine salt with access to expansive hinterlands in need of it was the wetlands region in Languedoc called the Camargue; from the salt pans called salines, convoys of boatloads of salt could be carried up the Rhone to Seyssel where it had to be off-loaded and carried by mule train inland to the little village of Regonfle near Geneva, where it rejoined a waterway.

Of the early modern period in Europe, Fernand Braudel remarked that in spite of the flux and reflux of economics:

"no salt mine was ever abandoned and the scale of the equipment needed put these mines in the hands of merchants from very early days. Salt-marshes on the other hand, were exploited by artisanal methods: the merchants took control only of transport and marketing, both in Setúbal in Portugal and in Peccais in Languedoc. Salt marketing was probably quite big business along the Atlantic seabord or the Rhône valley."

The vast interior of Poland was salt-starved, its maritime districts lying under rainy skies and fronting the Baltic Sea. By medieval times the process of mining for fossil salt supplemented the age-old techniques of evaporating sea salt in tidal pans. By the 14th century, at Wieliczka near Kraków, Braudel reports that peasant extraction of salt from brine evaporated in large shallow iron pans had been eliminated by the early industrialisation of salt mining. "Galleries and shafts were now dug to a depth of 300 metres, and enormous winches powered by teams of horses brought blocks of salt to the surface. At its peak, production stood at 40,000 tons a year and the mines employed 3,000 workers. By 1368, the cooperation of the Polish state had been obtained."

Since pre-Inca times, salt has been obtained in Maras, Peru, by evaporating salty water from a local subterranean stream.

== See also ==
- History of salt
- Shio no Michi - In Japan case.
- Timeline of international trade
