= Nanakubo Station =

Railway station in Iijima, Nagano Prefecture, Japan

Nanakubo Station 七久保駅
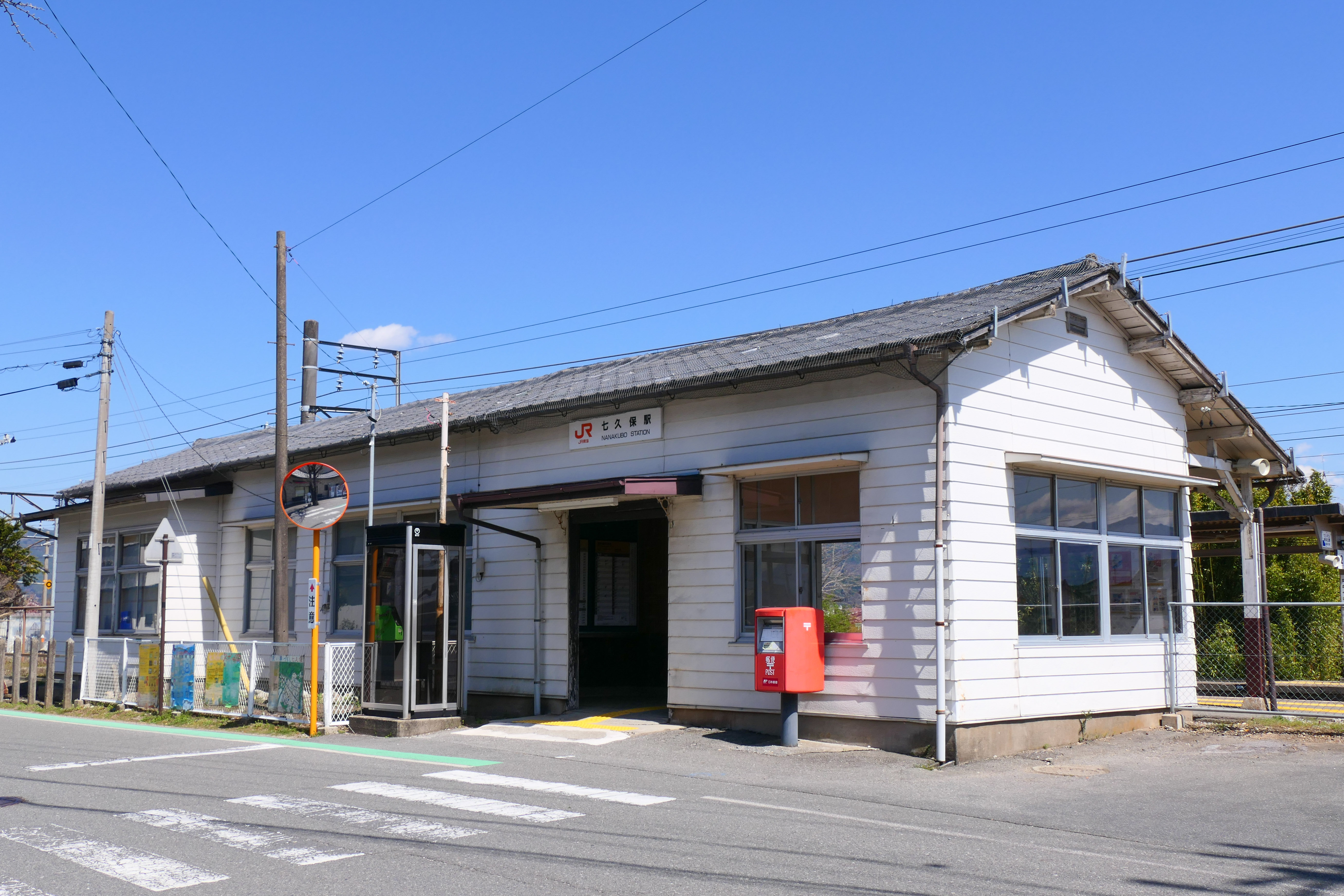
- Nanakubo Station in April 2021

General information
- Location: 851 Nanakubo, Iijima-machi, Kamiina-gun Nagano-ken 399-3705; Japan
- Coordinates: 35.6547°N 137.9111°E
- Elevation: 695 m (2,280 ft)
- Operator: JR Central
- Line: Iida Line
- Distance: 152.3 km from Toyohashi
- Platforms: 1 side + 1 island platform

Other information
- Status: Unstaffed

History
- Opened: 23 July 1918

Passengers
- FY2016: 159 (daily)
Location
- Location within Nagano Prefecture Location within Japan

Nanakubo Station (七久保駅, Nanakubo-eki) is a railway station on the Iida Line in the town of Iijima, Kamiina District, Nagano Prefecture, Japan, operated by Central Japan Railway Company (JR Central).

== Lines ==
Nanakubo Station is served by the Iida Line and is 152.3 kilometers from the starting point of the line at Toyohashi Station.

== Station layout ==
The station consists of one ground-level side platform and one ground-level island platform connected by a level crossing. The station is unattended.

=== Platforms ===
1	■ Iida Line	for Tatsuno
2	■ Iida Line	for Iida and Tenryūkyō
3	■ Iida Line	

== Adjacent stations ==
«	Service	»
Iida Line
Kamikatagiri	Rapid Misuzu	Iijima
Takatōbara	Local	Ina-Hongō

== History ==
Nanakubo Station opened on 23 July 1918. With the privatization of Japanese National Railways (JNR) on 1 April 1987, the station came under the control of JR Central.

== Passenger statistics ==
In fiscal 2016, the station was used by an average of 159 passengers daily (boarding passengers only).

== Surrounding area ==
- Nanakubo Post Office

== See also ==
- List of railway stations in Japan
