= Via de Zenta =

Medieval road connecting the Adriatic with Niš

Via de Zenta (Serbo-Croatian: Zetski put / Зетски пут) was a medieval road connecting the Adriatic coast with the city of Naissus (modern Niš). It started from the mouth of the Buna river, the Shkodër port, (alternatively Bar then Cetinje) along the Drin Valley to Prizren, Pristina then to Lipjan, then through Novo Brdo to Vranje and Niš. The Republic of Venice and Ragusa used the road for trade with Serbia and Bulgaria. From Niš, the ancient Roman road of Via Militaris continued all the way to Constantinople. The road ended its use with the Ottoman conquest of this part of Serbia by 1392, after the earlier Ottoman conquest of the southern provinces of Macedonia (1371), the Ottomans having begun their European conquest at Gallipoli (1354).

The Venetian traders, who were the most frequent users of the road, used it for export of wheat, animals, silver and grape from Serbia and Bulgaria to Italy. It was among the most important communication links of Ragusa and its hinterland. The other road connecting hinterland Serbia with the Adriatic was that from Niš, through the mining province of Kopaonik, to Via Drine. Two other [smaller] roads went through Bosnia to the northeast: one was Via Narenta, traversing the canyons of the Neretva, and the other was Via Argentaria, that connected Split with the silver mines of Ilidža and Srebrenica and in turn Sremska Mitrovica in the north.

It had an important cultural role as in connecting the hinterlands with the Adriatic cities which also had a Latin population, and Venice.

== Sources ==
- Ducellier, Alain (1999), "Albania, Serbia and Bulgaria", in Abulafia, David (ed.), The New Cambridge Medieval History, Volume V: c. 1198-c. 1300, Cambridge University Press, pp. 779–795, ISBN 0-521-36289-X
- Zec, Tatijana (1974). Saobraćaj i transport dobara. pp. 14–15.
- Obolensky, Dimitri (1996). Византијски комонвелт. Vasko Gligorijevic. pp. 13–. ISBN 978-86-07-00988-6.
- Carter, Francis W. (1972). Dubrovnik (Ragusa): A Classic City-state. Seminar Press. pp. 141–142. ISBN 978-0-12-812950-0.
- Гавро A. Шкриванић (1974). Путеви у средњовековној Србији. Туристичка штампа. pp. 62–.
- Josif Konstantin Jireček (1951). Trgovački drumovi i rudnici Srbije i Bosne u srednjem vijeku. Svjetlost.
