= Iijima, Nagano =

Iijima 飯島町
- Town
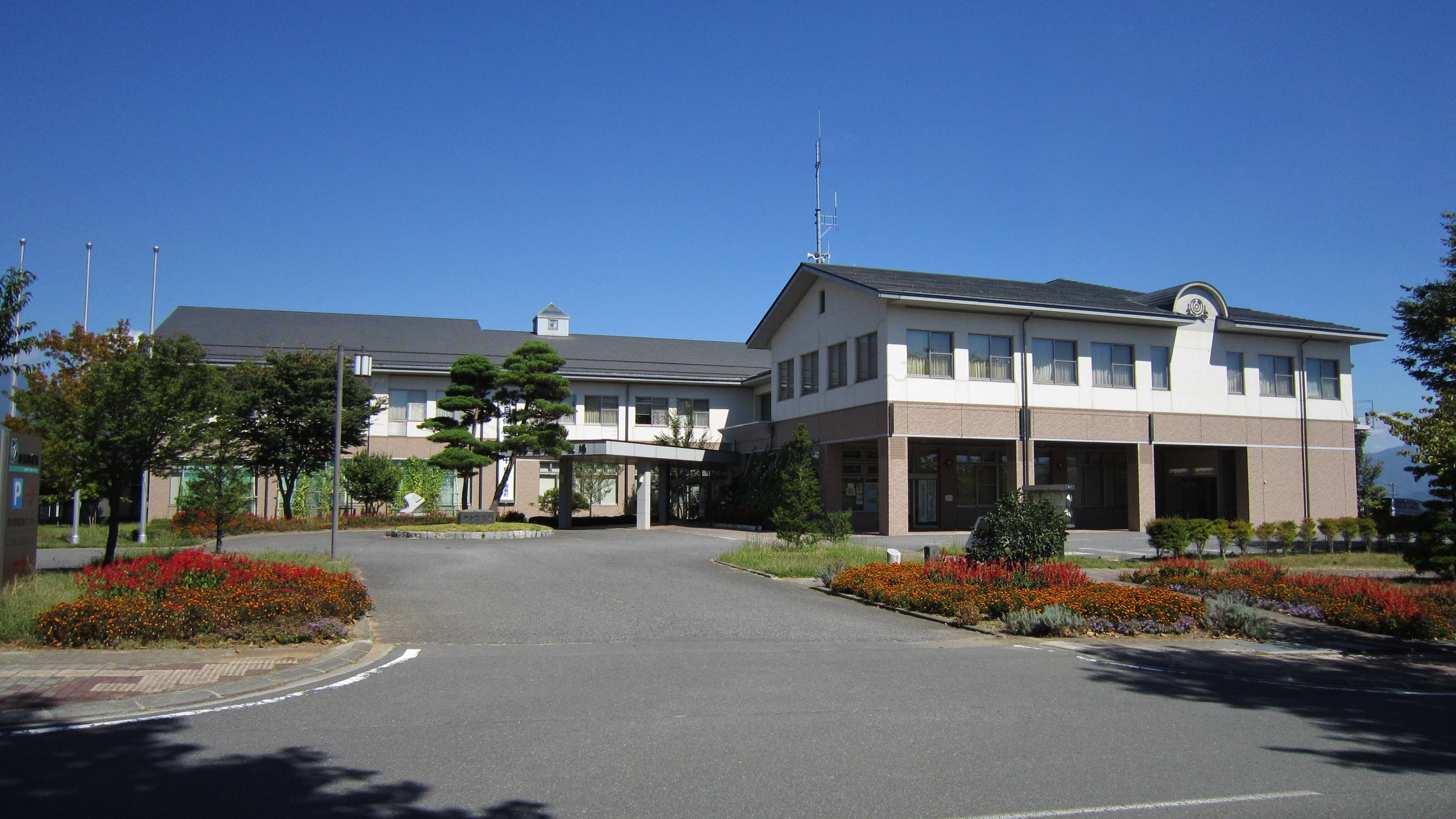
- Iijima Town Hall

- Flag Seal

- Location of Iijima in Nagano Prefecture

- Coordinates: 35°40′36.3″N 137°55′11.2″E
- Country: Japan
- Region: Chūbu (Kōshin'etsu)
- Prefecture: Nagano
- District: Kamiina

Area
  - Total: 86.96 km^{2} (33.58 sq mi)

Population (April 2019)
  - Total: 9,446
  - Density: 108.6/km^{2} (281.3/sq mi)
- Time zone: UTC+9 (Japan Standard Time)
- Phone number: 0265-86-3111
- Address: 2537 Iijima, Iijima-machi, Kamiina-gun, Nagano-ken 389-0692
- Climate: Cfa/Dfa
- Website: Official website
- Symbols
- Flower: Shakunage
- Tree: Japanese yew

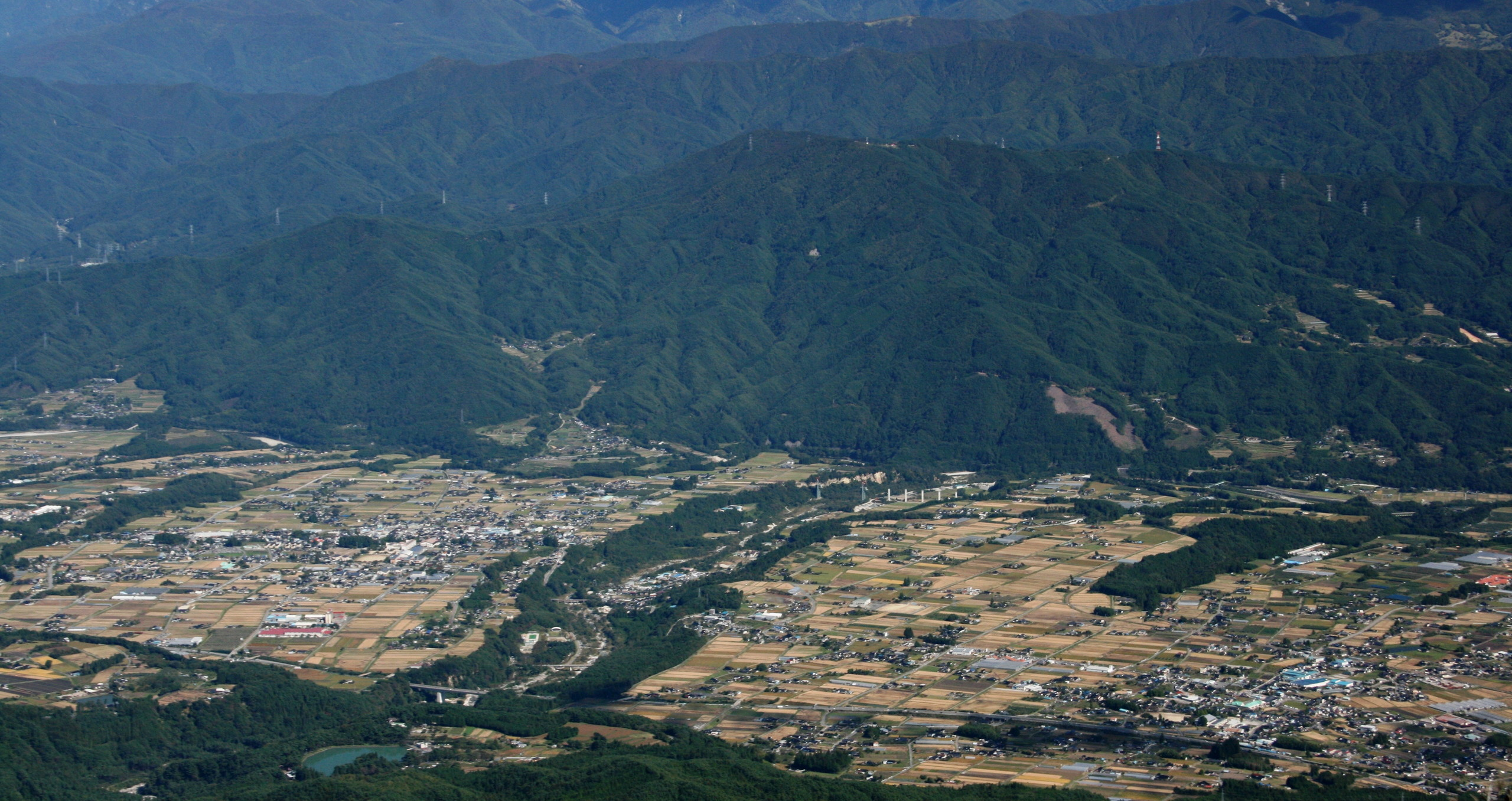
Iijima from Mount Eboshi

Iijima (飯島町, Iijima-machi) is a town located in Nagano Prefecture, Japan. As of 1 April 2019, the town had an estimated population of 9,446 in 3599 households, and a population density of 110 persons per km^{2}. The total area of the town is 86.96 square kilometres (33.58 sq mi).

== Geography ==
Iijima is located in-between the Kiso Mountains and Mount Senjō of the Akaishi Mountains of south-central Nagano Prefecture. The Chikuma River flows through the town.

=== Surrounding municipalities ===
- Nagano Prefecture
  - Iida
  - Komagane
  - Matsukawa
  - Nakagawa
  - Ōkuwa

=== Climate ===
The town has a climate characterized by hot and humid summers, and cold winters (Köppen climate classification Cfa). The average annual temperature in Iijima is 11.2 °C (52.2 °F). The average annual rainfall is 2,014.1 mm (79.30 in) with July as the wettest month. The temperatures are highest on average in August, at around 23.3 °C (73.9 °F), and lowest in January, at around −0.7 °C (30.7 °F).

Climate data for Iijima (1991−2020 normals, extremes 1978−present)
Month	Jan	Feb	Mar	Apr	May	Jun	Jul	Aug	Sep	Oct	Nov	Dec	Year
Record high °C (°F)	14.3 (57.7)	18.9 (66.0)	23.3 (73.9)	28.4 (83.1)	31.9 (89.4)	34.4 (93.9)	37.3 (99.1)	35.5 (95.9)	33.5 (92.3)	28.6 (83.5)	22.4 (72.3)	18.2 (64.8)	37.3 (99.1)
Mean daily maximum °C (°F)	4.5 (40.1)	5.9 (42.6)	10.3 (50.5)	16.5 (61.7)	21.6 (70.9)	24.3 (75.7)	27.9 (82.2)	29.5 (85.1)	25.0 (77.0)	18.9 (66.0)	12.9 (55.2)	7.1 (44.8)	17.0 (62.7)
Daily mean °C (°F)	−0.7 (30.7)	0.2 (32.4)	4.1 (39.4)	9.8 (49.6)	14.9 (58.8)	18.6 (65.5)	22.3 (72.1)	23.3 (73.9)	19.4 (66.9)	13.3 (55.9)	7.0 (44.6)	1.8 (35.2)	11.2 (52.1)
Mean daily minimum °C (°F)	−5.0 (23.0)	−4.5 (23.9)	−1.1 (30.0)	4.0 (39.2)	9.3 (48.7)	14.2 (57.6)	18.4 (65.1)	19.1 (66.4)	15.4 (59.7)	9.1 (48.4)	2.5 (36.5)	−2.4 (27.7)	6.6 (43.8)
Record low °C (°F)	−13.8 (7.2)	−14.1 (6.6)	−10.4 (13.3)	−6.2 (20.8)	0.0 (32.0)	5.5 (41.9)	11.7 (53.1)	11.7 (53.1)	4.3 (39.7)	−1.7 (28.9)	−5.0 (23.0)	−11.5 (11.3)	−14.1 (6.6)
Average precipitation mm (inches)	74.5 (2.93)	103.8 (4.09)	180.5 (7.11)	180.7 (7.11)	200.2 (7.88)	236.6 (9.31)	266.6 (10.50)	155.2 (6.11)	219.8 (8.65)	192.6 (7.58)	123.5 (4.86)	80.2 (3.16)	2,014.1 (79.30)
Average precipitation days (≥ 1.0 mm)	7.1	7.0	10.3	10.2	11.1	13.3	13.6	10.8	11.2	10.1	8.0	7.3	120
Mean monthly sunshine hours	165.3	162.2	177.8	196.1	208.9	152.2	159.9	199.0	155.9	160.4	158.7	158.2	2,054.5
Source: Japan Meteorological Agency

== Economy ==
The local economy is agricultural, dominated by rice and horticulture.

== History ==
The area of present-day Iijima was part of ancient Shinano Province, and developed as a post station in the Sanshū Kaidō highway linking inland regions of Shinano with the Pacific Ocean. The area was tenryō territory controlled directly by the Tokugawa shogunate until the Meiji restoration. The modern village of Iijima established on April 1, 1889, by the establishment of the municipalities system and was elevated to town status on January 1, 1954. The town annexed the neighboring village of Nakakubō on September 30, 1956.

== Demographics ==
Per Japanese census data, the population of Iijima has remained relatively steady from 1960 until 2000 but has decreased slightly in recent years.

Historical population
Year	Pop.	±%
1940	9,752	—
1950	12,070	+23.8%
1960	11,230	−7.0%
1970	10,466	−6.8%
1980	10,515	+0.5%
1990	10,801	+2.7%
2000	10,895	+0.9%
2010	9,902	−9.1%
2020	9,004	−9.1%

== Education ==
Iijima has two public elementary schools and one public middle school operated by the town government. The town does not have a high school.

== Transportation ==
=== Railway ===
- Central Japan Railway Company - Iida Line
  - Takatōbara - Nanakubo - Ina-Hongō - Iijima - Tagiri

=== Highway ===
- Chūō Expressway
- National Route 153

== International relations ==
- - Ferraz de Vasconcelos, city in province of São Paulo, Brazil. Since May 1975.

== Local attractions ==
- Iijima jin'ya
