= Hase, Nagano =

Dissolved municipality in Nagano prefecture, Japan

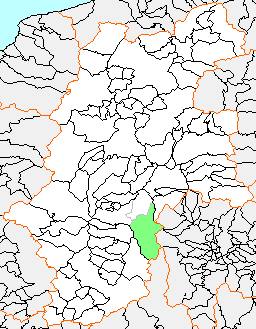
Map of Hase, Nagano

Hase (長谷村, Hase-mura) was a village located in Kamiina District, Nagano Prefecture, Japan.

As of 2003, the village had an estimated population of 2,198 and a density of 6.85 persons per km^{2}. The total area was 320.81 km^{2}.

On March 31, 2006, Hase, along with the town of Takatō (also from Kamiina District), was merged into the expanded city of Ina.
