= Takatō, Nagano =

Dissolved municipality in Nagano prefecture, Japan

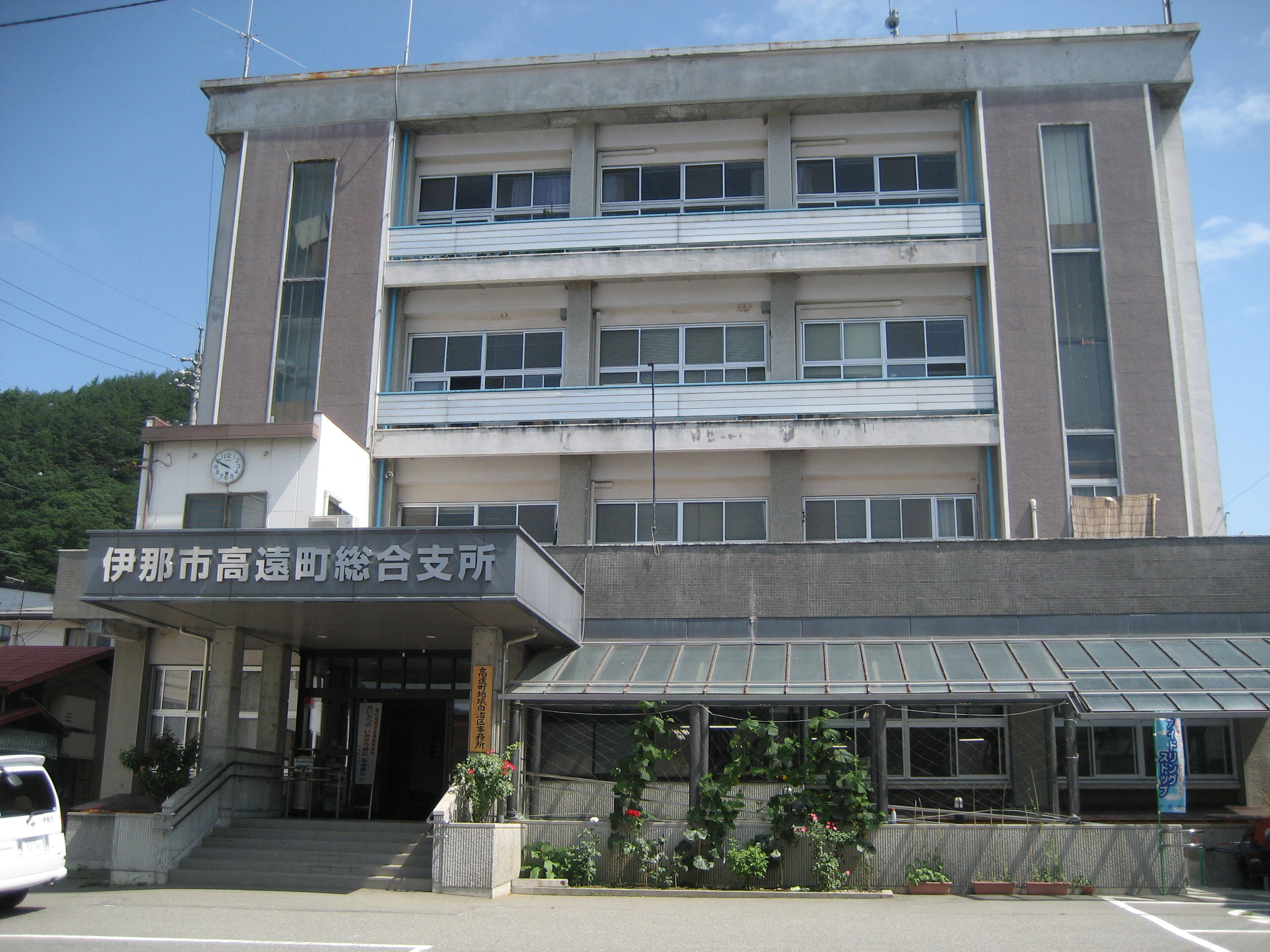
Former Takatō town hall

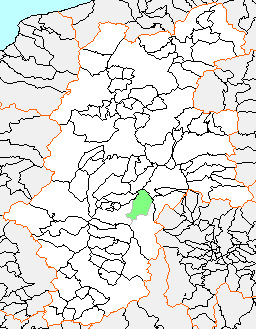
Map of Takatō, Nagano

Takatō (高遠町, Takatō-machi) is a town located in Kamiina District, Nagano Prefecture, Japan.

== Population ==
As of 2003, the town had an estimated population of 6,976. The total area was 139.36 km^{2}.

== History ==
On March 31, 2006, Takatō, along with the village of Hase (also from Kamiina District), was merged into the expanded city of Ina.

== Attractions ==
Takatō is famous in Japan for its cherry blossom (sakura) park. The blossoms usually bloom in the first half of April. In 2016 the town was selected as one of The Most Beautiful Villages in Japan.

In 2025, an annual Jazz and Blues festival was started.
