= Via Drine =

- Dubrovački put
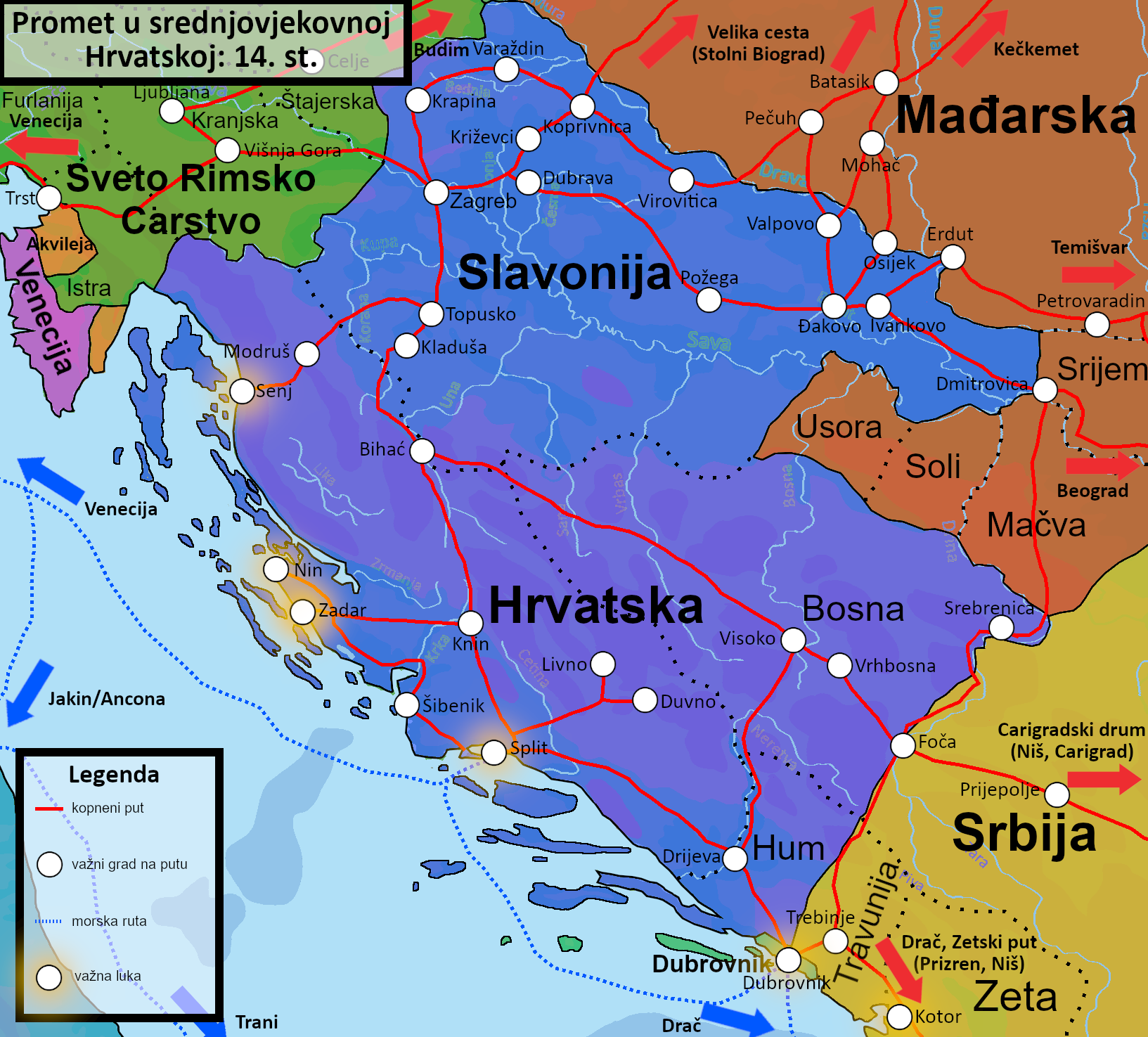
- Via Drine (bottom right) on the map of the roads in Croatian lands in the 14th century
- Interactive map of Via Drine
- 42°38′25″N 18°06′30″E
- Location: Dubrovnik, Foča to Srebrenica

Via Drine, sometimes also Dubrovački put, was a medieval trade route through the Dinaric Alps that connected Dubrovnik (Republic of Ragusa) with the Drina river valley, and from there to various places in medieval Bosnia, Croatia and Serbia as well as the rest of the Balkans.

The route went through Trebinje, Bileća, Gacko, Foča, Goražde, Višegrad, and Srebrenica. From Trebinje, a route forked towards the Via de Zenta. From Foča, a route forked towards the Via Militaris in Niš. From Srebrenica, a route went to Sremska Mitrovica.

It was one of the two main routes from Bosnia to Dubrovnik, and was also known as the Dubrovački put (lit. the path to Dubrovnik); the other was Via Narenta that followed the path of the Neretva.

== Sources ==
- Šebečić, Berislav (December 2002). "Srebreni putevi u Europi početkom novog vijeka i rudarsko-financijski imperiji Fuggerovih" [Silver routes in Europe at the beginning of new age and the Fuggers' mining-financial empires]. The Mining-geological-petroleum Engineering Bulletin (in Croatian). 14 (1). Faculty of mining, geology and petroleum engineering, University of Zagreb.
- "Bileća". Croatian Encyclopedia (in Croatian). Miroslav Krleža Lexicographical Institute. 1999–2009.
- Lorger, Srećko (2011). "Kermes, crvac - i još neka crvena bojila" [The Semantic World of Tints and Dyes: Crvac in Fifteenth-Century Dubrovnik]. Anali Zavoda za Povijesne Znanosti Hrvatske Akademije Znanosti i Umjetnosti u Dubrovniku (in Croatian) (49). Croatian Academy of Sciences and Arts: 56.
