= Ina, Nagano =

City in Nagano Prefecture, Japan

Ina 伊那市
- City
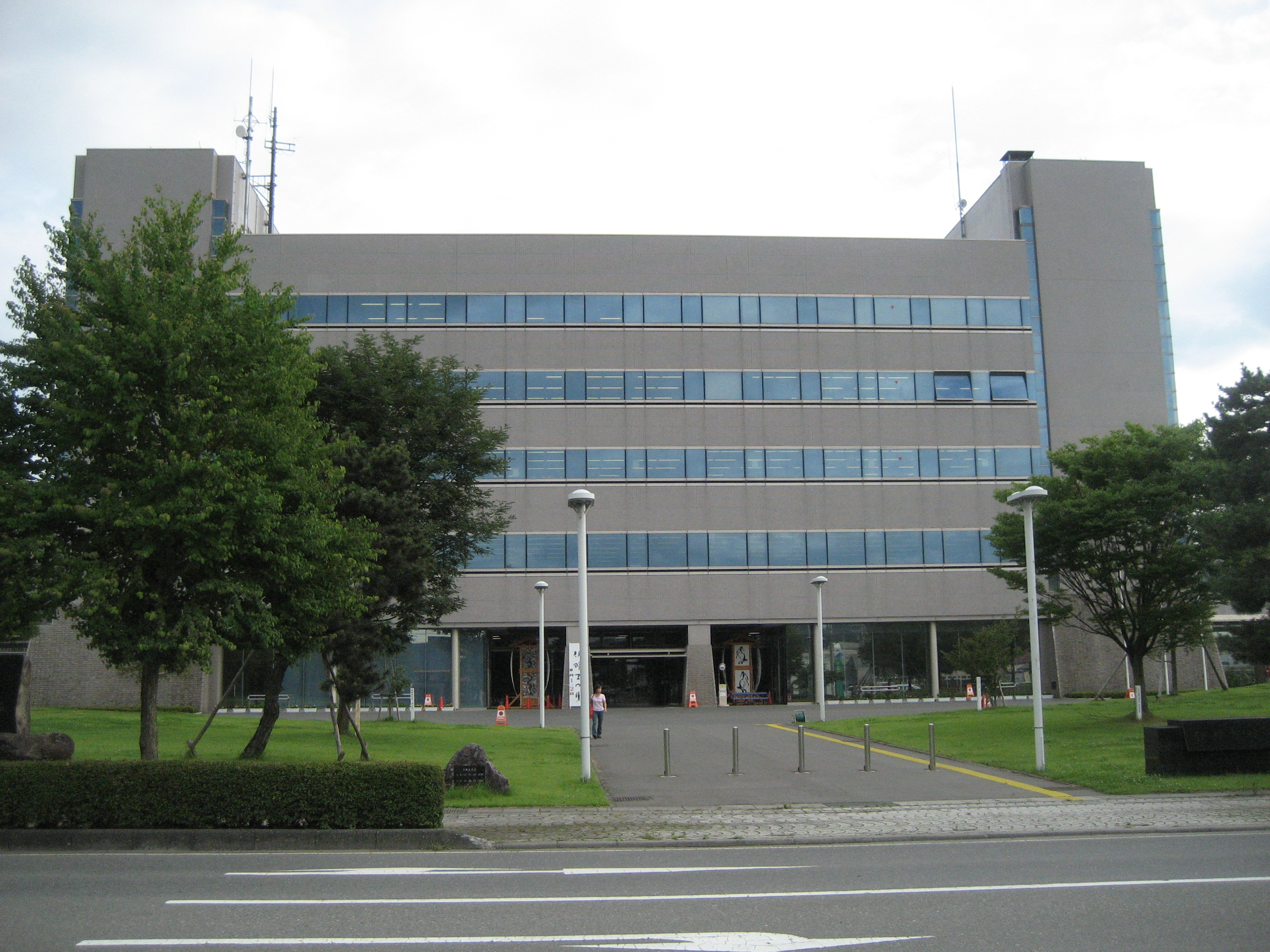
- Ina City Hall

- Flag Seal

- Location of Ina in Nagano

- Coordinates: 35°49′39.1″N 137°57′14.3″E
- Country: Japan
- Region: Chūbu (Kōshin'etsu)
- Prefecture: Nagano

Area
  - Total: 667.93 km^{2} (257.89 sq mi)

Population (March 2019)
  - Total: 68,177
  - Density: 102.07/km^{2} (264.37/sq mi)
- Time zone: UTC+9 (Japan Standard Time)
- Phone number: 0265-78-4111
- Address: 3050 Ina, Ina-shi, Nagano-ken 396-8617
- Climate: Cfa/Dfa
- Website: Official website
- Symbols
- Bird: Rock ptarmigan
- Flower: Sakura
- Tree: Maple

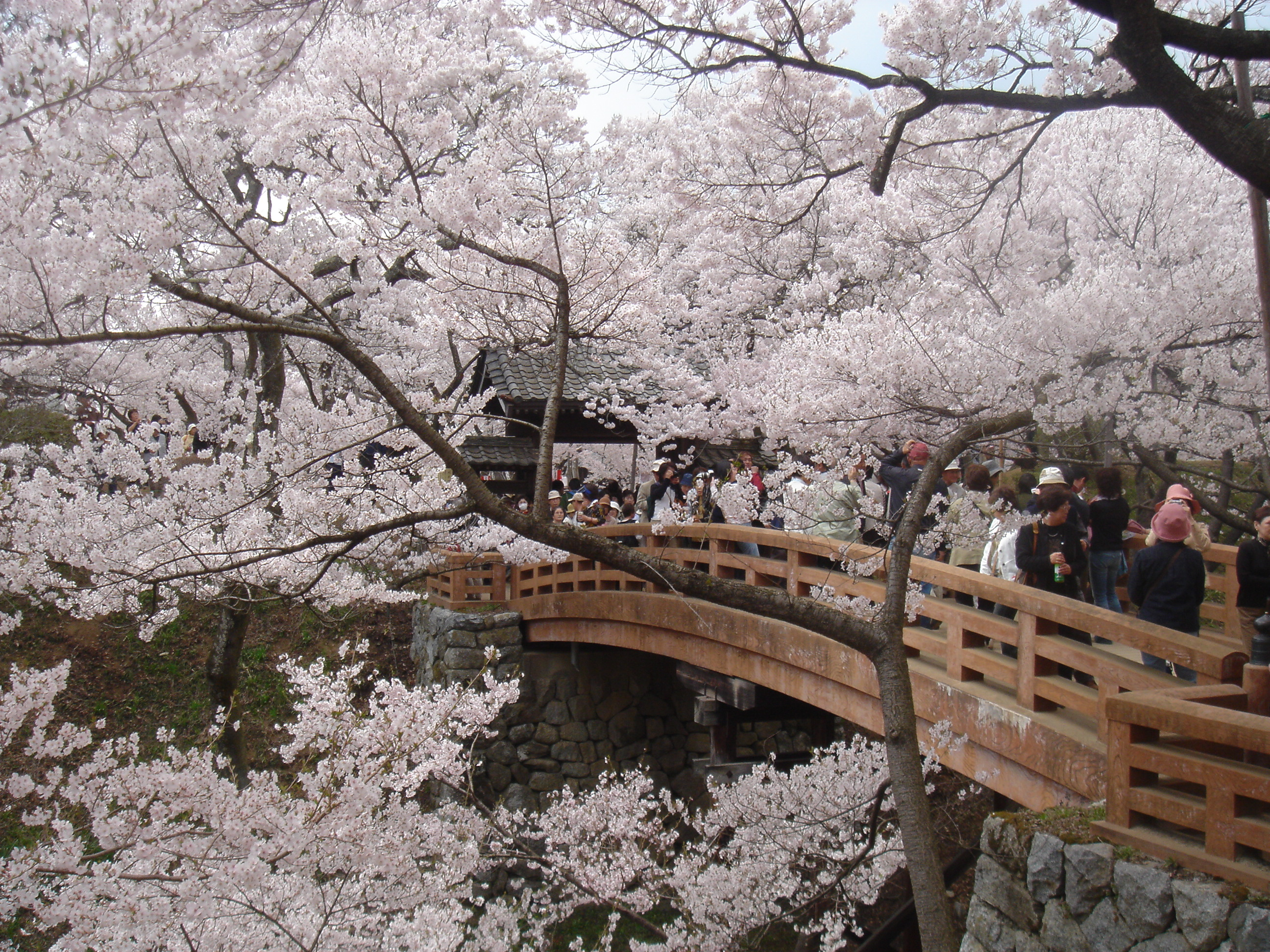
Sakura at Takatō Castle, Ina

Ina (伊那市, Ina-shi) Japanese pronunciation: [í.nä̀, ì.nä́(.ɕì)] is a city located in Nagano Prefecture, Japan. As of 1 March 2019, the city had an estimated population of 68,177 in 27587 households, and a population density of 100 persons per km^{2}. The total area of the city is 667.93 square kilometres (257.89 sq mi). In 2016, the former town of Takatō, now part of Ina, was selected as one of The Most Beautiful Villages in Japan.

== Geography ==
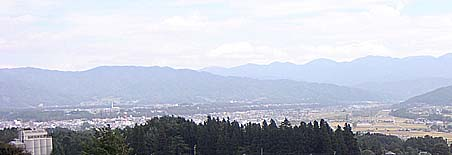
Ina-Shi, Nagano, Japan

Ina is located in south-central Nagano prefecture. It is bordered to the east by the Akaishi Mountains, including Mount Nyukasa (1955 meters), Mount Nokogiri (2685 meters), Mount Senjō (3033 meters), and Mount Shiomi (3047 meters). The Tenryū River runs through the city.

=== Surrounding municipalities ===
- Nagano Prefecture
  - Komagane
  - Shiojiri
  - Suwa
  - Chino
  - Suwa District: Fujimi
  - Kamiina District: Minowa, Minamiminowa, Miyada
  - Shimoina District: Ōshika
  - Kiso District: Kiso (town)
- Yamanashi Prefecture
  - Minami-Alps
  - Hokuto
- Shizuoka Prefecture
  - Aoi-ku, Shizuoka

== Climate ==
The city has a climate characterized by hot and humid summers, and relatively mild winters (Köppen climate classification Cfa). The average annual temperature in Ina is 11.7 °C (53.1 °F). The average annual rainfall is 1,454.0 mm (57.24 in) with July as the wettest month. The temperatures are highest on average in August, at around 24.0 °C (75.2 °F), and lowest in January, at around −0.7 °C (30.7 °F).

Climate data for Ina (1993–2020 normals, extremes 1993–present)
Month	Jan	Feb	Mar	Apr	May	Jun	Jul	Aug	Sep	Oct	Nov	Dec	Year
Record high °C (°F)	15.5 (59.9)	20.0 (68.0)	25.5 (77.9)	30.1 (86.2)	32.8 (91.0)	36.7 (98.1)	38.3 (100.9)	37.2 (99.0)	35.3 (95.5)	30.5 (86.9)	24.3 (75.7)	19.4 (66.9)	38.3 (100.9)
Mean daily maximum °C (°F)	5.0 (41.0)	6.6 (43.9)	11.1 (52.0)	17.4 (63.3)	22.6 (72.7)	25.3 (77.5)	28.6 (83.5)	30.2 (86.4)	25.8 (78.4)	19.9 (67.8)	13.7 (56.7)	7.8 (46.0)	17.9 (64.2)
Daily mean °C (°F)	−0.7 (30.7)	0.4 (32.7)	4.4 (39.9)	10.3 (50.5)	15.9 (60.6)	19.5 (67.1)	23.2 (73.8)	24.0 (75.2)	19.9 (67.8)	13.6 (56.5)	7.2 (45.0)	1.9 (35.4)	11.7 (53.1)
Mean daily minimum °C (°F)	−6.2 (20.8)	−5.4 (22.3)	−1.7 (28.9)	3.6 (38.5)	9.8 (49.6)	14.8 (58.6)	18.9 (66.0)	19.5 (67.1)	15.4 (59.7)	8.4 (47.1)	1.6 (34.9)	−3.3 (26.1)	6.3 (43.3)
Record low °C (°F)	−17.9 (−0.2)	−17.2 (1.0)	−13.6 (7.5)	−12.5 (9.5)	0.3 (32.5)	6.5 (43.7)	12.3 (54.1)	11.2 (52.2)	3.2 (37.8)	−3.5 (25.7)	−7.2 (19.0)	−13.3 (8.1)	−17.9 (−0.2)
Average precipitation mm (inches)	48.9 (1.93)	70.4 (2.77)	121.5 (4.78)	125.1 (4.93)	143.6 (5.65)	185.3 (7.30)	194.5 (7.66)	131.7 (5.19)	169.6 (6.68)	148.7 (5.85)	90.1 (3.55)	57.4 (2.26)	1,454 (57.24)
Average precipitation days (≥ 1.0 mm)	5.4	5.9	9.2	9.5	9.8	12.7	12.6	10.0	10.4	9.3	7.4	6.1	108.5
Mean monthly sunshine hours	162.2	166.5	187.7	197.2	206.2	158.9	167.6	207.5	158.8	165.3	156.4	151.6	2,094.2
Source: Japan Meteorological Agency (1993–2020 normals, extremes 1993–present)

== History ==
The area of present-day Ina was part of ancient Shinano Province. The area was part of the holdings of Takatō Domain during the Edo period and Ina developed as a jōkamachi surrounding Ina Castle and as a river port on the Tenryū River. The village of Ina was established within Ina District the creation of the municipalities system on April 1, 1889, and was raised to town status on October 15, 1897. The town of Ina merged with the villages of Tomigata, Misuzu, Tera, Higashiharuchika and Nishiminowa (all from Kitaiina District) to form the city of Ina on April 1, 1954. Ina annexed the village of Nishiharuchika in 1965. On March 31, 2006, Ina absorbed the town of Takatō, and the village of Hase (both from Kamiina District to create the new and expanded city of Ina.

== Demographics ==
Per Japanese census data, the population of Ina has remained relatively stable over the past 70 years.

Historical population
Year	Pop.	±%
1940	60,997	—
1950	72,314	+18.6%
1960	68,691	−5.0%
1970	65,347	−4.9%
1980	67,544	+3.4%
1990	70,639	+4.6%
2000	71,552	+1.3%
2010	71,100	−0.6%
2020	66,125	−7.0%

== Government ==
Ina has a mayor-council form of government with a directly elected mayor and a unicameral city legislature of 21 members.

== Economy ==
The economy of Ina is largely agricultural, with rice, pears, tomatoes and dairy farming as major components. The manufacturing sector includes electronics and precision instrumentation. Rubycon Corporation, an electronic components company has its headquarters in the city.

== Education ==
Ina has 15 public elementary schools and six public middle schools operated by the city government. There are three public high schools operated by the Nagano Prefectural Board of Education and one private high school. The prefecture also operated one special education school.

The city has one international school (Colégio Desafio) - Brazilian primary school.

== Transportation ==
=== Railway ===
- East Japan Railway Company - Iida Line
  - Akagi - Sawando - Shimojima - Inashi - Ina-Kita

=== Highway ===
- Nagano Expressway
- National Route 152
- National Route 153
- National Route 361

== Sister city relations ==
=== International ===
- - Beijing, China (from on November 22, 1994, as a friendship city)

=== Domestic ===
- Chita, Aichi Prefecture (from November 7, 1994, as a friendship city)
- Miyake, Tokyo (became allies on April 21, 1970)
- Shinjuku, Tokyo (from July 12, 1986)
- Aizuwakamatsu, Fukushima (from September 24, 2004)
- Iwanashiro, Fukushima (from September 23, 1994)
- Iwata, Shizuoka Prefecture (became allies on August 1, 1984)

== Local attractions ==
- Takatō Castle
