= Kamikatagiri Station =

Railway station in Matsukawa, Nagano Prefecture, Japan

Kamikatagiri Station 上片桐駅
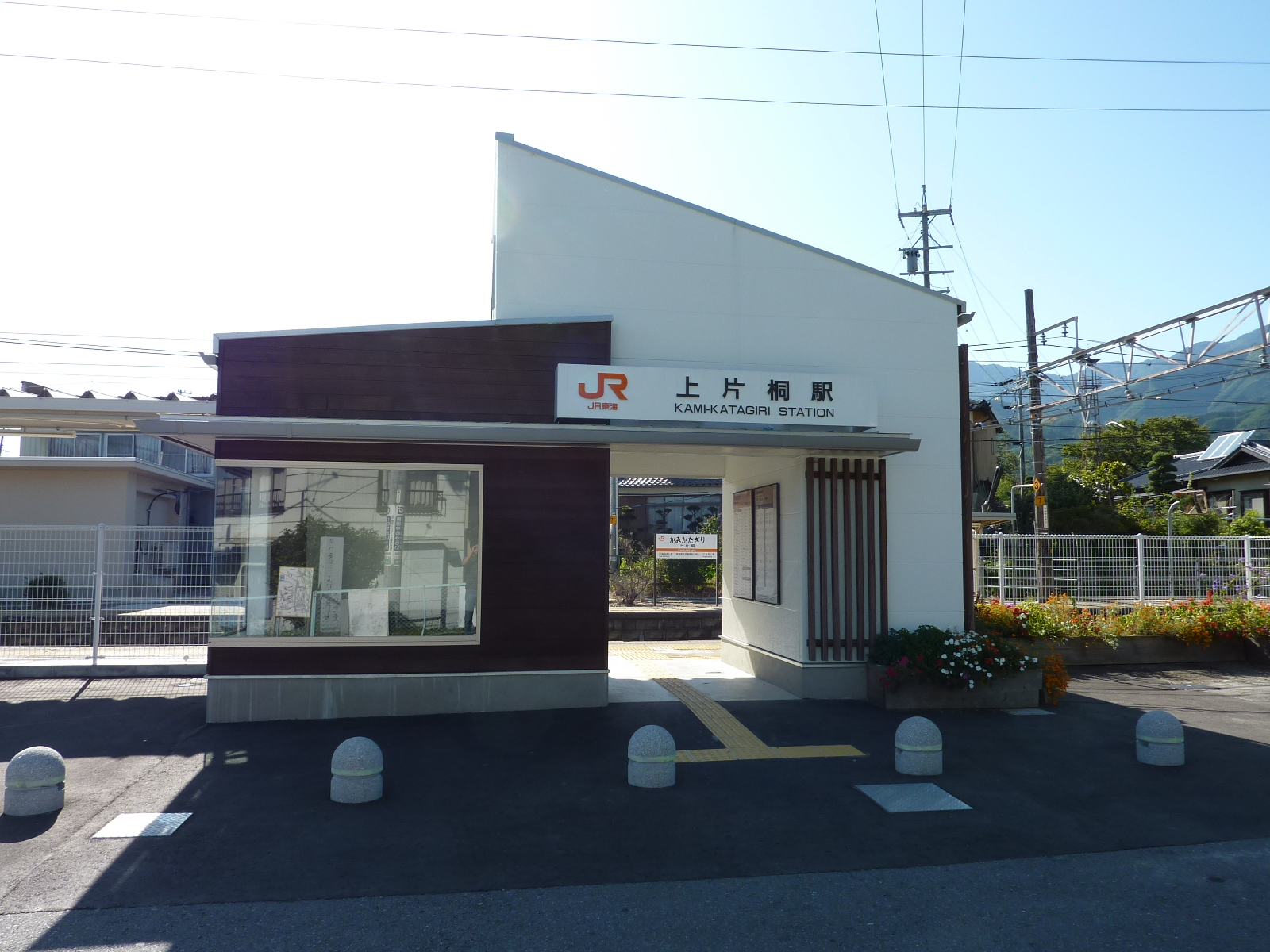
- Kamikatagiri Station in September 2009

General information
- Location: Kamikatagiri, Matsukawa-cho, Shimoina-gun, Nagano-ken 399-3301; Japan
- Coordinates: 35.6178°N 137.9041°E
- Elevation: 607 m (1,991 ft)
- Operator: JR Central
- Line: Iida Line
- Distance: 146.9 km from Toyohashi
- Platforms: 2 side platforms

Other information
- Status: Unstaffed

History
- Opened: 22 November 1920

Passengers
- FY2016: 384 (daily)
Location
- Location within Nagano Prefecture Location within Japan

Kamikatagiri Station (上片桐駅, Kamikatagiri-eki) is a railway station on the Iida Line in the town of Matsukawa, Shimoina District, Nagano Prefecture, Japan operated by Central Japan Railway Company (JR Central).

== Lines ==
Kamikatagiri Station is served by the Iida Line and is 146.9 kilometers from the starting point of the line at Toyohashi Station.

== Station layout ==
The station consists of two opposed ground-level side platforms connected by a level crossing. The station is unattended.

=== Platforms ===
1	■ Iida Line	for Iida and Tenryūkyō
2	■ Iida Line	for Tatsuno

== Adjacent stations ==
«	Service	»
Iida Line
Ina-Ōshima	Rapid Misuzu (快速みすず)	Nanakubo
Ina-Ōshima	Local	Ina-Tajima

== History ==
Kamikatagiri Station opened on 22 November 1920. With the privatization of Japanese National Railways (JNR) on 1 April 1987, the station came under the control of JR Central. A new station building was completed in February 2009.

== Passenger statistics ==
In fiscal 2016, the station was used by an average of 384 passengers daily (boarding passengers only).

== Surrounding area ==
- Matsukawa High School

== See also ==
- List of railway stations in Japan
