= Miwa Dam =

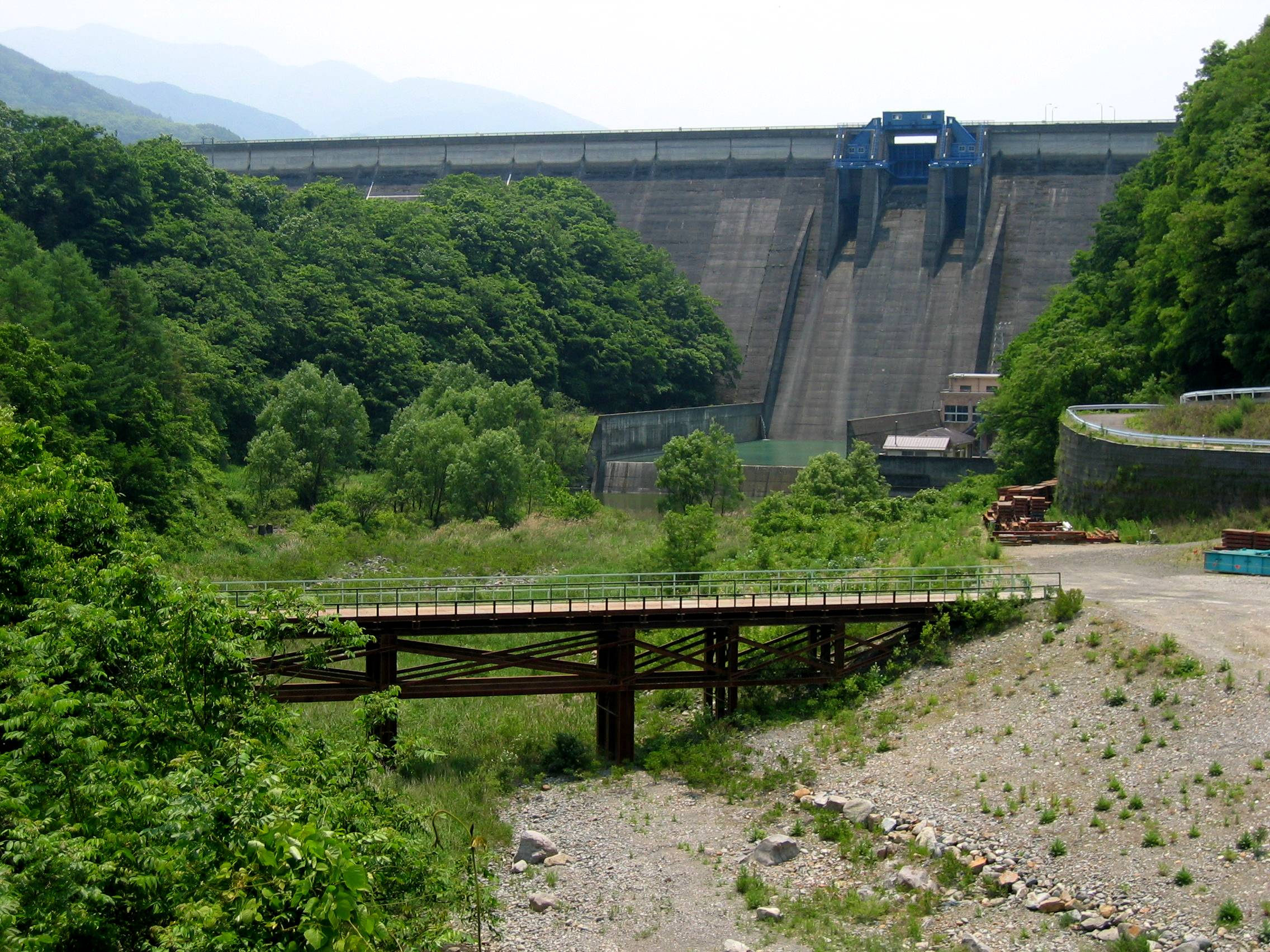
- Interactive map of Miwa Dam
- Location: Nagano Prefecture, Japan
- Coordinates: 35°48′51″N 138°04′45″E

Dam and spillways
- Type of dam: gravity concrete dam
- Height: 69 m (226 ft)
- Dam volume: 29.95 million cubic M

Power Station
- Operator: Ministry of Land
- Installed capacity: 12.2 MW

Miwa Dam (Japanese: 美和ダム) is a dam in the Nagano Prefecture, Japan, completed in 1959.
