= Via Narenta =

- Neretvanski put
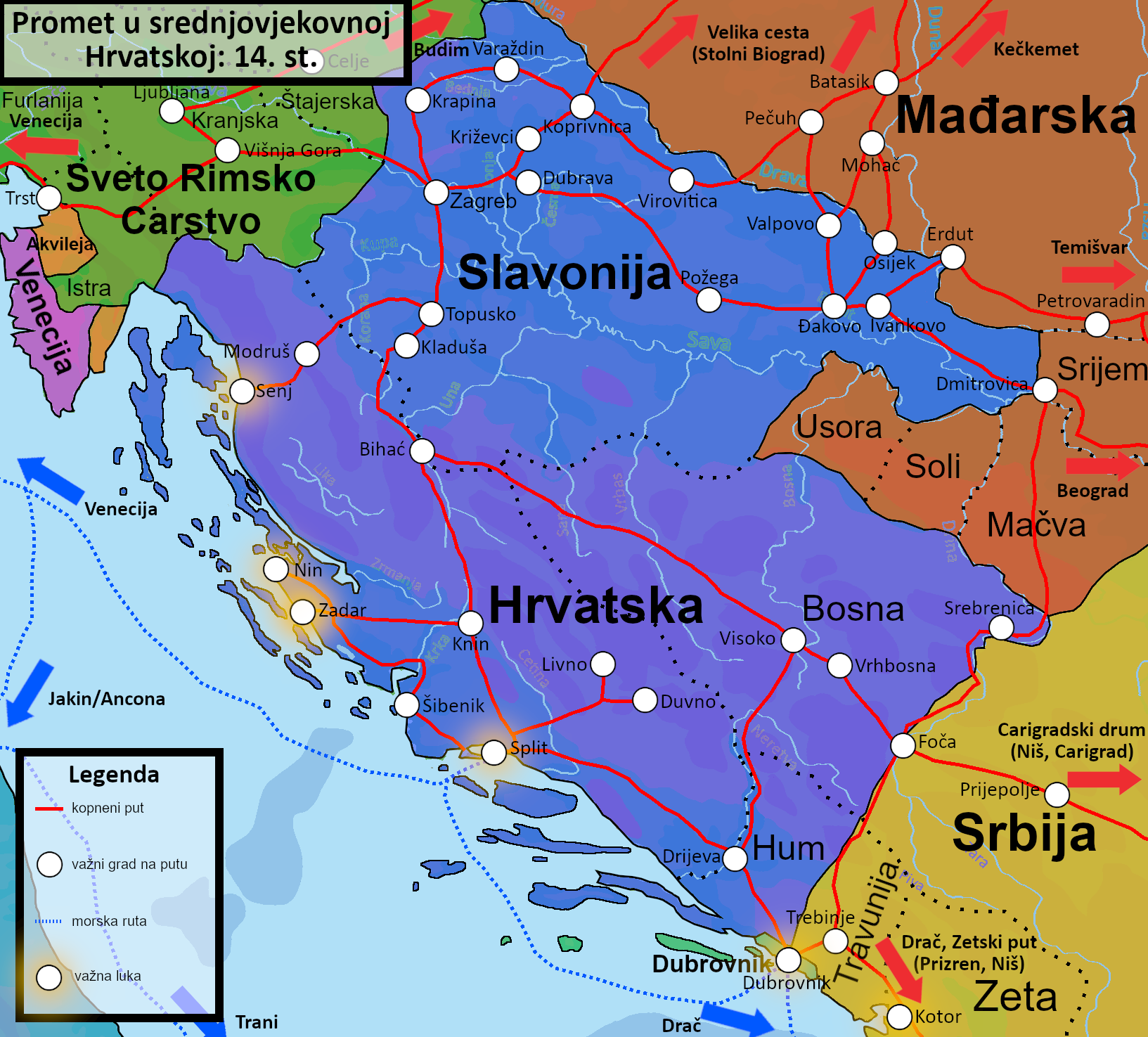
- Via Narenta (bottom right) on the map of the roads in Croatian lands in the 14th century
- Interactive map of Via Narenta
- 42°38′25″N 18°06′30″E
- Location: Dubrovnik, Drijeva to Visoko

Via Narenta, sometimes also Via Bosna or Neretvanski put, was a medieval trade route through the Dinaric Alps that connected Dubrovnik (Republic of Ragusa) through the Neretva river valley with the Bosna river valley, and from there to various places in medieval Croatia, medieval Bosnia and the rest of the Balkans.

The route went through Drijeva (an intersection near today's Gabela), following the river up to Prenj and Konjic, where it turned northward to Visoko.

It was one of the two main routes from Bosnia and Croatia to Dubrovnik; the other was Via Drine that reached the Drina.

== Sources ==
- Šebečić, Berislav (December 2002). "Srebreni putevi u Europi početkom novog vijeka i rudarsko-financijski imperiji Fuggerovih" [Silver routes in Europe at the beginning of new age and the Fuggers' mining-financial empires]. The Mining-geological-petroleum Engineering Bulletin (in Croatian). 14 (1). Faculty of mining, geology and petroleum engineering, University of Zagreb.
- Lorger, Srećko (2011). "Kermes, crvac - i još neka crvena bojila" [The Semantic World of Tints and Dyes: Crvac in Fifteenth-Century Dubrovnik]. Anali Zavoda za Povijesne Znanosti Hrvatske Akademije Znanosti i Umjetnosti u Dubrovniku (in Croatian) (49). Croatian Academy of Sciences and Arts: 56.
