= Kōshin'etsu region =

Subregion of Chūbu, Japan

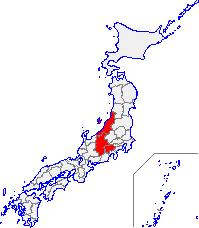
Koshin'etsu region

Kōshin'etsu (甲信越) is a subregion of the Chūbu region in Japan consisting of Yamanashi, Nagano, and Niigata prefectures.

The name Kōshin'etsu is a composite formed from the names of old provinces which are adjacent to each other — Kai (now Yamanashi), Shinano (now Nagano) and Echigo (now Niigata). The region is surrounded by the Sea of Japan to its north west, Hokuriku region to its west, Tōkai region to its south west, Kantō region to its south east, and Tōhoku region to its north east. The name for this geographic area is usually combined with Kantō region (as in "Kantō-Kōshin'etsu"); and it is sometimes combined with Hokuriku region (as in "Kantō-Kōshin'etsu-Hokuriku" or "Hokuriku-Kōshin'etsu").

== Corporate usage ==
- Nippon Telegraph & Telephone directories categorize phone numbers by region, including the Koshin'etsu area.
- The Japanese Society of Nuclear Medicine categorizes its membership by region, including the Kanto-Koshinetsu region.
- In Japan, the Children's Cancer Registry program is administered by seven National Children's Medical Registration Centers, including Kanto-KoShinEtsu.

== Economy ==
The Kōshin'etsu subregion economy is for almost all purposes the same as the Shin'etsu subregion economy. The economy of Kōshin'etsu subregion is large and highly diversified with a strong focus on silverware, electronics, information technology, precision machinery, agriculture and food products, and tourism. It also produces crude oil. Until 1989, the Kōshin'etsu subregion also partook in gold mining, particularly at Sado Island.

== Demographics ==
Per Japanese census data, Kōshin'etsu subregion has had negative population growth since 2000.

Historical population
Year	Pop.	±%
1920	3,922,000	—
1930	4,281,000	+9.2%
1940	4,438,000	+3.7%
1950	5,333,000	+20.2%
1960	5,205,500	−2.4%
1970	5,080,000	−2.4%
1980	5,339,000	+5.1%
1990	5,484,000	+2.7%
2000	5,579,073	+1.7%
2010	5,389,974	−3.4%
2020	5,097,181	−5.4%

== See also ==
- Aging of Japan
- Hokuriku region
- Kantō region
- Shin'etsu region
- Tōkai region
- Kōshin Chihō (Central Highland)
