= Kamiina District, Nagano =

District in Nagano Prefecture, Japan

Coordinates: 35.796°N 137.862°E

Kamiina (上伊那郡, Kamiina-gun) is a district located in southern Nagano Prefecture, Japan.

As of May 2008, the district has an estimated population of 86,453 with a density of 168 persons per km^{2}. The total area is 514.55 km^{2}.

On the other hand, if the cities of Ina and Komagane were included, the area will be known as the Kamiina Region.

== Municipalities ==
The district consists of three towns and three villages:

- Iijima (Note: Classified as a town.)
- Minamiminowa (Note: Classified as a village.)
- Minowa
- Miyada
- Nakagawa
- Tatsuno

== History ==
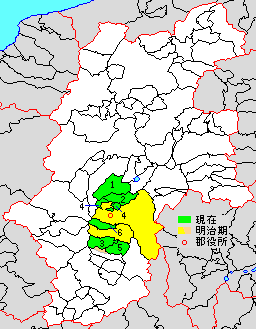
Map showing original extent of Kamiina District in Nagano Prefecture: * yellow - areas formerly within the district borders during the early Meiji period: 1. Tatsuno-machi; 2. Minowa-machi; 3. Iijima-machi; 4. Minamiminowa-mura; 5. Nakagawa-mura; 6. Miyada-mura

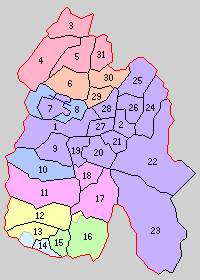
Colored areas are in this district.

- January 4, 1879 - Ina District was split off into Kamiina and Shimoina Districts during the early Meiji period establishment of the municipalities system, which initially consisted of 2 towns and 26 villages. Its district headquarters was located at the village of at Ina.

=== District Timeline ===
- April 1, 1954 - The towns of Ina merged with the villages of Tomigata, Midori, Shura, Higashiharuchika, and Nishiminowa to form the city of Ina.
- July 1, 1954 - The towns of Akaho and Miyada merged with the villages of Ina and Nakazawa to form the city of Komagane.
- January 1, 1955 - The town of Nakaminowa merged with the villages of Minowa and Higashiminowa to form the town of Minowa.
- April 1, 1955-The town of Tatsuno merged with the village of Asahi to form the new town of Tatsuno.
- September 30, 1956:
  - The town of Tatsuno absorbed the village of Kawashima.
  - The town of Takatō merged with the villages of Nagafuji and Miyoshi to form the new town of Takatō.
  - The town of Iijima merged with the village of Nanakubo to form the new town of Iijima.
  - The village of Miyada broke off from the city of Komagane.
  - The town of Kamikatado merged with the village of Oshima from Shimoina District to form the town of Matsukawa in Shimoina District.
- April 1, 1958 - The town of Takatō absorbed the village of Fujisawa.
- August 1, 1958 - The villages of Nanko and Katado merged to form the village of Nakagawa.
- April 1, 1959 - The villages of Inari and Miwa merged to form the town of Hase.
- March 31, 1961 - The town of Tatsuno absorbed the village of Ono.
- April 1, 1965 - The town of Takatō absorbed the village of Kawanan.
- April 1, 1965 - The city of Ina absorbed the village of Nishiharuchika.

=== Recent mergers ===
- March 31, 2006 - The town of Takatō and the village of Hase were merged with the former city of Ina (1st) to form the new city of Ina (2nd).
