= Japan National Route 153 =

National highway in Japan

National Route 153
- 国道153号
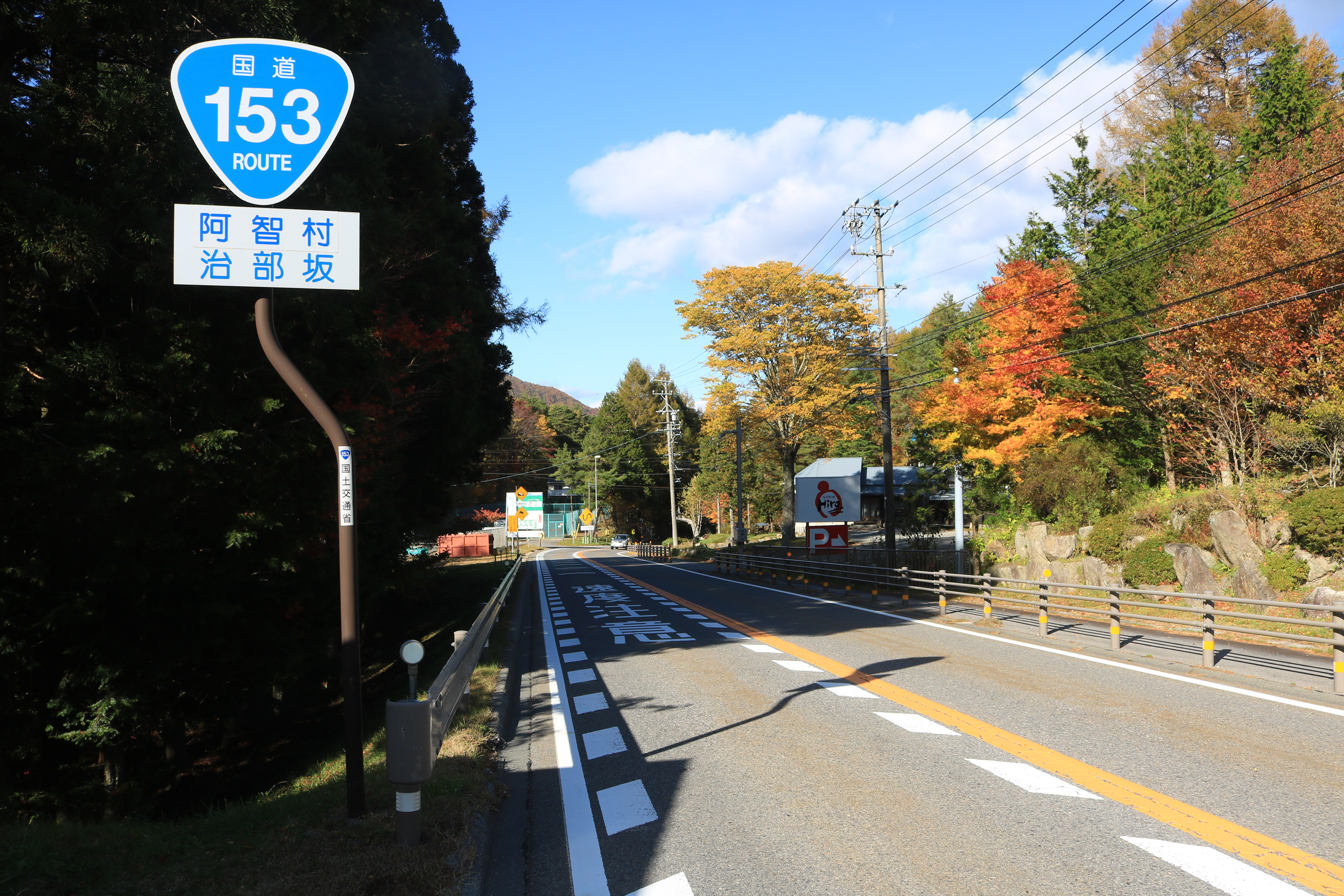

Route information
- Length: 213.4 km (132.6 mi)
- Existed: 1953–present

Major junctions
- North end: National Route 19 / National Route 20 in Shiojiri, Nagano
- South end: National Route 19 in Higashi-ku, Nagoya

Location
- Country: Japan

Highway system
- National highways of Japan; Expressways of Japan
← National Route 152	→ National Route 154

National Route 153 is a national highway of Japan connecting Higashi-ku, Nagoya and Shiojiri, Nagano in Japan, with a total length of 213.4 km (132.6 mi).
