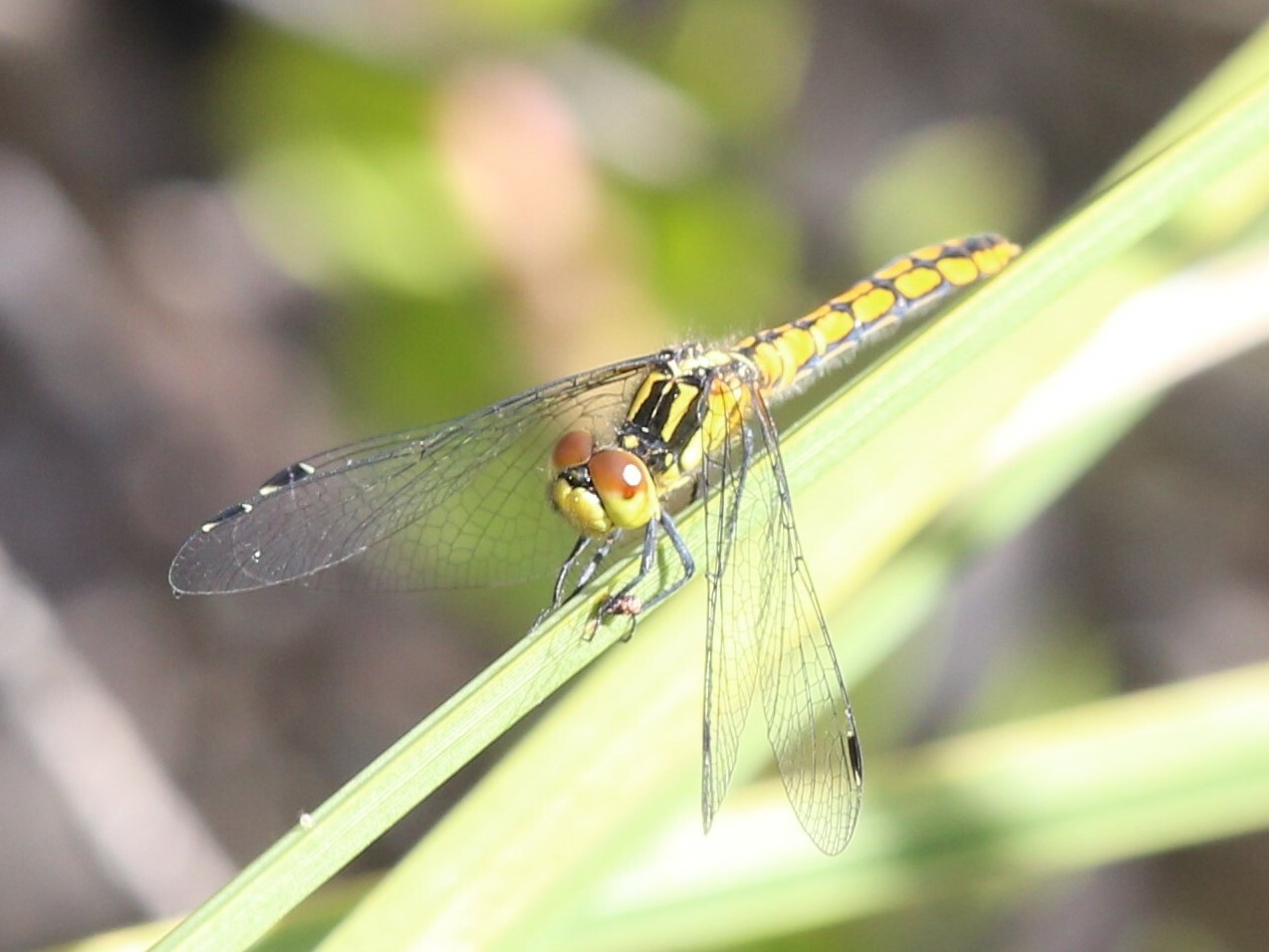

Conservation status
- Least Concern (IUCN 3.1)

Scientific classification
- Kingdom: Animalia
- Phylum: Arthropoda
- Clade: Pancrustacea
- Class: Insecta
- Order: Odonata
- Suborder: Anisoptera
- Superfamily: Libelluloidea
- Family: Libellulidae
- Genus: Nannophya
- Species: N. occidentalis

Binomial name
- Nannophya occidentalis (Tillyard, 1908)

Synonyms
- Nannodythemis occidentalis Tillyard, 1908

= Nannophya occidentalis =

Western pygmyfly

Species of dragonfly

Nannophya occidentalis, also known as the western pygmyfly,, is a species of dragonfly in the family Libellulidae. It is found in boggy seepages and swamps of south-western Australia.

Nannophya occidentalis is a small dragonfly with black and red markings similar to Nannophya dalei, the eastern pygmyfly, which is found in south-eastern Australia.

== Etymology ==
The genus name Nannophya combines the Greek νάννος (nannos, "dwarf") with φυή (phyē, "form", "stature" or "growth"). The name refers to the small size of members of the genus.

The species name occidentalis is derived from the Latin occidens ("west" or "western"), referring to its south-western Australian habitat.

== Gallery ==
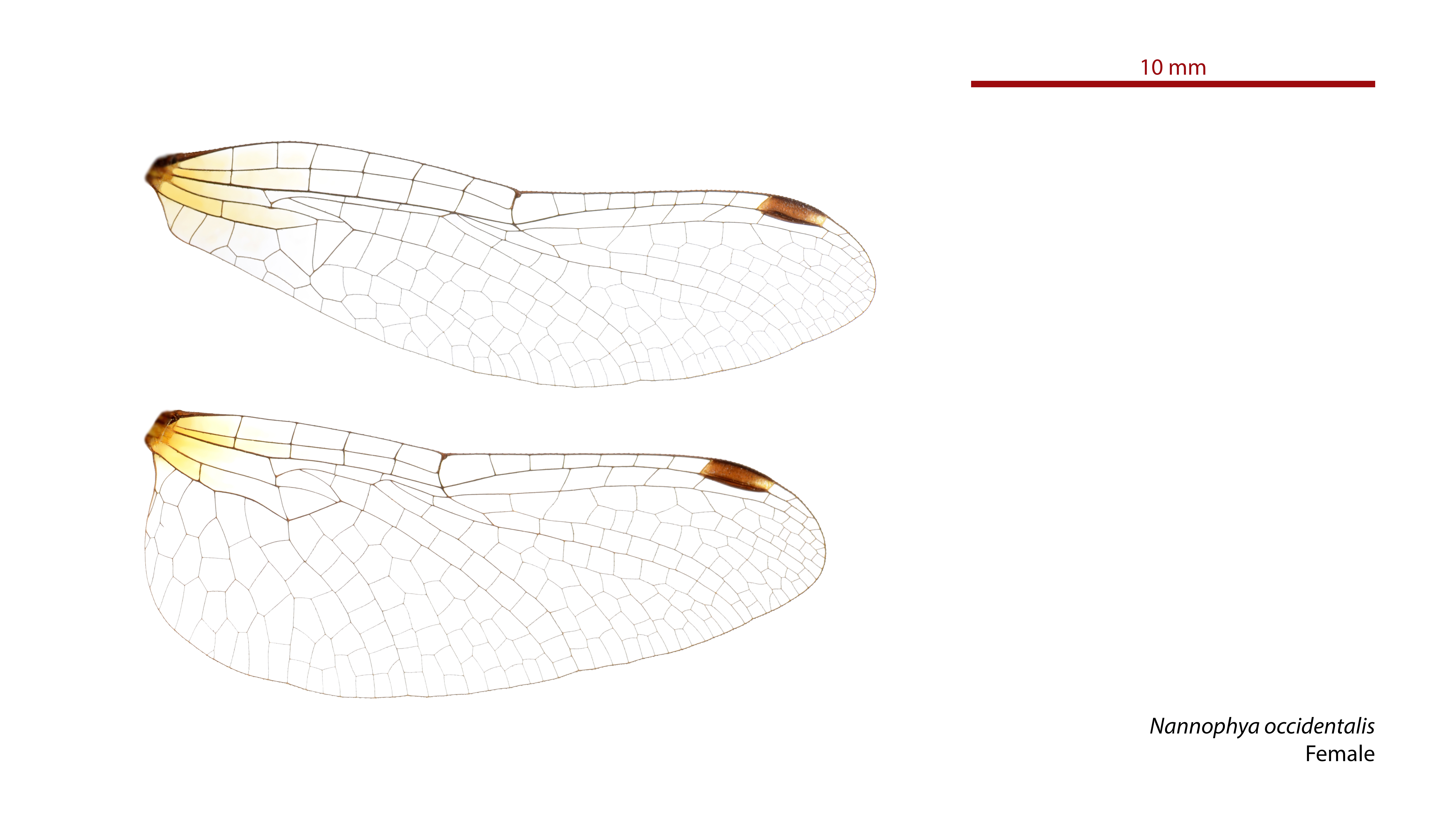
Female wings

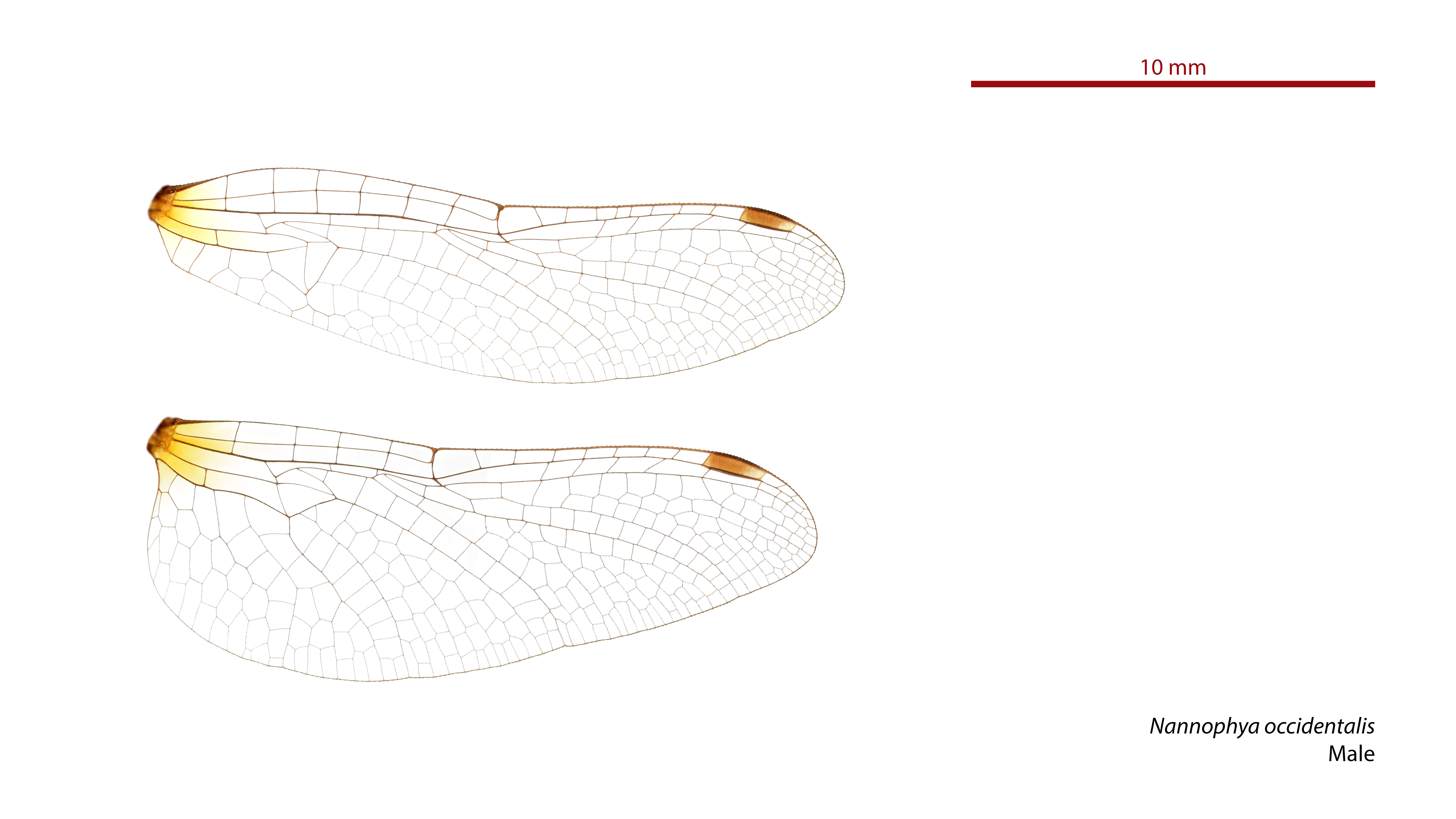
Male wings

== See also ==
- List of Odonata species of Australia
