= Akagi Station =

Akagi Station is the name of two train stations in Japan:

- Akagi Station (Gunma) (赤城駅)
- Akagi Station (Nagano) (赤木駅)
