= Ōtagiri Station =

Railway station in Komagane, Nagano Prefecture, Japan

Ōtagiri Station 大田切駅
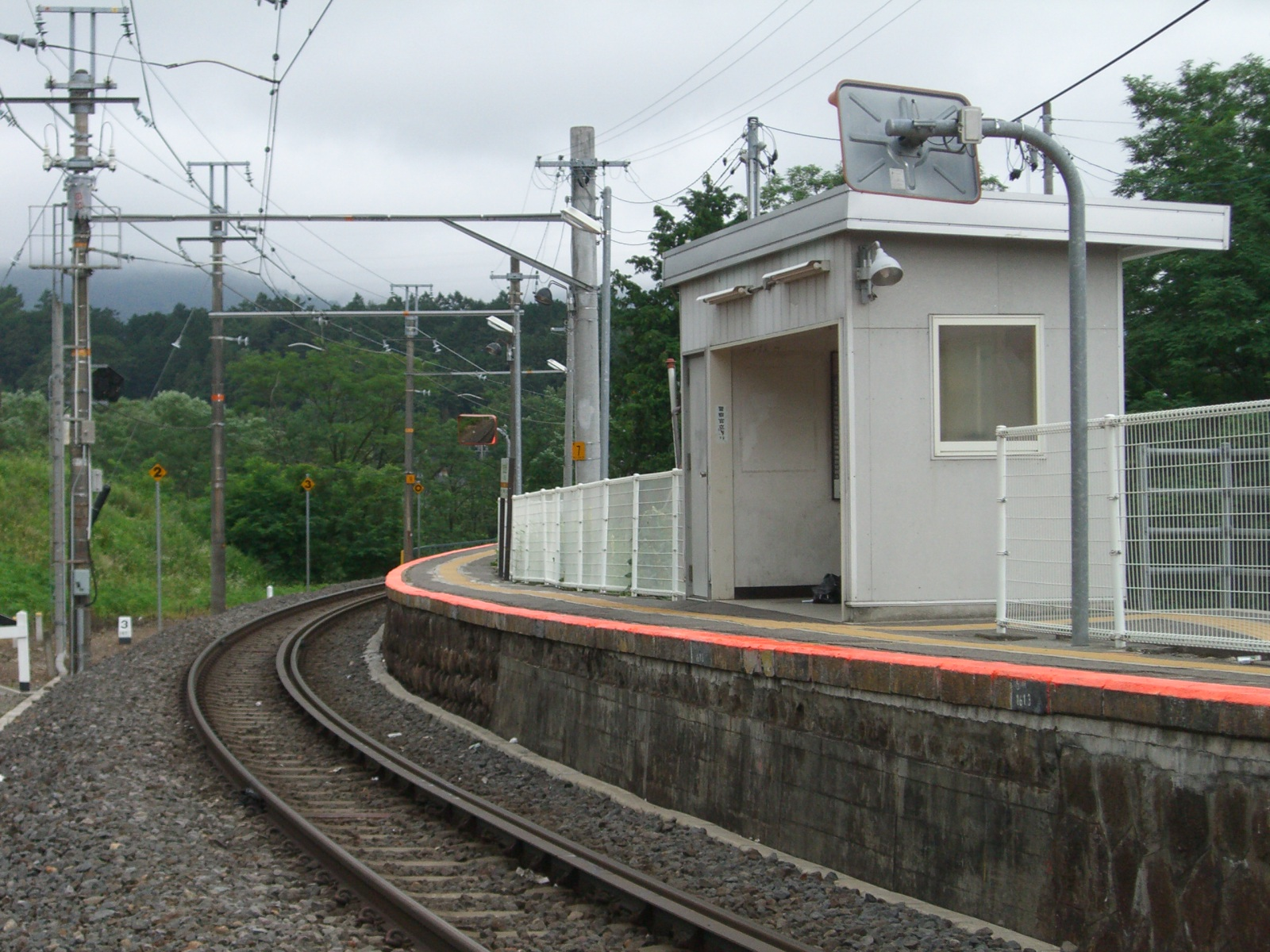
- Ōtagiri Station in July 2008

General information
- Location: Ōtagiri, Komagane-shi, Nagano-ken 399-7501; Japan
- Coordinates: 35.7482°N 137.9403°E
- Elevation: 649 meters
- Operator: JR Central
- Line: Iida Line
- Distance: 167.0 km from Toyohashi
- Platforms: 1 side platform

Other information
- Status: Unstaffed

History
- Opened: 1 September 1946

Passengers
- FY2017: 97 (daily)
Location
- Location within Nagano Prefecture Location within Japan

Ōtagiri Station (大田切駅, Ōtagiri-eki) is a railway station on the Iida Line in the city of Komagane, Nagano Prefecture, Japan, operated by Central Japan Railway Company (JR Central).

== Lines ==
Ōtagiri Station is served by the Iida Line and is 167.0 kilometers from the starting point of the line at Toyohashi Station.

== Station layout ==
The station consists of one ground-level side platform serving one bi-directional track. There is no station building, but only a shelter built on the platform. The station is unattended.

== Adjacent stations ==
«	Service	»
Iida Line
Komagane	Rapid Misuzu	Miyada
Komagane	Local	Miyada

== History ==
Ōtagiri Station opened as a provisional stop on 31 October 1914. It was closed with the nationalization of the Ina Electric Railway on 1 August 1943, and reopened as a JNR passenger station on 1 September 1946. With the privatization of Japanese National Railways (JNR) on 1 April 1987, the station came under the control of JR Central.

== Passenger statistics ==
In fiscal 2015, the station was used by an average of 97 passengers daily (boarding passengers only).

== Surrounding area ==
- National Route 153
- Nagano College of Nursing

== See also ==
- List of railway stations in Japan
