= Komagane =

Komagane 駒ヶ根市
- City
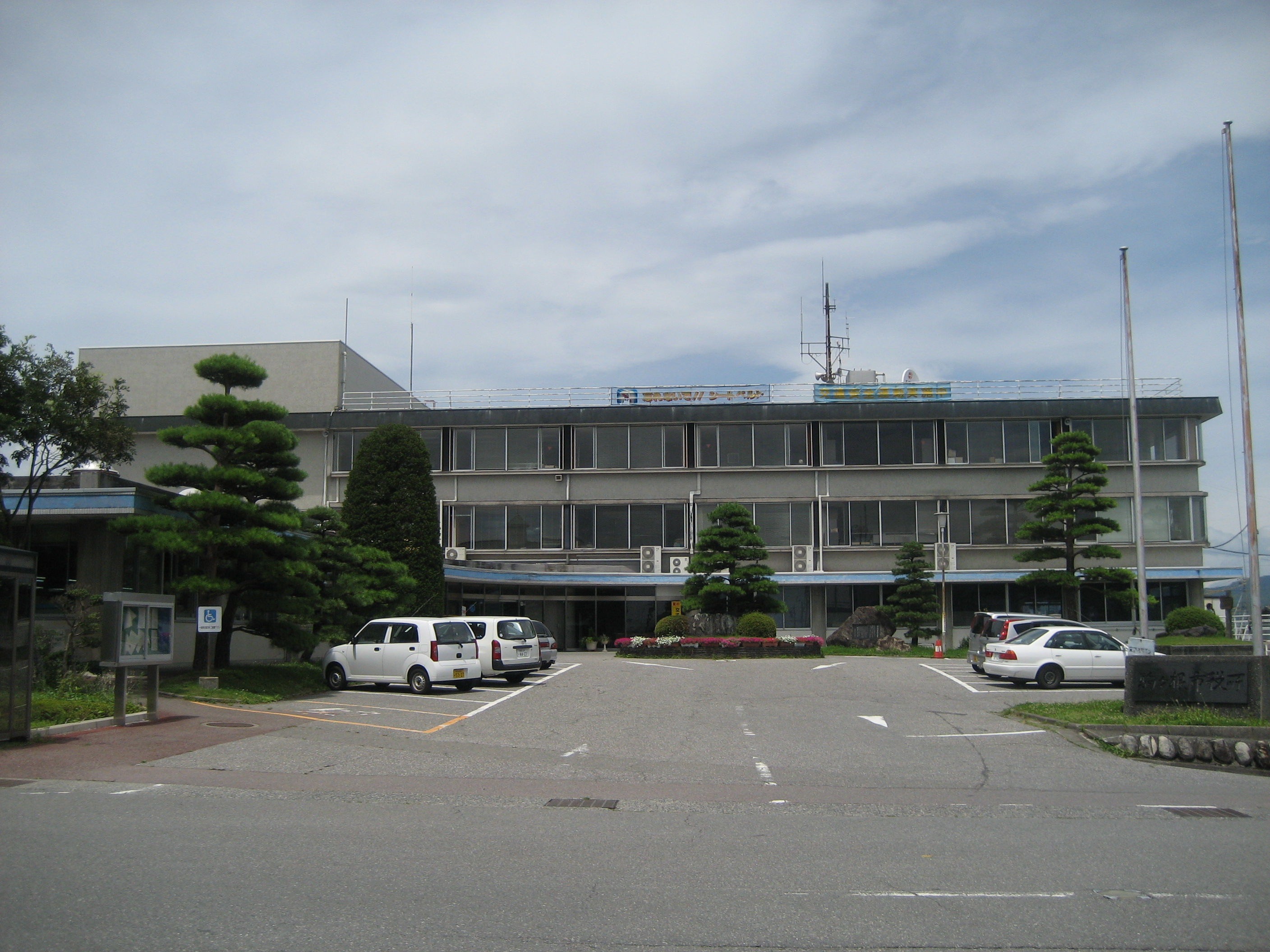
- Komagane City Hall

- Flag Seal

- Location of Komagane in Nagano

- Coordinates: 35°43′43.6″N 137°56′1.9″E
- Country: Japan
- Region: Chūbu (Kōshin'etsu)
- Prefecture: Nagano

Area
  - Total: 165.86 km^{2} (64.04 sq mi)

Population (February 2019)
  - Total: 32,210
  - Density: 194.2/km^{2} (503.0/sq mi)
- Time zone: UTC+9 (Japan Standard Time)
- Symbols
  - Tree: Pinus densiflora
  - Flower: Lily of the valley
  - Insect: Scarlet dwarf dragonfly
- Phone number: 0265-83-2111
- Address: 20-1 Akasu-cho, Komagane-shi, Nagano-ken 399-4129
- Website: Official website

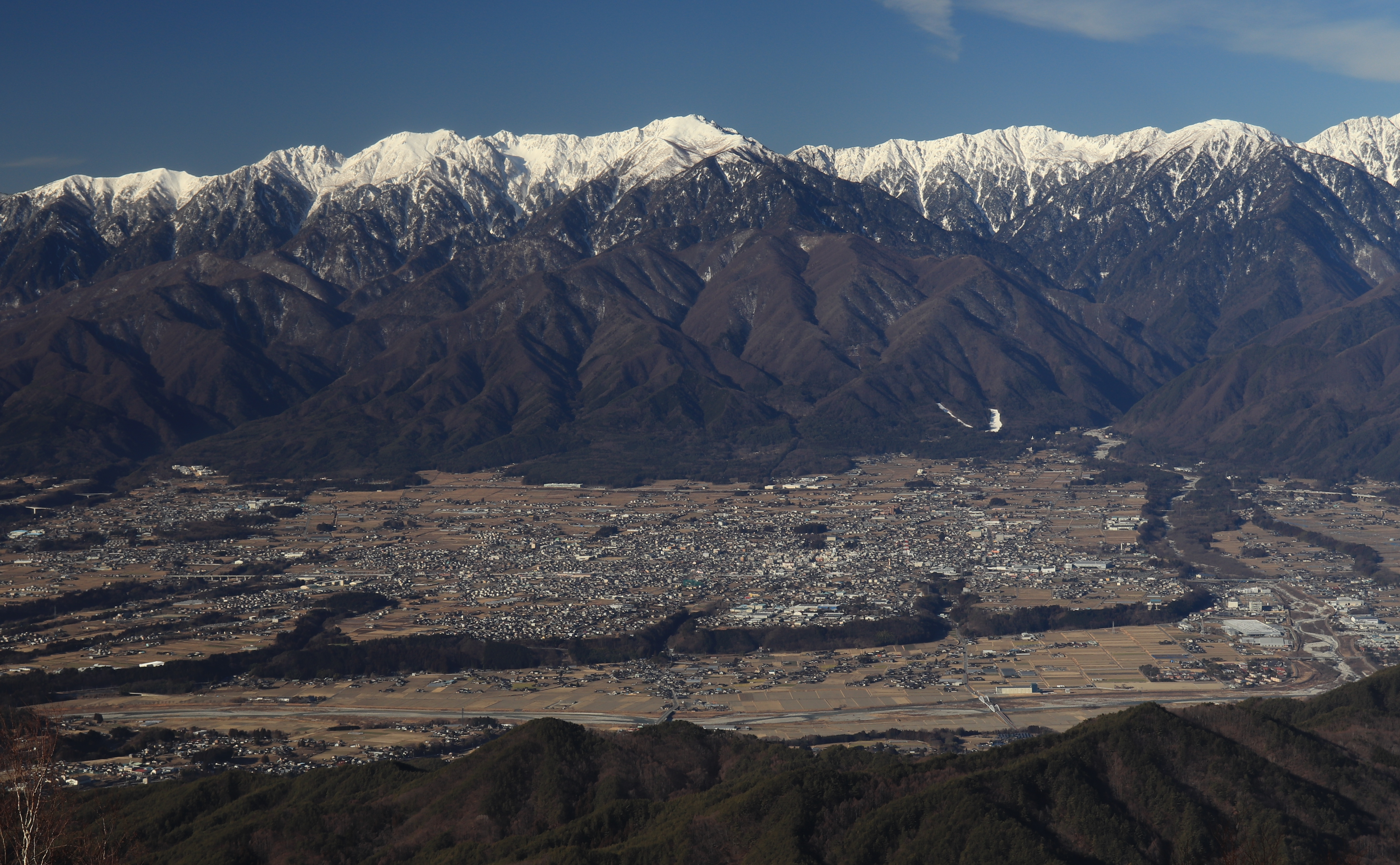
Komagane City from Mount Tokura

Komagane (駒ヶ根市, Komagane-shi) is a city located in Nagano Prefecture, Japan. As of 1 February 2019, the city had an estimated population of 32,210 in 12,937 households, and a population density of 190 persons per km^{2}. The total area of the city is 165.86 square kilometres (64.04 sq mi).

== Geography ==
Komagane is located in a north-south valley of the Tenryu River between the Central and Southern Alps in south-central Nagano Prefecture at an average elevation of 676 meters. It is situated at the 220 km marker on the southern (Nagoya) branch of the Chūō Expressway.

=== Surrounding municipalities ===
- Nagano Prefecture
  - Agematsu
  - Iijima
  - Ina
  - Miyada
  - Nakagawa
  - Ōkuwa
  - Ōshika

=== Climate ===
The city has a climate characterized by hot and humid summers, and relatively mild winters (Köppen climate classification Cfa). The average annual temperature in Komagane is 11.7 °C. The average annual rainfall is 1,486 mm with September as the wettest month. The temperatures are highest on average in August, at around 24.3 °C, and lowest in January, at around -0.4 °C.

== Demographics ==
Per Japanese census data, the population of Komagane has remained relatively stable over recent decades.

Historical population
Year	Pop.	±%
1960	25,579	—
1970	28,913	+13.0%
1980	31,179	+7.8%
1990	32,771	+5.1%
2000	34,338	+4.8%
2010	33,696	−1.9%
2020	32,202	−4.4%

== History ==
The area of present-day Komagane was part of ancient Shinano Province. The city was founded on July 1, 1954 by the merger of the towns of Akaho and Miyata with the villages of Nakasawa and Ina (all from Kamiina District).

== Government ==
Komagane has a mayor-council form of government with a directly elected mayor and a unicameral city legislature of 15 members.

== Economy ==
The economy of Komagane is largely agricultural, with rice and pears, along with sake brewing as major components. The manufacturing sector includes electronics and precision instrumentation. Seasonal tourism is also an important contributor to the local economy.

== Education ==
Komagane has five public elementary schools and two public middle schools operated by the city government. The city has two public high schools operated by the Nagano Prefectural Board of Education. The Nagano College of Nursing is located in Komagane.

== Transportation ==
=== Railway ===
- Central Japan Railway Company - Iida Line
  - Ina-Fukuoka - Komachiya - Komagane - Ōtagiri

=== Highway ===
- Chūō Expressway
- National Route 153

== International relations ==
- - Pokhara, Nepal, sister city since April 18, 2001

== Local attractions ==
Despite relatively poor transportation infrastructure (there is no Shinkansen link and the existing railway is a single track local line), the city derives a large proportion of its overall income from tourism. The Silk Museum is situated to the east of the city, while on the western side of town the Komagatake Ropeway (gondola) ascends Mount Komagatake in the Central Alps. The city has several popular tourist hotels (including one on the mountain which is only accessible via the ropeway), a youth hostel, onsen and a ski resort.

- Kōzen-ji, Buddhist temple with Japanese garden, one of the National Places of Scenic Beauty.
