= Mujechineup =

- Location: Ulsan, South Korea

Ramsar Wetland
- Official name: Moojechineup
- Designated: 20 December 2007
- Reference no.: 1725

- Mujechineup
- Hangul: 무제치늪
- RR: Mujechineup
- MR: Mujech'inŭp

Moojechineup is a high moor located on Mt. Jeongjok in Ulsan, Korea. The name 'Mooje' came from a ritual praying for rain. Mooejechipneup has an area of 4 hectares, and it is composed of 4 swamps: first at 510m above sea level, second at 558m, and third and fourth at 630m. As a 6,000-year-old high moor, it is known to be the oldest high moor in Korea, and there are so many different fauna and flora species living at Moojechinuep. It was registered as a Ramsar Wetlands on December 20, 2007 and became the 7th Ramsar Wetlands in Korea.

== Significance ==
Known as the oldest high moor in Korea, Moojechineup is a home of 257 species of fauna and flora, including 50 species of marshy vegetation. According to Ramsar Convention, "various rare flora and fauna, including locally and nationally endangered species, have been identified." These include scarlet dwarf (Nannophya pygmaea) and Celachne japonica, known as Japanese endemic species. Moojechineup was designated as the 4th Wetland Protected area by the Ministry of Environment of Korea on August 8, 1999, and the 7th Ramsar Wetlands in Korea on December 20, 2007.

== Organisms ==
Animal

- Leopard cat (Prionailurus bengalensis)
- Small-eared cat (Felis bengalensis manchurica)
- Chinese water deer (Hydropotes inermis)
- Raccoon dog (Nyctereutes procyonoides)
- Hedgehog (Erinaceus amurensis)
- Scarlet dwarf (Nannophya pygmaea)
- Salamander (Hynobius leechi)

Plants

- Round-leaved sundew (Drosera rotundifolia)
- Bladderwort (Utricularia racemosa)
- Common yellow bladderwort (Utricularia bifida)
- Alder tree (Alnus japonica)
