= Nannophya paulsoni =

Scarlet pygmyfly

Conservation status
- Data Deficient (IUCN 3.1)

Scientific classification
- Kingdom: Animalia
- Phylum: Arthropoda
- Clade: Pancrustacea
- Class: Insecta
- Order: Odonata
- Suborder: Anisoptera
- Superfamily: Libelluloidea
- Family: Libellulidae
- Genus: Nannophya
- Species: N. paulsoni

Binomial name
- Nannophya paulsoni Theischinger, 2003

Species of dragonfly

Nannophya paulsoni is a species of dragonfly of the family Libellulidae, commonly known as the scarlet pygmyfly. It is a small dragonfly with red markings found in northern Australia.

Historically, Nannophya paulsoni had been recorded as Nannophya pygmaea in Australia.

== Etymology ==
The genus name Nannophya combines the Greek νάννος (nannos, "dwarf") with φυή (phyē, "form", "stature" or "growth"). The name refers to the small size of members of the genus.

In 2003, Günther Theischinger named this species paulsoni, an eponym honouring Dennis Paulson, a world authority on Odonata.

== Gallery ==
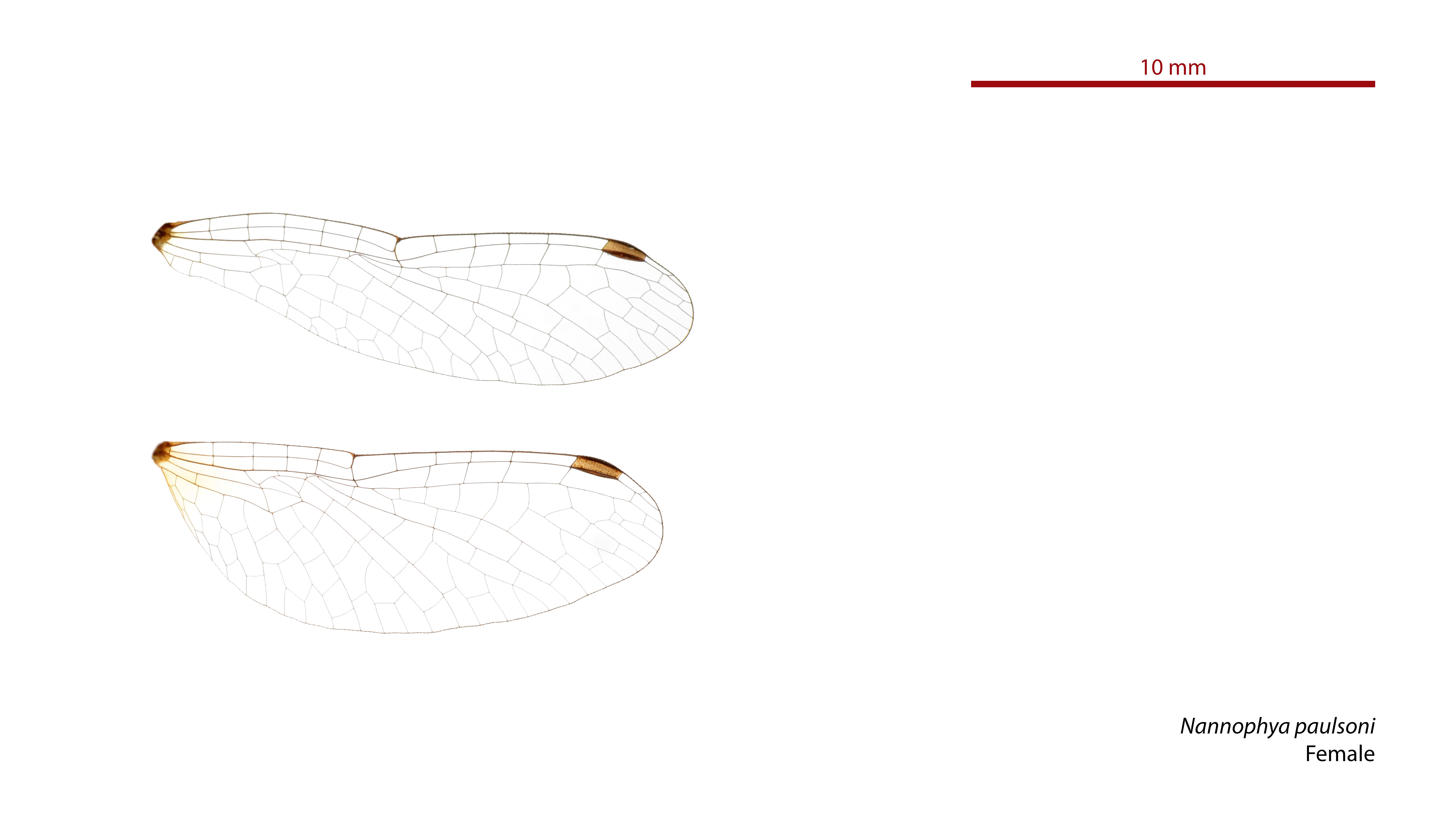
Female wings

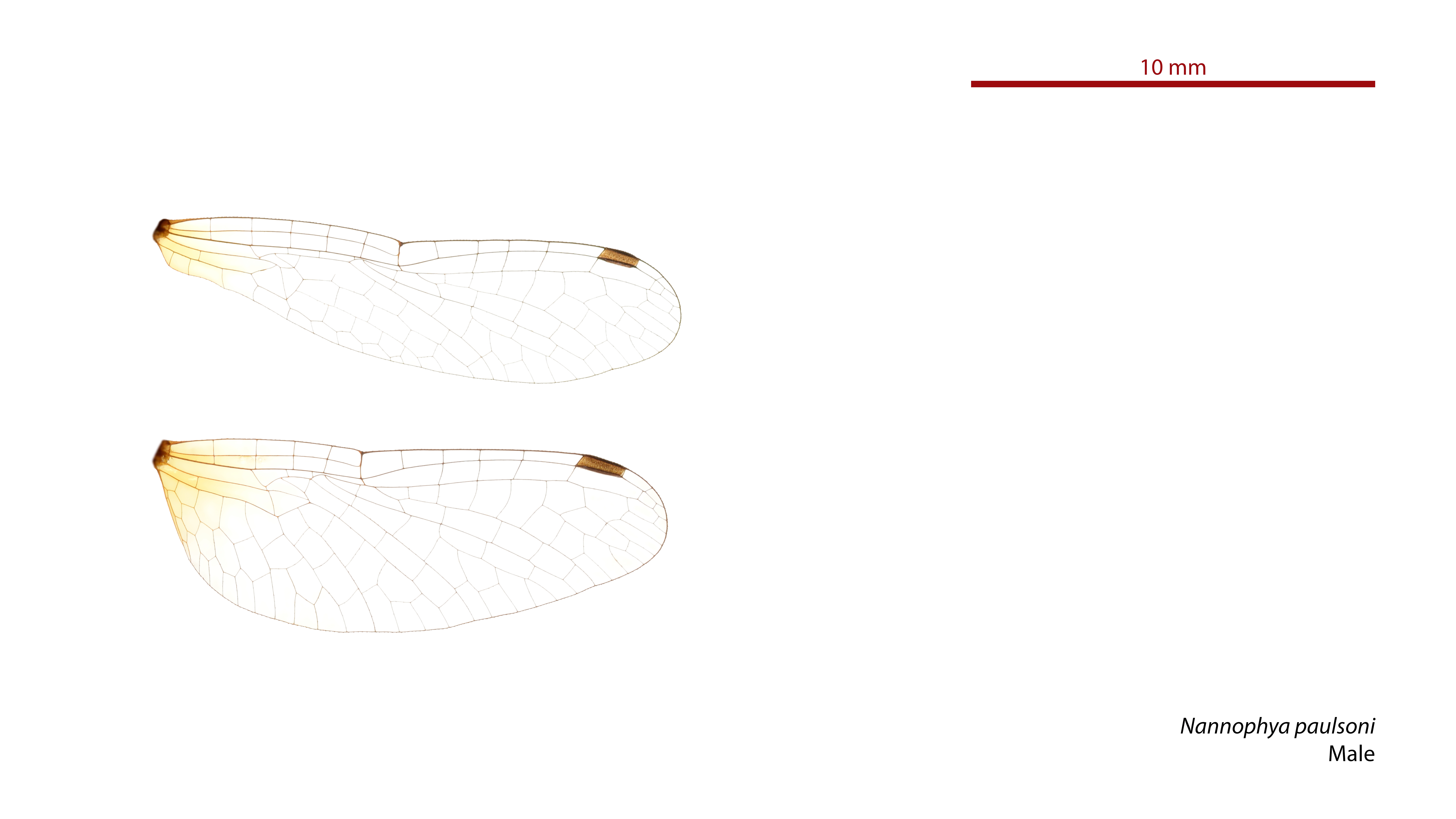
Male wings

== See also ==
- List of Odonata species of Australia
