= Shimojima Station =

Shimojima Station (下島駅) is the name of two train stations in Japan:

- Shimojima Station (Ina, Nagano)
- Shimojima Station (Matsumoto, Nagano)
