= Fukuoka Station (disambiguation) =

Fukuoka station may refer to:

== Stations in Fukuoka City, Kyushu ==
- Hakata Station, a major transport hub served by JR and Fukuoka City Subway
- Nishitetsu-Fukuoka (Tenjin) Station, station of Nishi-Nippon Railroad on its Tenjin Ōmuta Line

== Other ==
- Fukuoka Station, station of Ainokaze Toyama Railway in Toyama prefecture
- Ninohe Station, called Fukuoka station prior to 1921 and Kita-Fukuoka station prior to 1987
- Ina-Fukuoka Station, station of JR Central in Nagano Prefecture
- Mino-Fukuoka Station (abolished), Gifu Prefecture
- Kaga-Fukuoka Station (abolished), Ishikawa Prefecture

== See also ==
- Kami-Fukuoka Station
- Minami-Fukuoka Station
