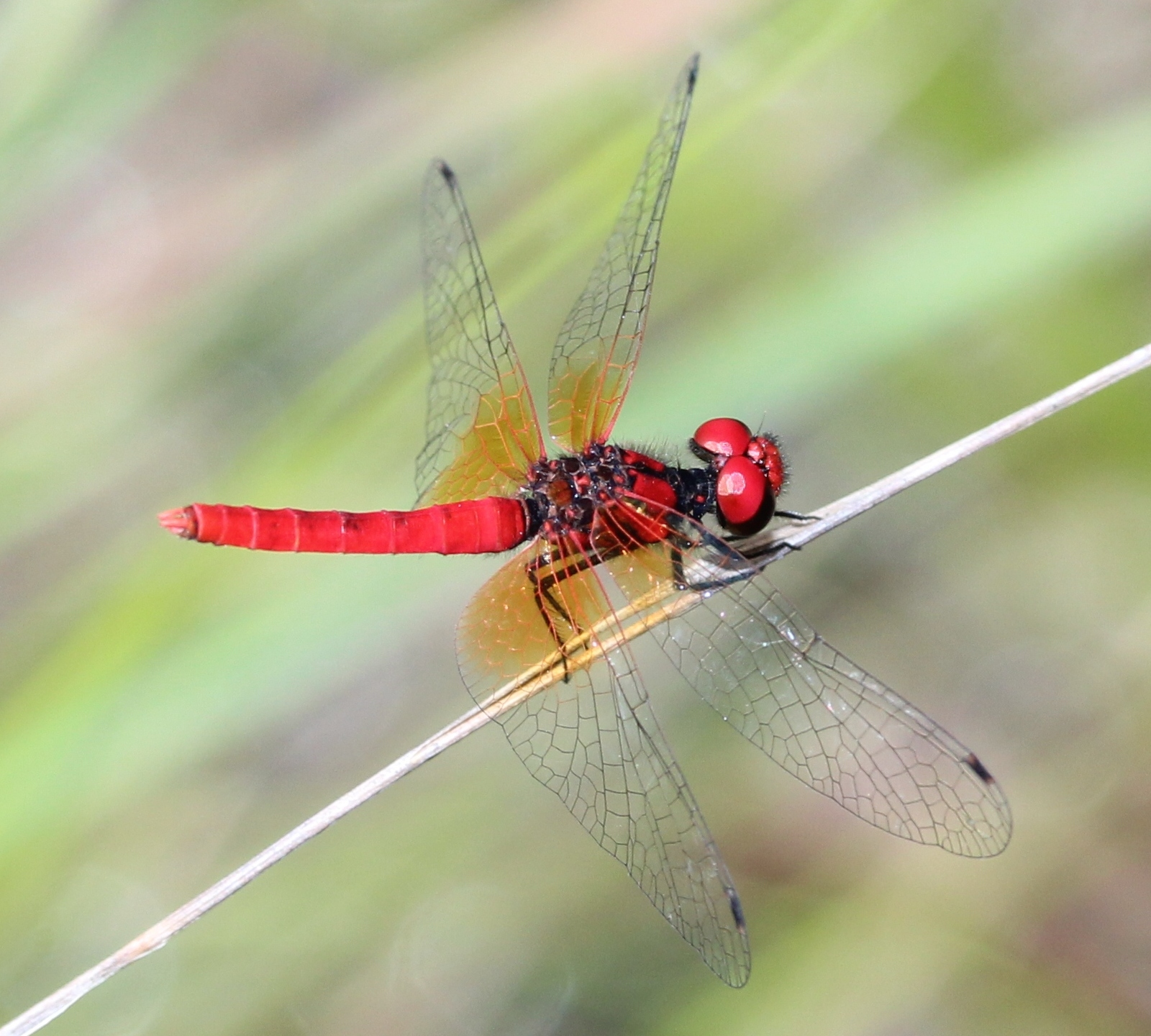
- Nannophya pygmaea

Scientific classification
- Kingdom: Animalia
- Phylum: Arthropoda
- Clade: Pancrustacea
- Class: Insecta
- Order: Odonata
- Infraorder: Anisoptera
- Family: Libellulidae
- Subfamily: Brachydiplacinae
- Genus: Nannophya; Rambur, 1842

Synonyms
- Nannodythemis Brauer, 1868

= Nannophya =

Genus of dragonflies

Nannophya is a genus of dragonfly in the family Libellulidae. They are found in Asia and Australia. They are commonly known as Pygmyflies. Species of Nannophya are small to tiny dragonflies often brightly coloured. It includes Nannophya pygmaea, the scarlet dwarf, which is considered to be the world's smallest dragonfly.

== Etymology ==
The genus name Nannophya combines the Greek νάννος (nannos, "dwarf") with φυή (phyē, "form", "stature" or "growth"). The name refers to the small size of members of the genus. Other dragonfly genera later using the root -phya include Archaeophya, Austrophya, Cordulephya and Metaphya.

== Species ==
The genus Nannophya includes the following species:

Male	Female	Scientific name	Common name	Distribution
		Nannophya australis Brauer, 1865	Australian pygmyfly	eastern Australia
		Nannophya dalei (Tillyard, 1908)	Eastern Pygmyfly	south-eastern Australia
		Nannophya fenshami Theischinger, 2020	Artesian Pygmyfly	Central Queensland, Australia.
		Nannophya katrainensis Singh, 1955		Himalayas
		Nannophya occidentalis (Tillyard, 1908)	Western Pygmyfly	south-western Australia
		Nannophya paulsoni Theischinger, 2003	Scarlet Pygmyfly	northern Australia
		Nannophya pygmaea Rambur, 1842	Scarlet dwarf	Southeast Asia to China and Japan, south to Australia.
