= Komagane Station =

Railway station in Komagane, Nagano Prefecture, Japan

Komagane Station 駒ヶ根駅
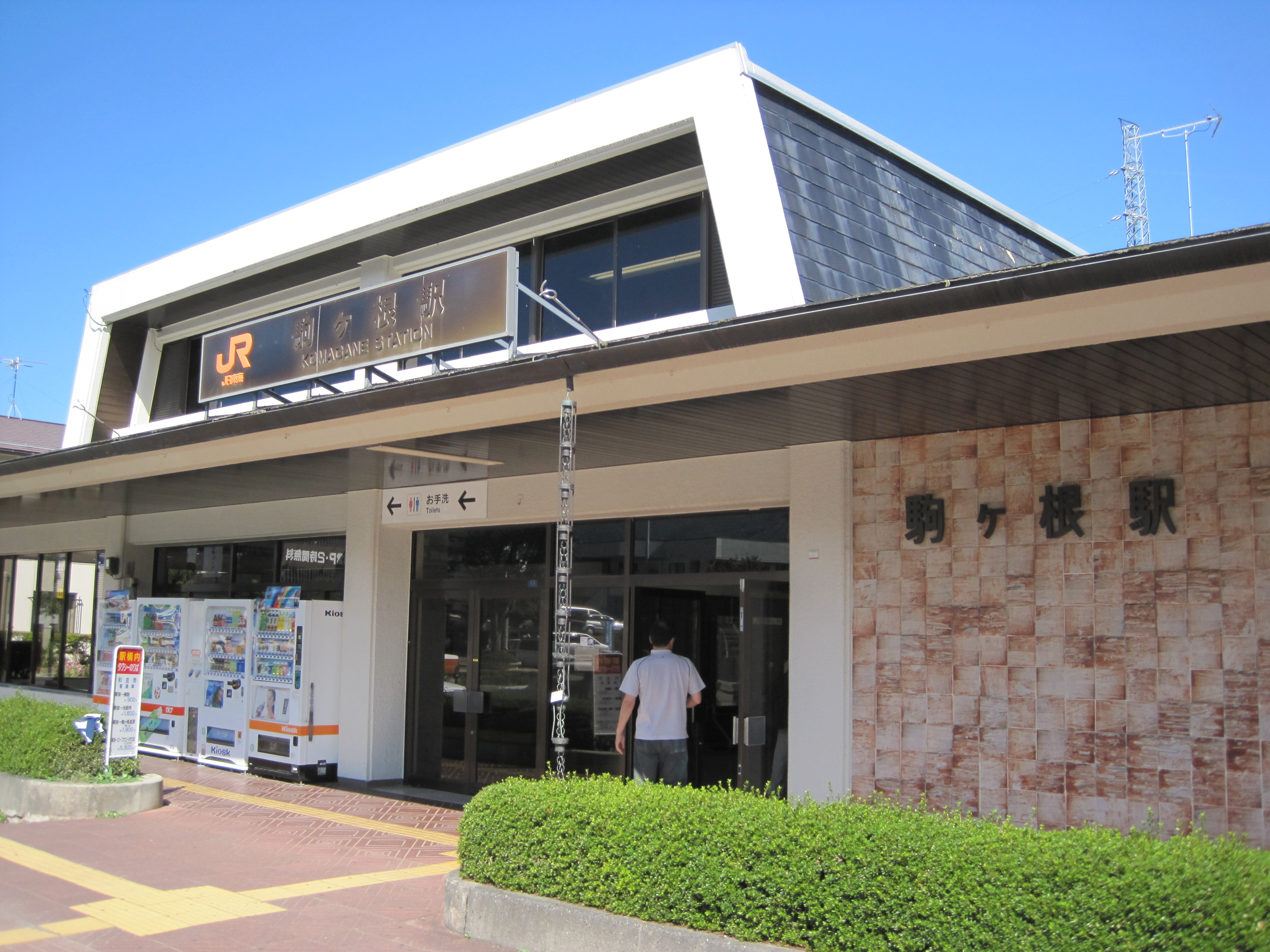
- Komagane Station in March 2011

General information
- Location: 1-1 Higashimachi, Komagane-shi, Nagano-ken 399-4106; Japan
- Coordinates: 35.7361°N 137.9370°E
- Elevation: 674 meters
- Operator: JR Central
- Line: Iida Line
- Distance: 165.6 km from Toyohashi
- Platforms: 1 side + 1 island platform

Other information
- Status: Staffed

History
- Opened: 31 October 1914
- Former names: Akaho Station (until 1959)

Passengers
- FY2017: 526 (daily)
Location
- Location within Nagano Prefecture Location within Japan

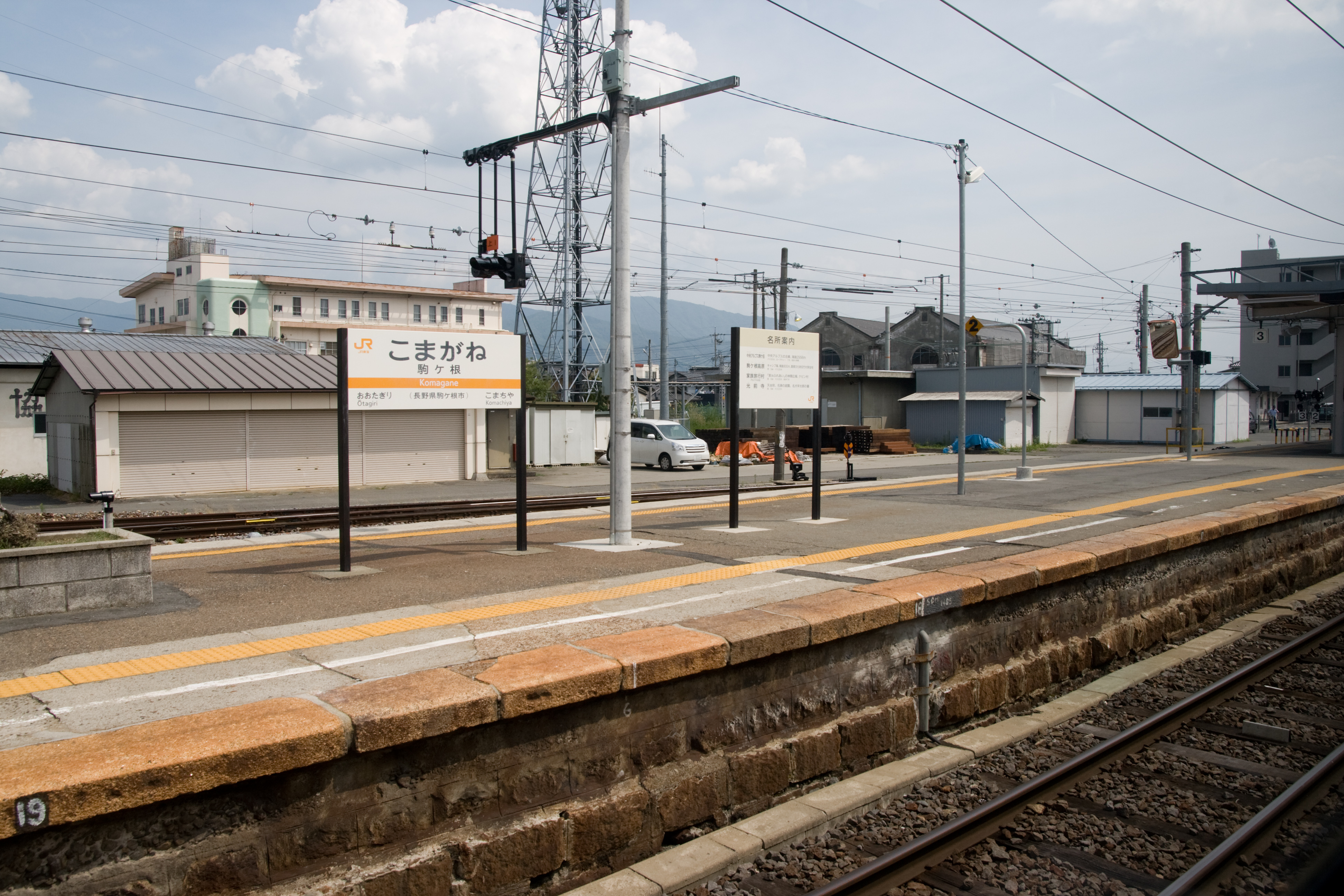
The station platforms

Komagane Station (駒ヶ根駅, Komagane-eki) is a railway station on the Iida Line in the city of Komagane, Nagano Prefecture, Japan, operated by Central Japan Railway Company (JR Central).

== Lines ==
Komagane Station is served by the Iida Line and is 165.6 kilometers from the starting point of the line at Toyohashi Station.

== Station layout ==
The station consists of one ground-level side platform and one island platform serving three tracks.

=== Platforms ===
1	■ Iida Line	for Tatsuno for Iida and Tenryūkyō
2	■ Iida Line	starting trains for Iida and Tenryūkyō
3	■ Iida Line	for Tatsuno

== Adjacent stations ==
«	Service	»
Iida Line
Ina-Fukuoka	Rapid Misuzu	Ōtagiri
Komachiya	Local	Ōtagiri

== History ==
The station opened on 31 October 1914 as Akaho Station (赤穂駅). It was renamed Komagane on 1 October 1959. The present station building was completed in 1980. With the privatization of Japanese National Railways (JNR) on 1 April 1987, the station came under the control of JR Central.

In fiscal 2015, the station was used by an average of 526 passengers daily (boarding passengers only).

== Surrounding area ==
- Komagatake Ropeway
- National Route 153

== See also ==
- List of railway stations in Japan
