= Inashi Station =

Railway station in Ina, Nagano Prefecture, Japan

Inashi Station 伊那市駅
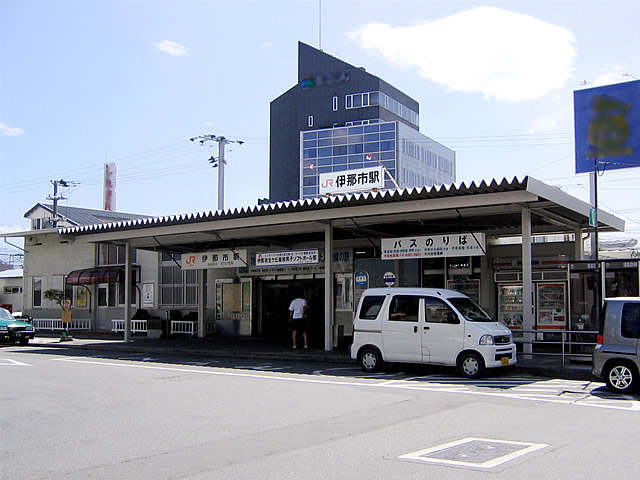
- Inashi Station in February 2006

General information
- Location: 3465 Arai, Ina-shi, Nagano-ken 396-0025; Japan
- Coordinates: 35.8382°N 137.9590°E
- Elevation: 640 meters
- Operator: JR Central
- Line: Iida Line
- Distance: 178.0 km from Toyohashi
- Platforms: 2 side platforms

Other information
- Status: Staffed
- Website: Official website

History
- Opened: 14 May 1912
- Former names: Inamachi (until 1954)

Passengers
- FY2015: 1,192 (daily)
Location
- Location within Nagano Prefecture Location within Japan

Inashi Station (伊那市駅, Inashi-eki) is a railway station on the Iida Line in the city of Ina, Nagano Prefecture, Japan, operated by Central Japan Railway Company (JR Central).

== Lines ==
Inashi Station is served by the Iida Line and is 178.0 kilometres (110.6 mi) from the starting point of the line at Toyohashi Station.

== Station layout ==
The station consists of two ground-level opposed side platforms connected by a footbridge. The station is staffed.

=== Platforms ===
1	■ Iida Line	for Tatsuno
2	■ Iida Line	for Iida and Tenryūkyō

== Adjacent stations ==
«	Service	»
Iida Line
Shimojima	Rapid Misuzu	Inakita
Shimojima	Local	Inakita

== History ==
The station opened on 14 May 1912 as Inamachi Station (伊那町駅). It was renamed Inashi on 10 November 1954 when Ina was elevated from town to city status. With the privatization of Japanese National Railways (JNR) on 1 April 1987, the station came under the control of JR Central.

== Passenger statistics ==
In fiscal 2015, the station was used by an average of 1192 passengers daily (boarding passengers only).

== Surrounding area ==
The station is located in the centre of the city of Ina, close by the city hall, banks and commercial centre.

== See also ==
- List of railway stations in Japan
