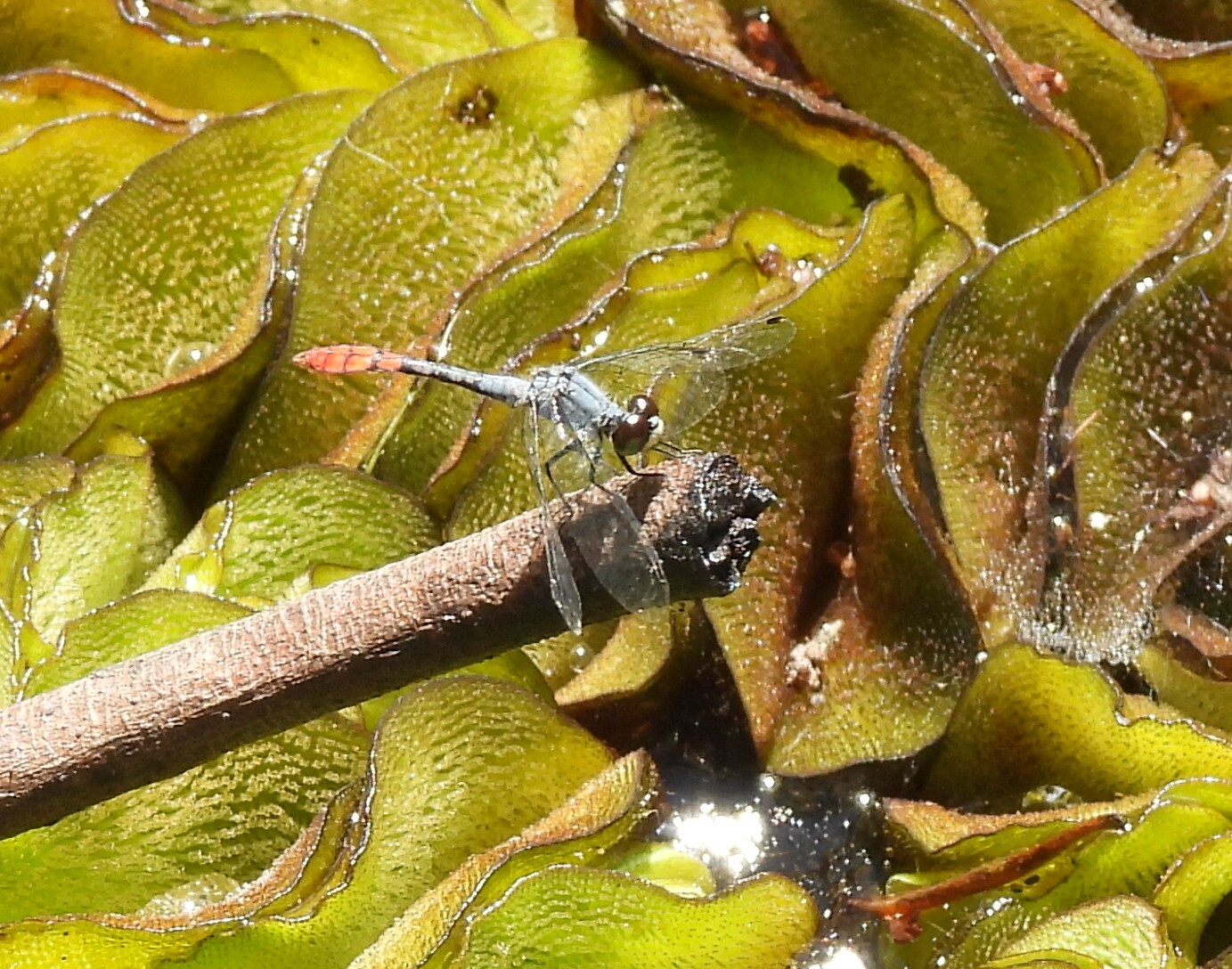
- Male
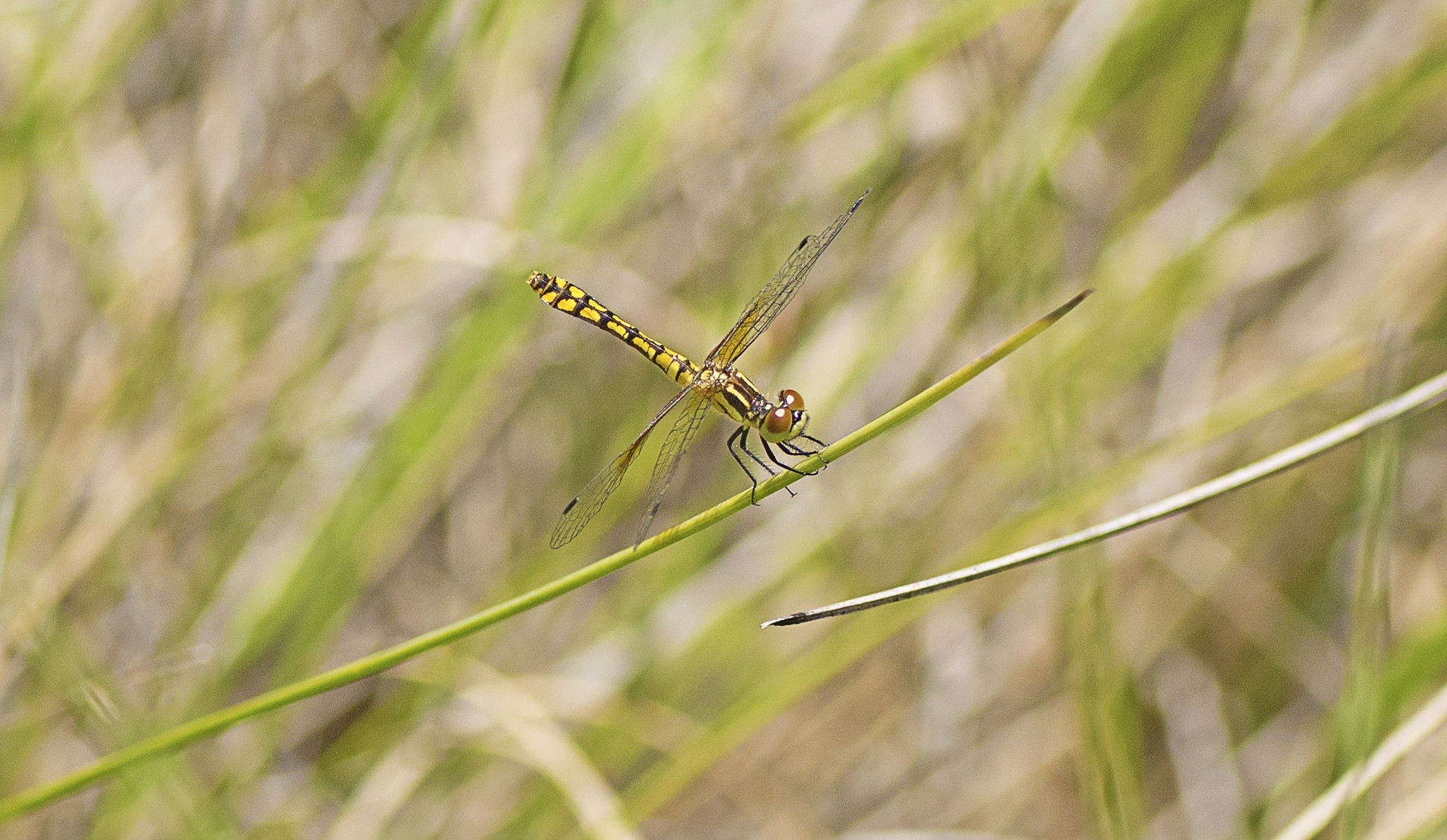
- Female

Conservation status
- Least Concern (IUCN 3.1)

Scientific classification
- Kingdom: Animalia
- Phylum: Arthropoda
- Clade: Pancrustacea
- Class: Insecta
- Order: Odonata
- Suborder: Anisoptera
- Superfamily: Libelluloidea
- Family: Libellulidae
- Genus: Nannophya
- Species: N. australis

Binomial name
- Nannophya australis Brauer, 1865

= Nannophya australis =

Australian pygmyfly

Species of dragonfly

Nannophya australis is a species of dragonfly of the family Libellulidae, known as the Australian pygmyfly. It inhabits boggy seepages and swamps in eastern Australia. It is a tiny dragonfly with black and red markings.

== Etymology ==
The genus name Nannophya combines the Greek νάννος (nannos, "dwarf") with φυή (phyē, "form", "stature" or "growth"). The name refers to the small size of members of the genus.

The species name australis is Latin for "southern", referring to Australia, where the original specimens of the species were collected.

== Gallery ==
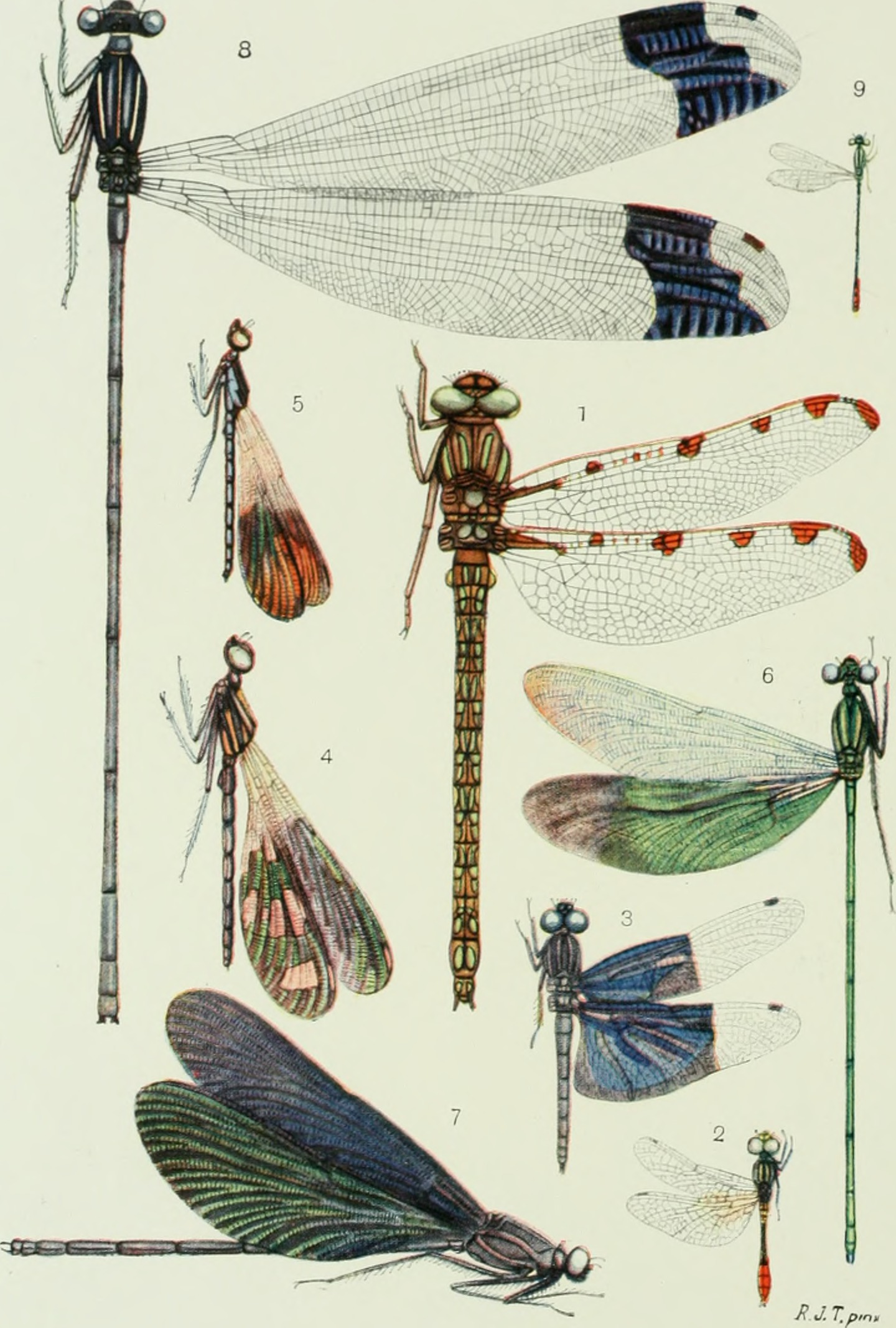
Figure 2. Male

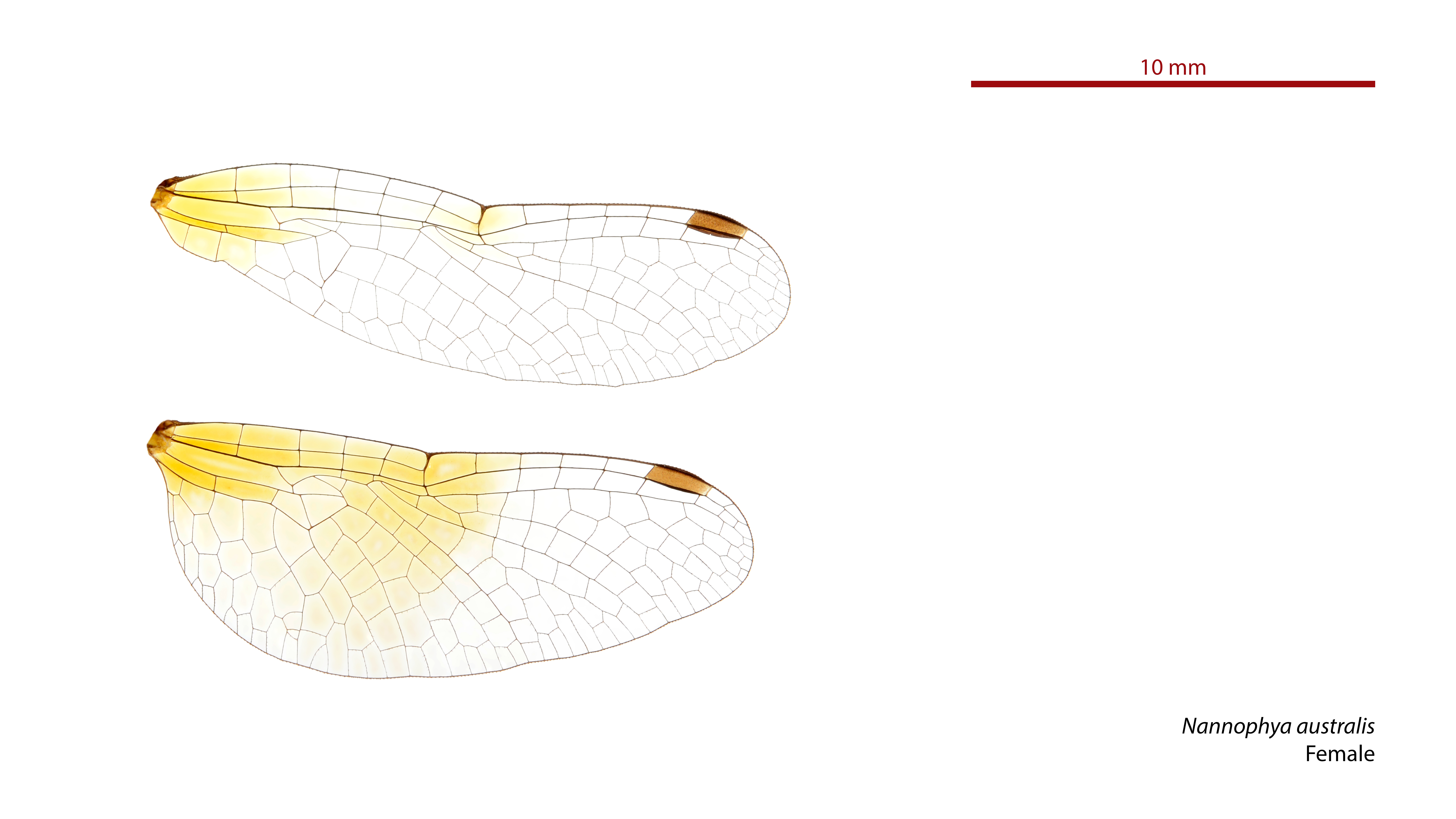
Female wings

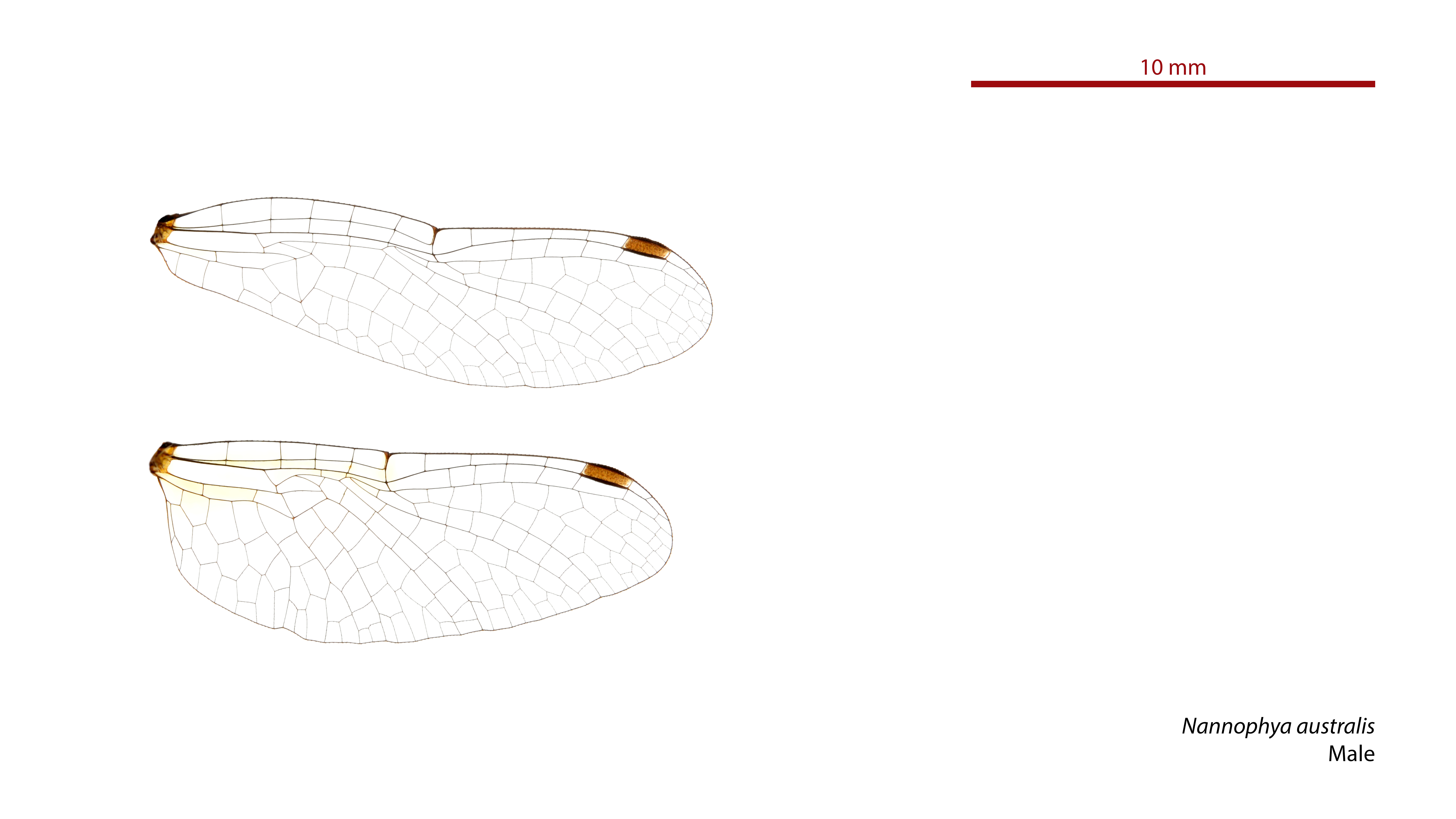
Male wings

== See also ==
- List of Odonata species of Australia
