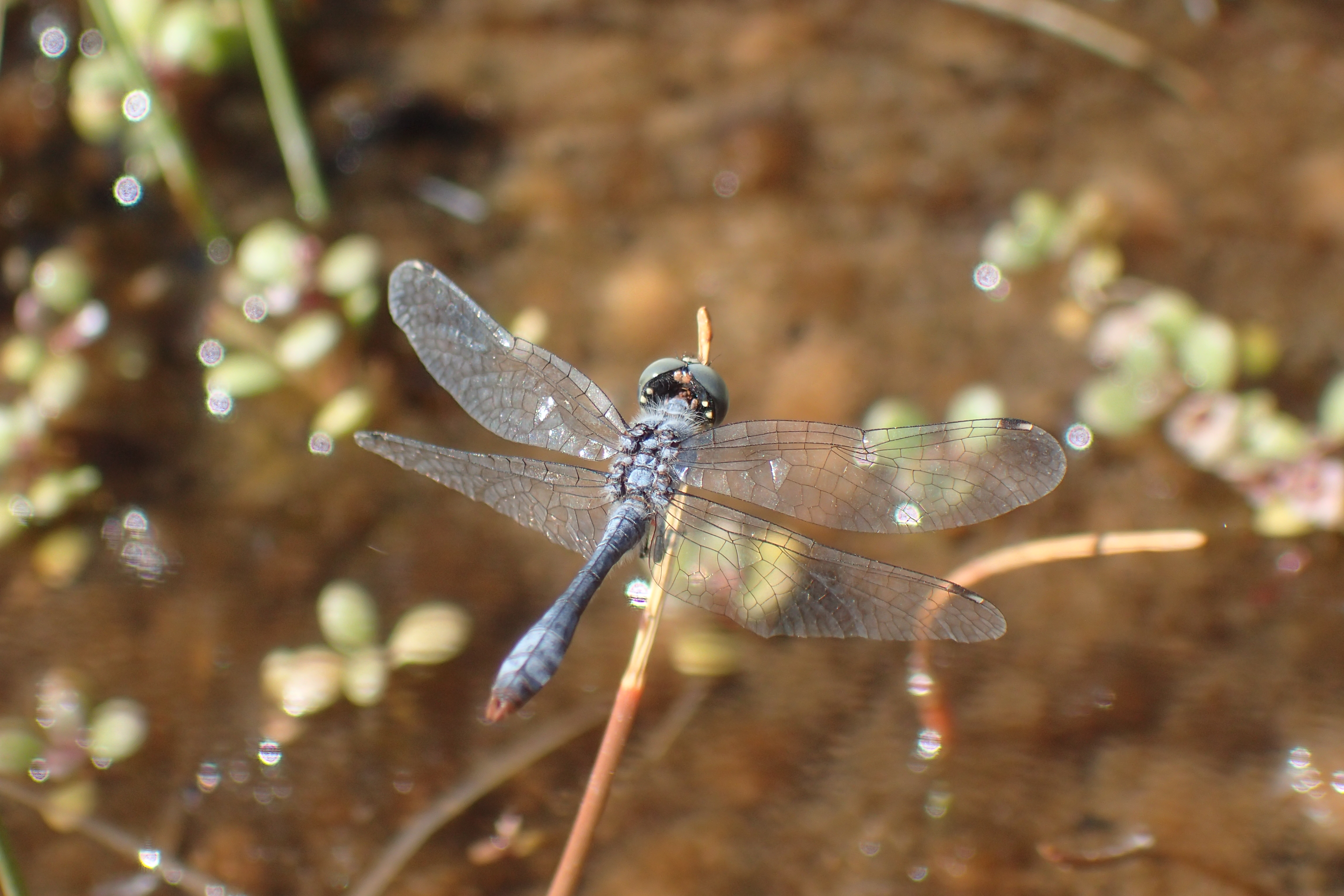
- Male artesian pygmyfly

Conservation status
- Least Concern (IUCN 3.1)

Scientific classification
- Kingdom: Animalia
- Phylum: Arthropoda
- Clade: Pancrustacea
- Class: Insecta
- Order: Odonata
- Suborder: Anisoptera
- Superfamily: Libelluloidea
- Family: Libellulidae
- Genus: Nannophya
- Species: N. fenshami

Binomial name
- Nannophya fenshami Theischinger, 2020

= Nannophya fenshami =

Artesian pygmyfly

Species of dragonfly

Nannophya fenshami is a species of dragonfly of the family Libellulidae, known as the artesian pygmyfly. It is a very small dragonfly with a wingspan less than 30 mm, that has been found living in an artesian spring wetland of the Barcaldine region of Central Queensland, Australia. Males are dark in colour and covered in a pale pruinescence with a red tip to their tail, while females are black with a distinctive yellow pattern.

== Etymology ==
The genus name Nannophya combines the Greek νάννος (nannos, "dwarf") with φυή (phyē, "form", "stature" or "growth"). The name refers to the small size of members of the genus.

In 2020, Günther Theischinger named this species fenshami, an eponym honouring Rod Fensham, a specialist in artesian spring wetlands.

== See also ==
- List of Odonata species of Australia
