= Miyada Station =

Railway station in Miyada, Nagano Prefecture, Japan

Miyada Station 宮田駅
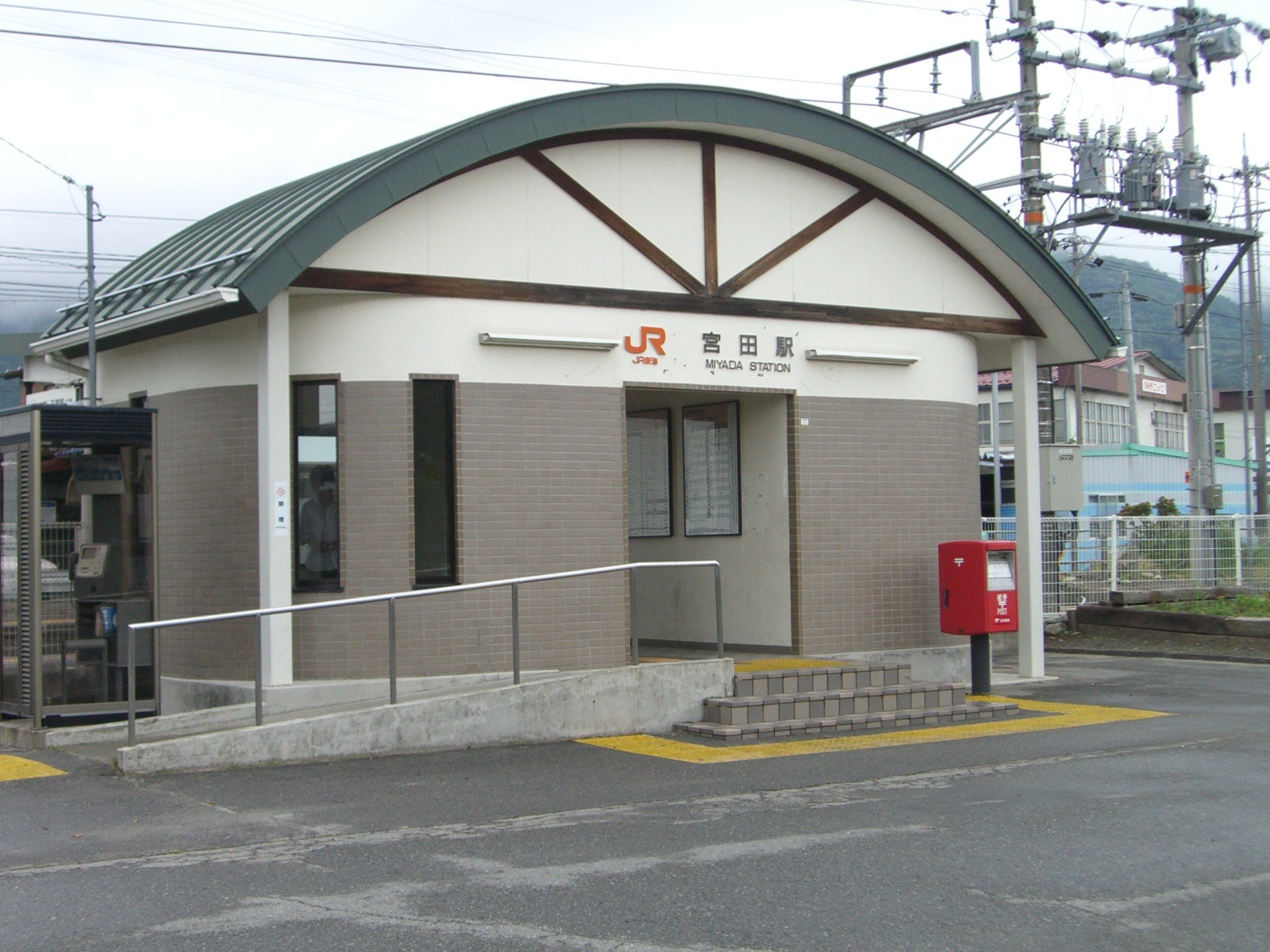
- Miyada Station in February 2006

General information
- Location: 3198 Miyada-mura, Kamiina-gun, Nagano-ken 399-4301; Japan
- Coordinates: 35.7673°N 137.9382°E
- Elevation: 648 m (2,126 ft)
- Operator: JR Central
- Line: Iida Line
- Distance: 169.1 km from Toyohashi
- Platforms: 2 side platforms

Other information
- Status: Unstaffed

History
- Opened: 27 December 1913
- Former names: Miyata Station (to 1956)

Passengers
- FY2016: 350 daily
Location
- Location within Nagano Prefecture Location within Japan

Miyada Station (宮田駅, Miyada-eki) is a railway station on the Iida Line in the village of Miyada, Kamiina District, Nagano Prefecture, Japan, operated by Central Japan Railway Company (JR Central).

== Lines ==
Miyada Station is served by the Iida Line and is 169.1 kilometers from the starting point of the line at Toyohashi Station.

== Station layout ==
The station consists of two ground-level opposed side platforms connected by a footbridge. The station is unattended.

=== Platforms ===
1	■ Iida Line	for Iida and Tenryūkyō
2	■ Iida Line	for Tatsuno

== Adjacent stations ==
«	Service	»
Iida Line
Ōtagiri	Rapid Misuzu	Akagi
Ōtagiri	Local	Akagi

== History ==
The station opened on 27 December 1913 as Miyata Station. It was renamed Miyada on 15 December 1956. With the privatization of Japanese National Railways (JNR) on 1 April 1987, the station came under the control of JR Central.

== Passenger statistics ==
In fiscal 2016, the station was used by an average of 350 passengers daily (boarding passengers only).

== Surrounding area ==
- Miyada Village Hall
- Miyada Elementary School
- Miyada Junior High School

== See also ==
- List of railway stations in Japan
