= Komachiya Station =

Railway station in Komagane, Nagano Prefecture, Japan

Komachiya Station 小町屋駅
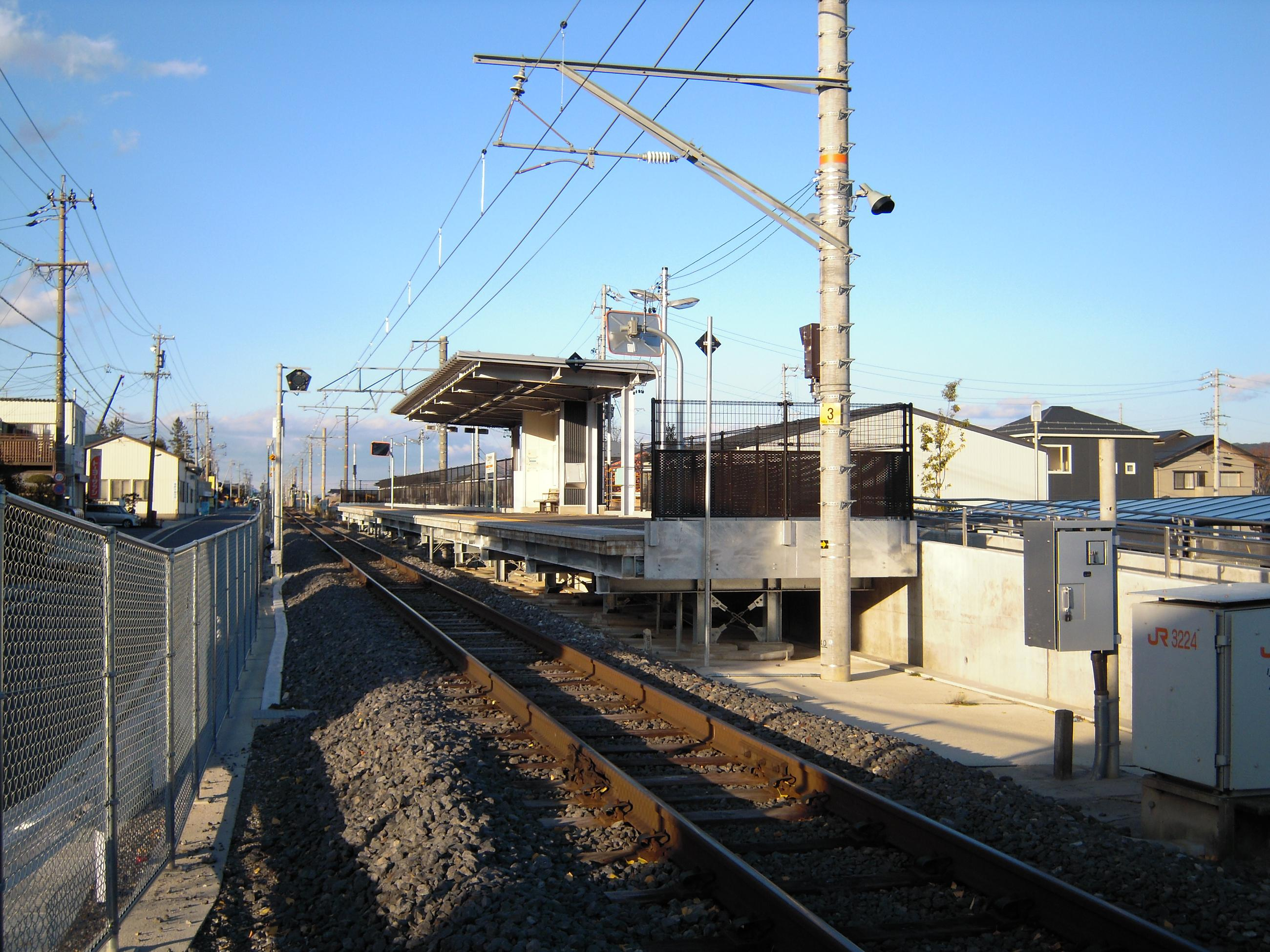
- Komachiya Station in November 2009

General information
- Location: Akaho-Komachiya, Komagane-shi, Nagano-ken 399-4100; Japan
- Coordinates: 35.7267°N 137.9351°E
- Elevation: 672 meters
- Operator: JR Central
- Line: Iida Line
- Distance: 164.4 km from Toyohashi
- Platforms: 1 side platform

Other information
- Status: Unstaffed

History
- Opened: 26 December 1914

Passengers
- FY2017: 706 (daily)
Location
- Location within Nagano Prefecture Location within Japan

Komachiya Station (小町屋駅, Komachiya-eki) is a railway station on the Iida Line in the city of Komagane, Nagano Prefecture, Japan, operated by Central Japan Railway Company (JR Central).

== Lines ==
Komachiya Station is served by the Iida Line and is 164.4 kilometers from the starting point of the line at Toyohashi Station.

== Station layout ==
The station consists of one ground-level side platform serving one bi-directional track. There is no station building, but only a shelter built on the platform. The station is unattended.

== Adjacent stations ==
«	Service	»
Iida Line
Rapid Misuzu: Does not stop at this station
Ina-Fukuoka	Local	Komagane

== History ==
Komachiya Station opened on 26 December 1914. With the privatization of Japanese National Railways (JNR) on 1 April 1987, the station came under the control of JR Central.

== Passenger statistics ==
In fiscal 2015, the station was used by an average of 706 passengers daily (boarding passengers only).

== Surrounding area ==
- Komagane City Hall
- Akaho Elementary School
- Akaho Junior High School

== See also ==
- List of railway stations in Japan
