= Sawando Station =

Railway station in Ina, Nagano Prefecture, Japan

Sawando Station 沢渡駅
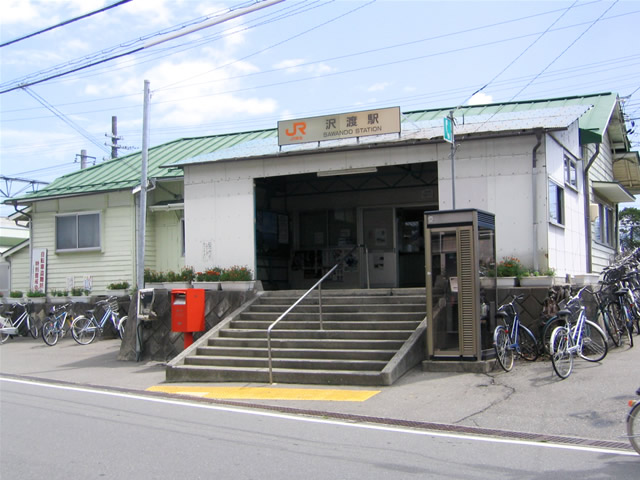
- Sawando Station in August 2005

General information
- Location: 5204 Nishi-Haruchika-Sawando, Ina-shi, Nagano-ken 399-443; Japan
- Coordinates: 35.8038°N 137.9435°E
- Elevation: 614 meters
- Operator: JR Central
- Line: Iida Line
- Distance: 173.4 km from Toyohashi
- Platforms: 2 side platforms

Other information
- Status: Unstaffed

History
- Opened: 27 December 1913

Passengers
- FY2015: 542 (daily)
Location
- Location within Nagano Prefecture Location within Japan

Sawando Station (沢渡駅, Sawando-eki) is a railway station on the Iida Line in the city of Ina, Nagano Prefecture, Japan, operated by Central Japan Railway Company (JR Central).

== Lines ==
Sawando Station is served by the Iida Line and is 173.4 kilometers from the starting point of the line at Toyohashi Station.

== Station layout ==
The station consists of two opposed ground-level side platforms. The station is unattended.

== Adjacent stations ==
«	Service	»
Iida Line
Akagi	Rapid Misuzu	Shimojima
Akagi	Local	Shimojima

== History ==
Sawando Station opened on 27 December 1913. With the privatization of Japanese National Railways (JNR) on 1 April 1987, the station came under the control of JR Central.

== Passenger statistics ==
In fiscal 2015, the station was used by an average of 542 passengers daily (boarding passengers only).

== Surrounding area ==
- National Route 153

== See also ==
- List of railway stations in Japan
