= Akagi Station (Nagano) =

Railway station in Ina, Nagano Prefecture, Japan

Akagi Station 赤木駅
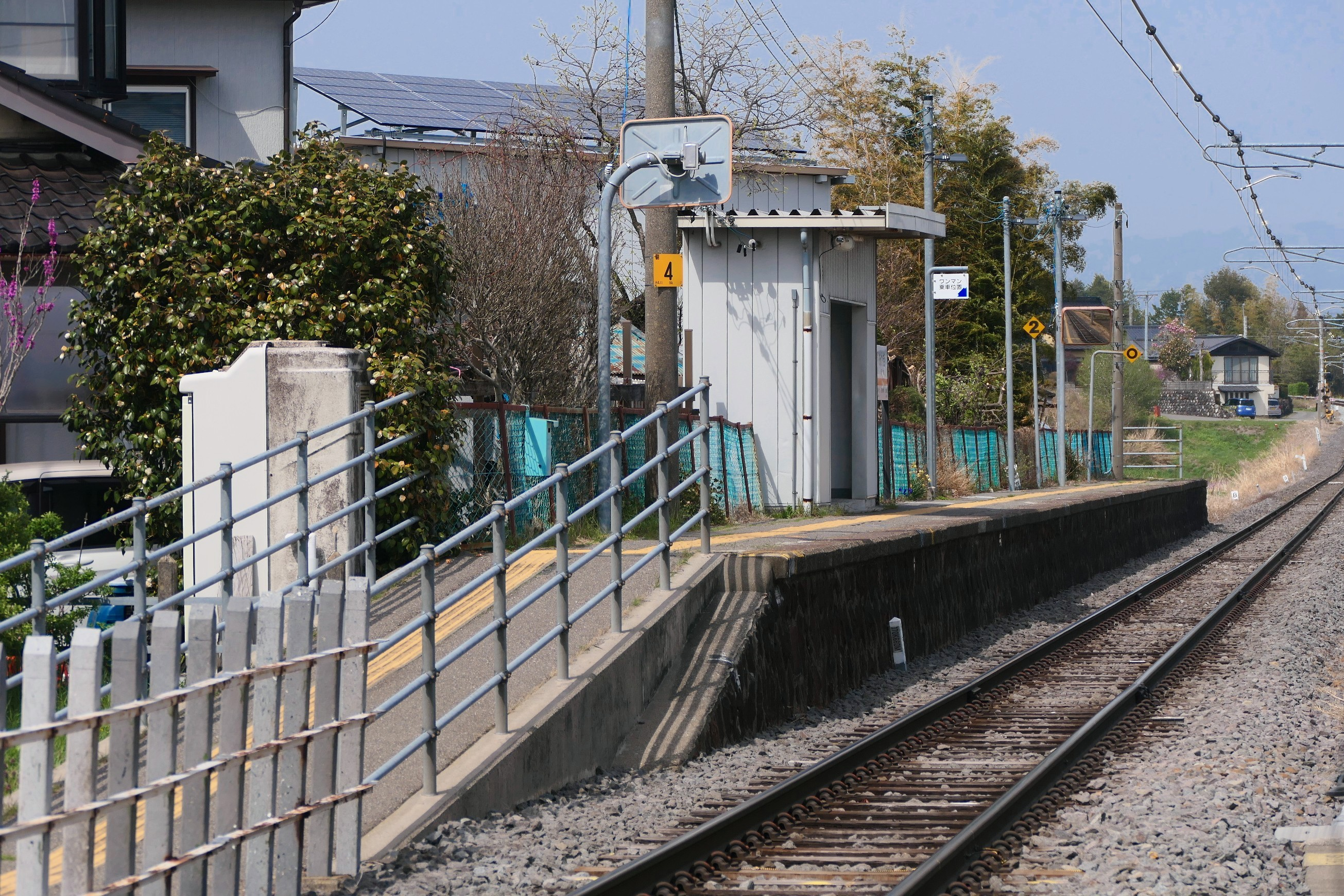
- Akagi Station in April 2025

General information
- Location: Nishi-Haruchika-Akagi, Ina-shi, Nagano-ken 399-443; Japan
- Coordinates: 35.7773°N 137.9439°E
- Elevation: 637 meters
- Operator: JR Central
- Line: Iida Line
- Distance: 170.4 km from Toyohashi
- Platforms: 1 side platform

History
- Opened: 27 December 1913

Passengers
- FY2015: 60 (daily)

Services
Preceding station	JR Central	Following station
Miyada towards Toyohashi	Iida Line Misuzu Local	Sawando towards Okaya
Location
- Location within Nagano Prefecture Location within Japan

Akagi Station (赤木駅, Akagi-eki) is a railway station on the Iida Line in the city of Ina, Nagano Prefecture, Japan, operated by Central Japan Railway Company (JR Central).

== Lines ==
Akagi Station is served by the Iida Line and is 170.4 kilometers from the starting point of the line at Toyohashi Station.

== Station layout ==
The station consists of one ground-level side platform serving a single bi-directional track. There is no station building, but only a shelter on the platform. The station is unattended.

== History ==
Akagi Station opened on 27 December 1913. With the privatization of Japanese National Railways (JNR) on 1 April 1987, the station came under the control of JR Central. The station building was rebuilt in 1990.

== Passenger statistics ==
In fiscal 2015, the station was used by an average of 60 passengers daily (boarding passengers only).

== Surrounding area ==
- National Route 153

== See also ==
- List of railway stations in Japan
