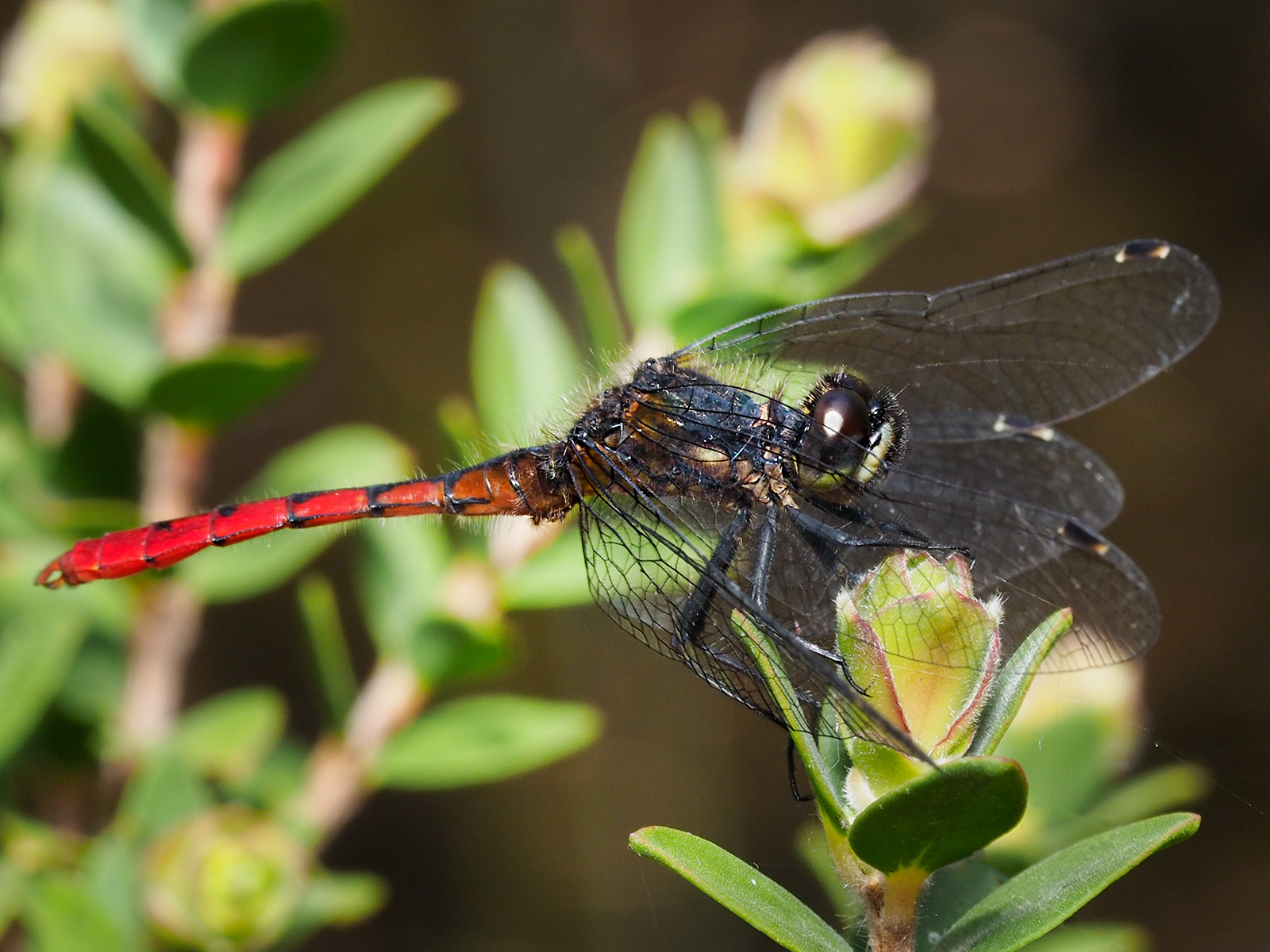
- Male

Conservation status
- Least Concern (IUCN 3.1)

Scientific classification
- Kingdom: Animalia
- Phylum: Arthropoda
- Clade: Pancrustacea
- Class: Insecta
- Order: Odonata
- Suborder: Anisoptera
- Superfamily: Libelluloidea
- Family: Libellulidae
- Genus: Nannophya
- Species: N. dalei

Binomial name
- Nannophya dalei (Tillyard, 1908)

Synonyms
- Nannodythemis dalei Tillyard, 1908

= Nannophya dalei =

Eastern pygmyfly

Species of dragonfly

Nannophya dalei is a species of dragonfly of the family Libellulidae, known as the eastern pygmyfly. It inhabits boggy seepages and swamps in south-eastern Australia. It is a small dragonfly with black and red markings.

== Etymology ==
The genus name Nannophya combines the Greek νάννος (nannos, "dwarf") with φυή (phyē, "form", "stature" or "growth"). The name refers to the small size of members of the genus.

In 1908, Robin Tillyard named this species dalei, an eponym honouring the British entomologist and friend of Sélys, the late James Charles Dale (1792–1872).

== Gallery ==
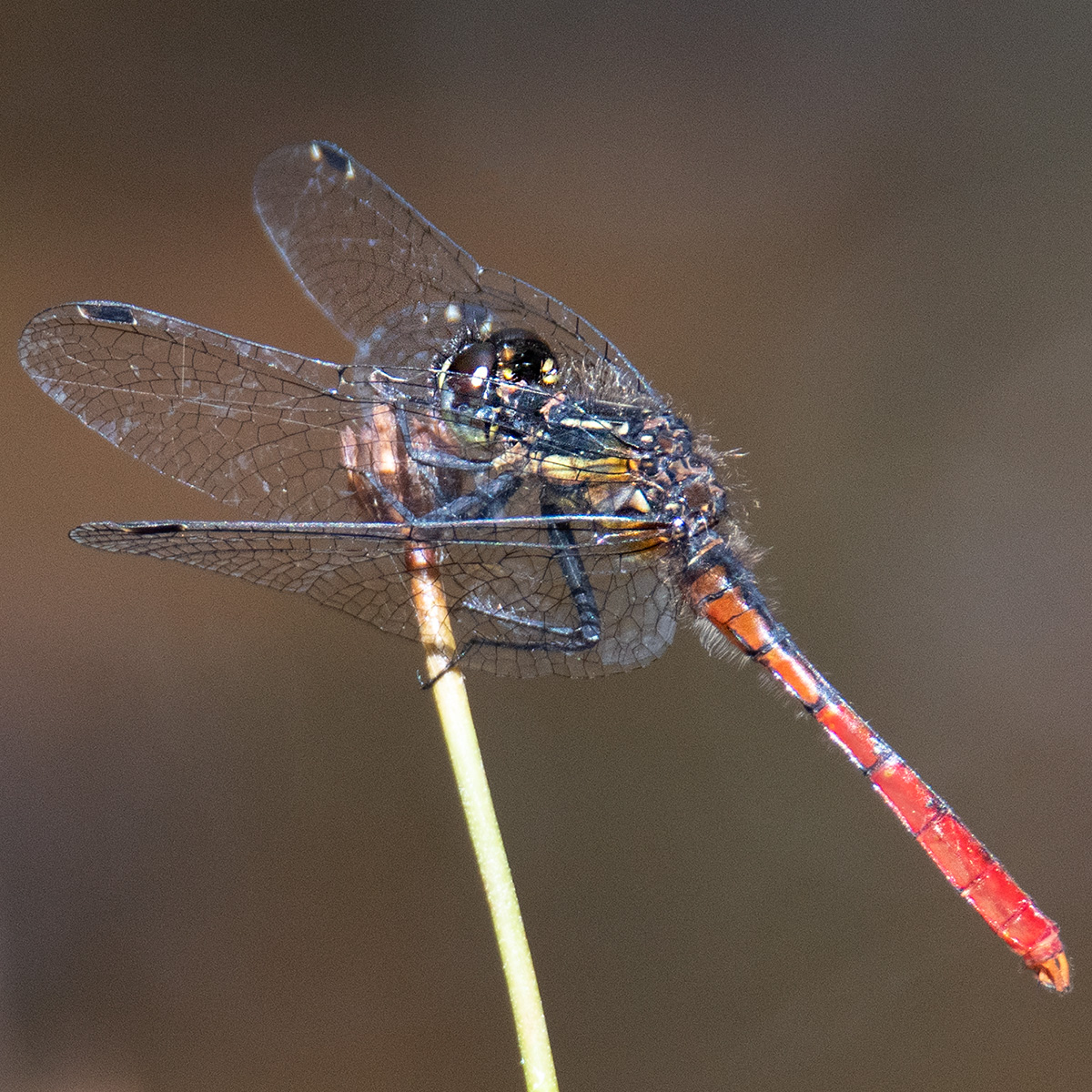
Male

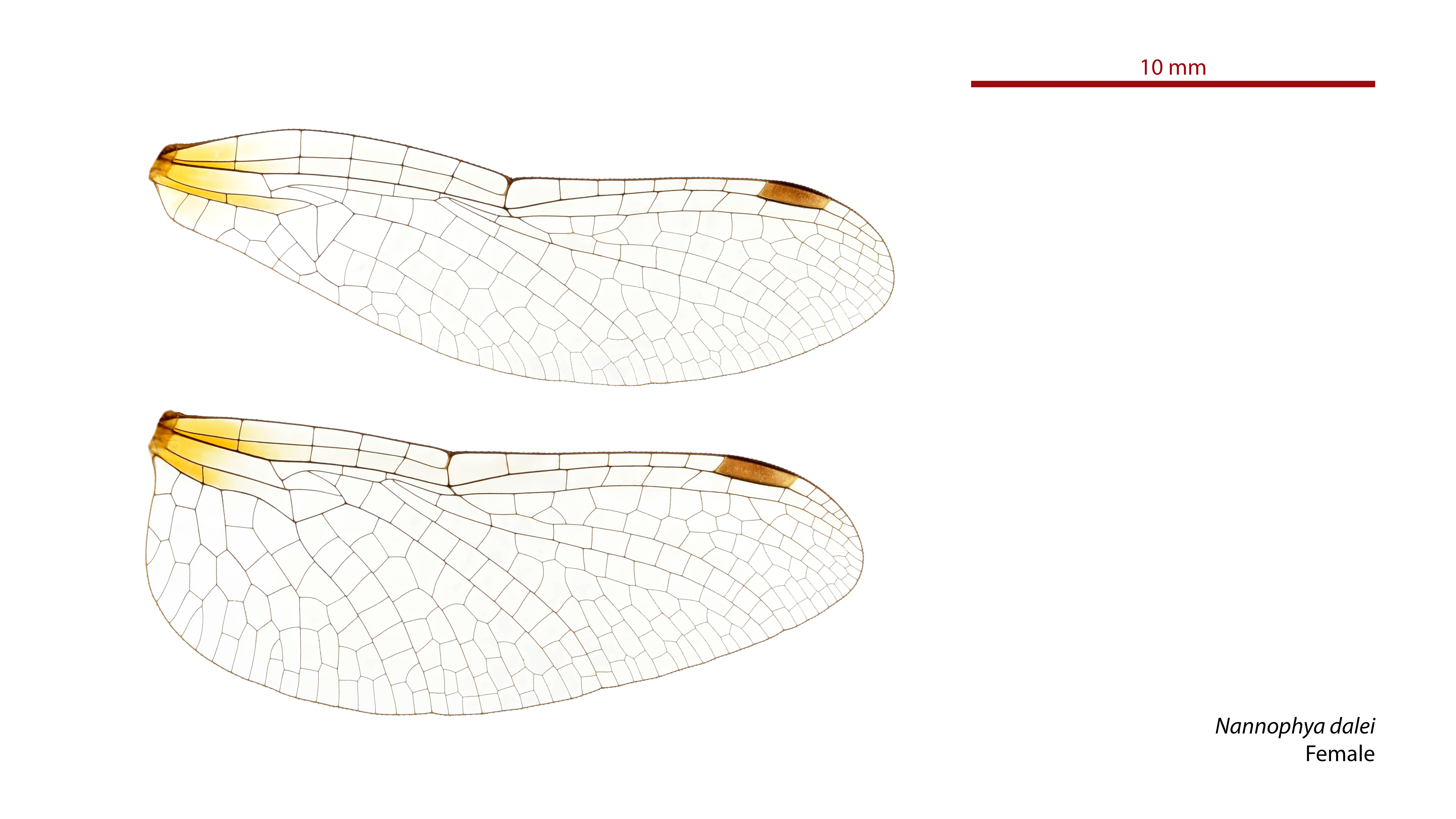
Female wings

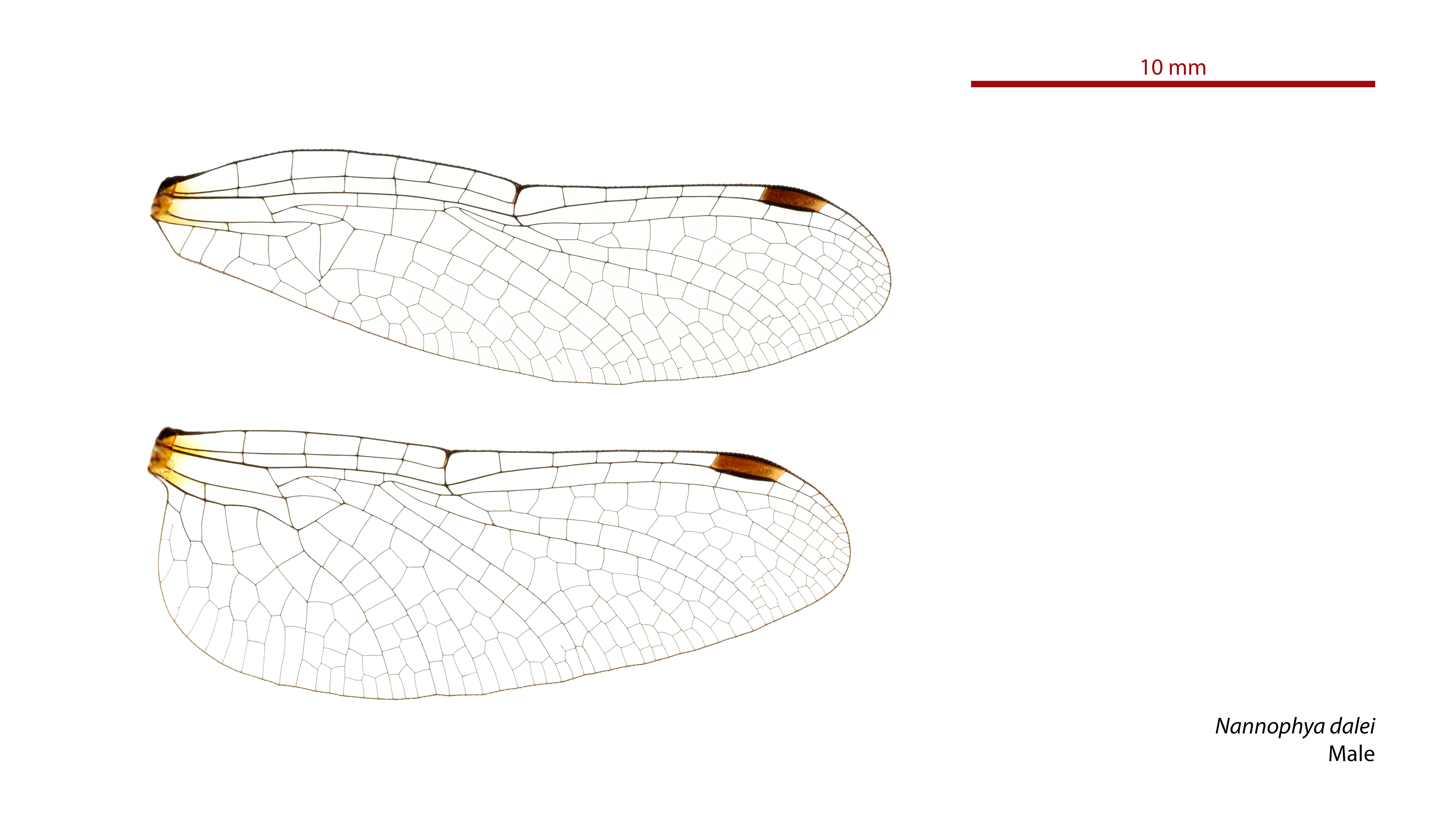
Male wings

== See also ==
- List of Odonata species of Australia
