= Shimojima Station (Ina) =

Railway station in Ina, Nagano Prefecture, Japan

Shimojima Station 下島駅
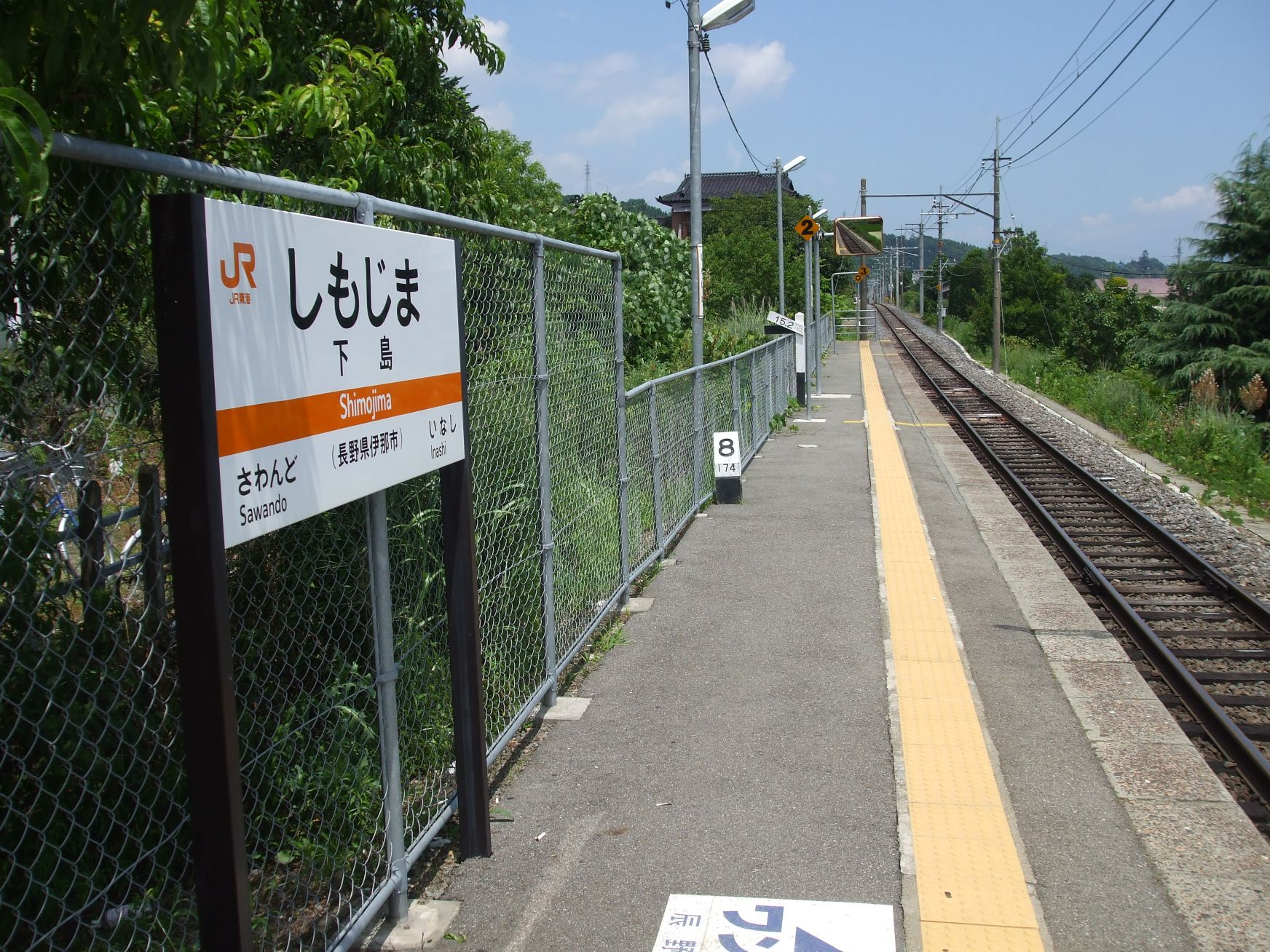
- Shimojima Station platform in July 2008

General information
- Location: Nishi-Haruchika-Kodejima, Ina-shi, Nagano-ken; Japan
- Coordinates: 35°48′46″N 137°56′24″E
- Elevation: 623 meters
- Operator: JR Central
- Line: Iida Line
- Distance: 174.5 km from Toyohashi
- Platforms: 1 side platform

Other information
- Status: Unstaffed

History
- Opened: 27 December 1913

Passengers
- FY2015: 63 (daily)
Location
- Location within Nagano Prefecture Location within Japan

Shimojima Station (下島駅, Shimojima-eki) is a railway station on the Iida Line in the city of Ina, Nagano Prefecture, Japan, operated by Central Japan Railway Company (JR Central).

== Lines ==
Shimojima Station is served by the Iida Line and is 174.5 kilometers from the starting point of the line at Toyohashi Station.

== Station layout ==
The station consists of one ground-level side platform serving a single bi-directional track. There is no station building, but only a shelter on the platform. The station is unattended.

== Adjacent stations ==
«	Service	»
Iida Line
Sawando	Rapid Misuzu	Inashi
Sawando	Local	Inashi

== History ==
Shimojima Station opened on 27 December 1913. With the privatization of Japanese National Railways (JNR) on 1 April 1987, the station came under the control of JR Central.

== Passenger statistics ==
In fiscal 2015, the station was used by an average of 63 passengers daily (boarding passengers only).

== Surrounding area ==
- National Route 153
- Tenryū River

== See also ==
- List of railway stations in Japan
