= Ina-Fukuoka Station =

Railway station in Komagane, Nagano Prefecture, Japan

Ina-Fukuoka Station 伊那福岡駅
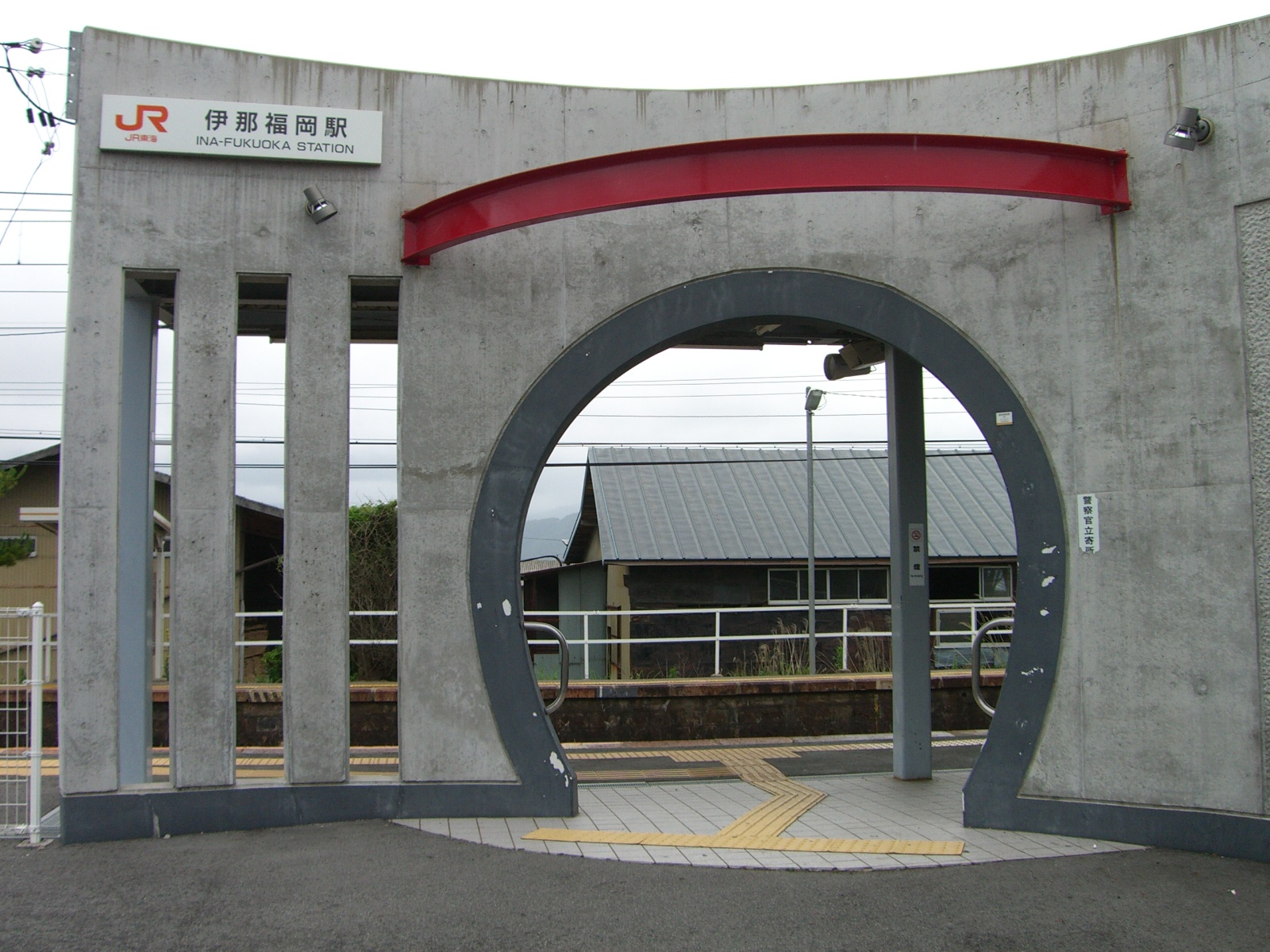
- Ina-Fukuoka Station in July 2008

General information
- Location: Akaho-Fukuoka, Komagane-shi, Nagano-ken 399-4117; Japan
- Coordinates: 35.7119°N 137.9340°E
- Elevation: 663 meters
- Operator: JR Central
- Line: Iida Line
- Distance: 162.9 km from Toyohashi
- Platforms: 2 side platforms

Other information
- Status: Unstaffed

History
- Opened: 16 December 1914

Passengers
- FY2017: 326 (daily)
Location
- Location within Nagano Prefecture Location within Japan

Ina-Fukuoka Station (伊那福岡駅, Ina-Fukuoka-eki) is a railway station on the Iida Line in the city of Komagane, Nagano Prefecture, Japan, operated by Central Japan Railway Company (JR Central).

== Lines ==
Ina-Fukuoka Station is served by the Iida Line and is 162.9 kilometers from the starting point of the line at Toyohashi Station.

== Station layout ==
The station consists of two ground-level opposed side platforms. There is no station building, but only a shelter built on the platform. The station is unattended.

=== Platforms ===
1	■ Iida Line	for Tatsuno
2	■ Iida Line	for Iida and Tenryūkyō

== Adjacent stations ==
«	Service	»
Iida Line
Iijima	Rapid Misuzu	Komagane
Tagiri	Local	Komachiya

== History ==
Ina-Fukuoka Station opened on 16 December 1914. With the privatization of Japanese National Railways (JNR) on 1 April 1987, the station came under the control of JR Central.

== Passenger statistics ==
In fiscal 2015, the station was used by an average of 326 passengers daily (boarding passengers only).

== Surrounding area ==
- National Route 153
- Komagame Technical High School

== See also ==
- List of railway stations in Japan
