= Nagano College of Nursing =

Coordinates: 35°44′45″N 137°56′00″E

- 長野県看護大学
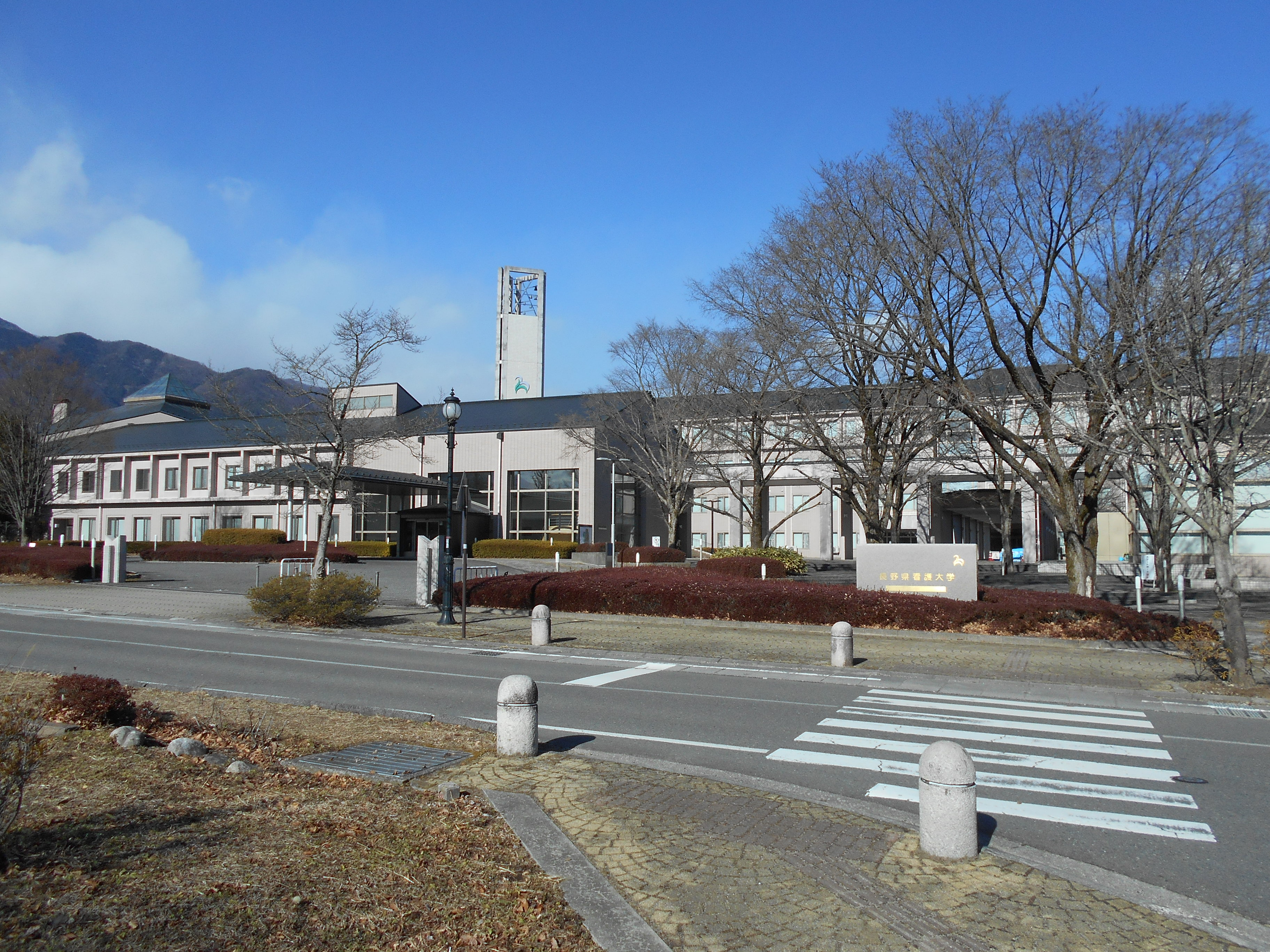
- Nagano College of Nursing
- Type: Public
- Established: 1995
- Location: Komagane, Nagano, Japan
- Website: Official website

Nagano College of Nursing (長野県看護大学, Nagano-ken kango daigaku) is a public university in Komagane, Nagano, Japan. The school was established in 1995.
