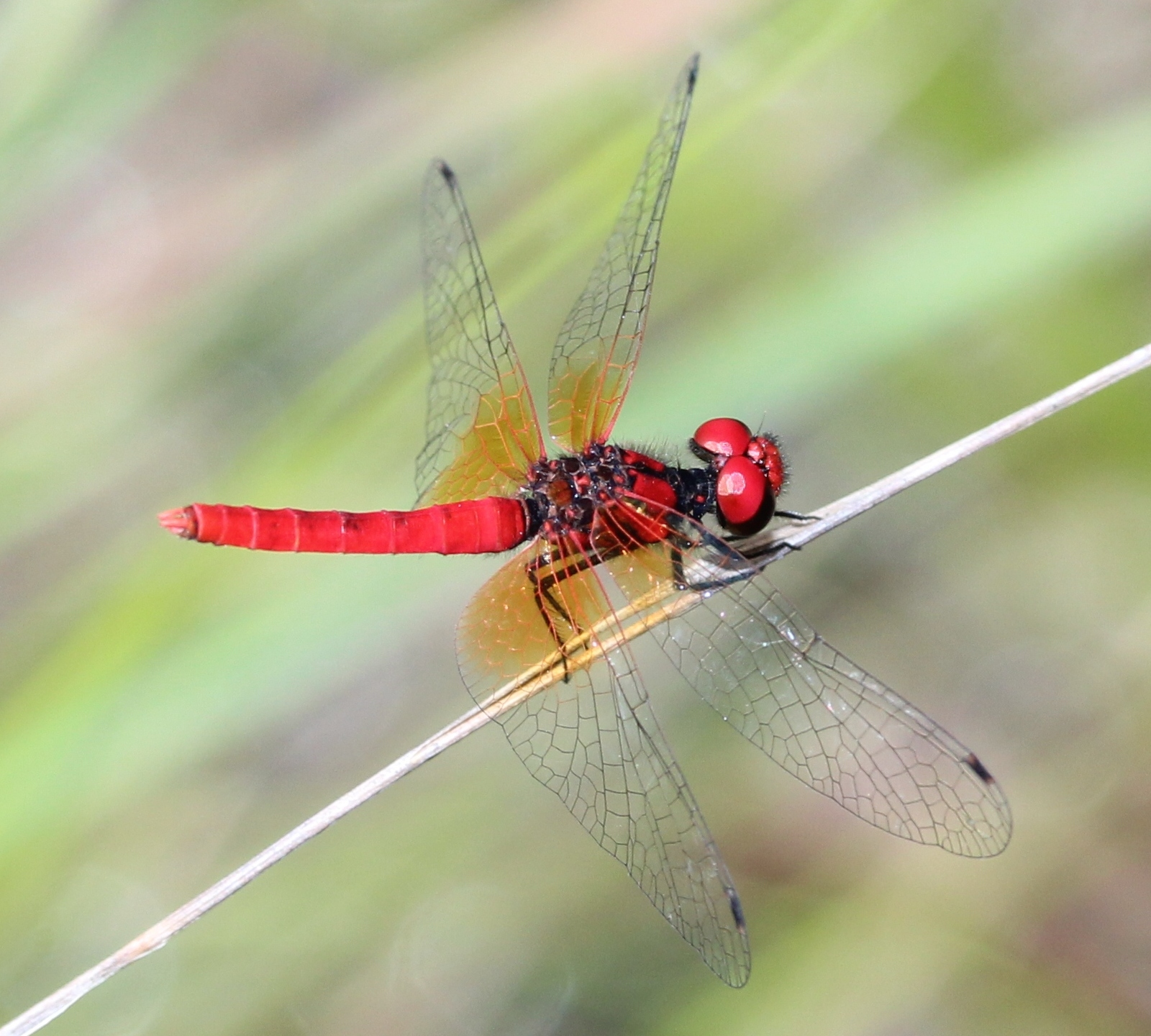
- Scarlet dwarf (male)

Conservation status
- Least Concern (IUCN 3.1)

Scientific classification
- Kingdom: Animalia
- Phylum: Arthropoda
- Clade: Pancrustacea
- Class: Insecta
- Order: Odonata
- Infraorder: Anisoptera
- Family: Libellulidae
- Genus: Nannophya
- Species: N. pygmaea

Binomial name
- Nannophya pygmaea Rambur, 1842

= Scarlet dwarf =

Species of dragonfly

Nannophya pygmaea, known variously as the scarlet dwarf, northern pygmyfly, or tiny dragonfly, is a dragonfly of the family Libellulidae, native from Southeast Asia to China and Japan, occasionally found south to Australia.

== Description ==
This species has the distinction of being the smallest of the dragonflies, with a wingspan of only 20 mm (0.79 in).
