= List of cities in Nagano Prefecture by population =

The following list sorts all cities (including towns and villages) in the Japanese prefecture of Nagano with a population of more than 10,000 according to the 2020 Census. As of October 1, 2020, 34 places fulfill this criterion and are listed here. This list refers only to the population of individual cities, towns and villages within their defined limits, which does not include other municipalities or suburban areas within urban agglomerations.

== List ==
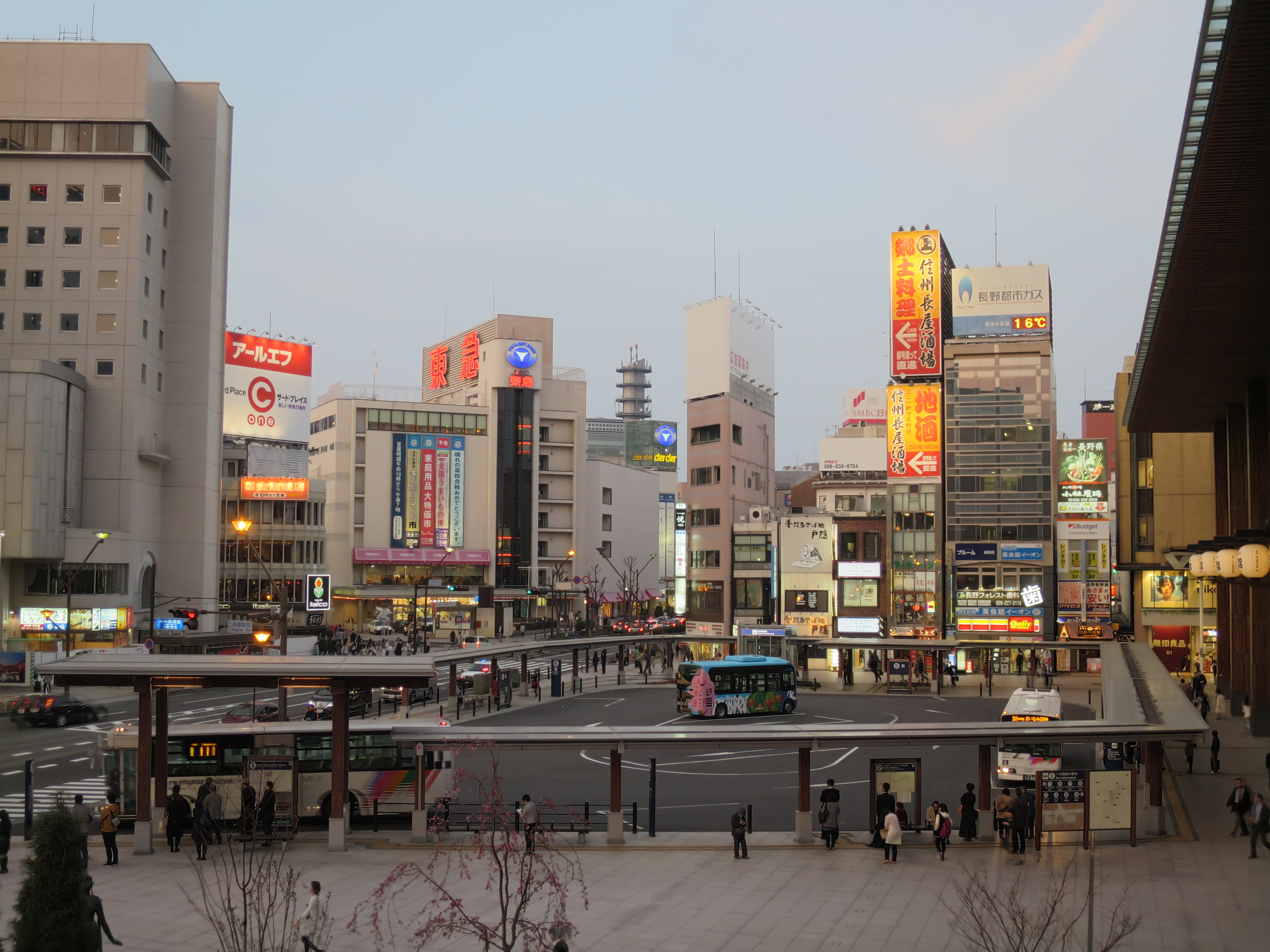
01.Nagano

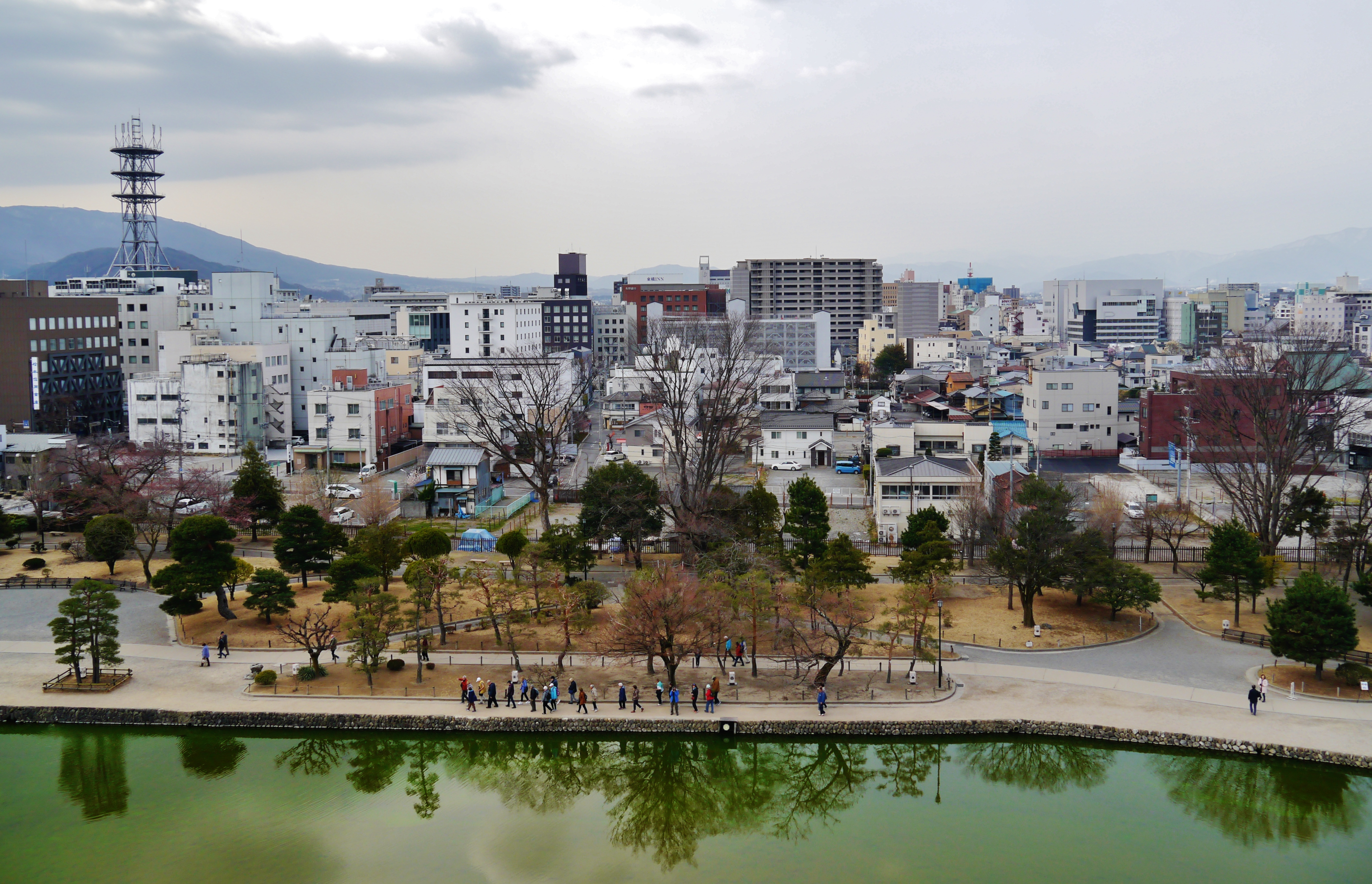
02.Matsumoto

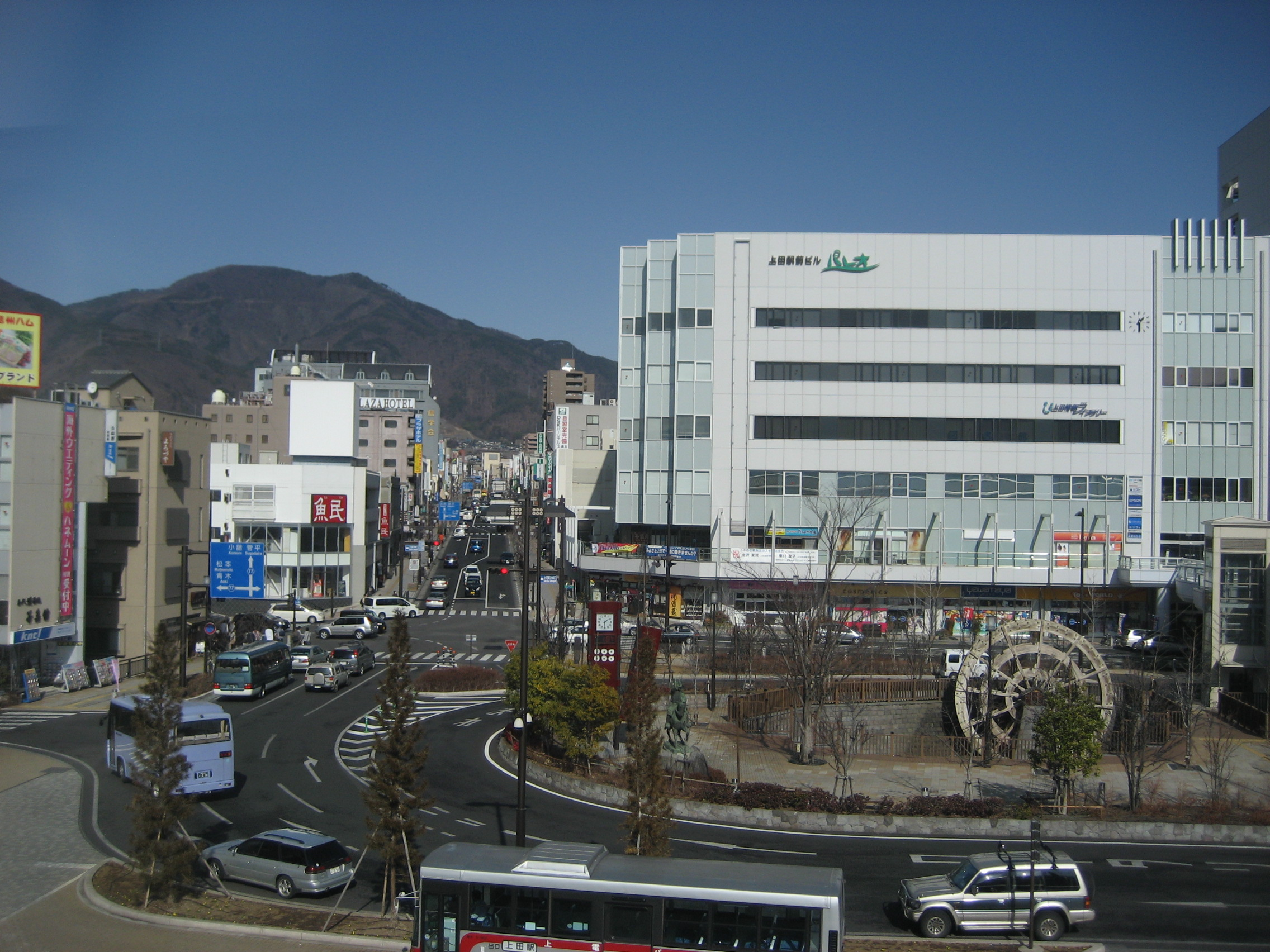
03.Ueda

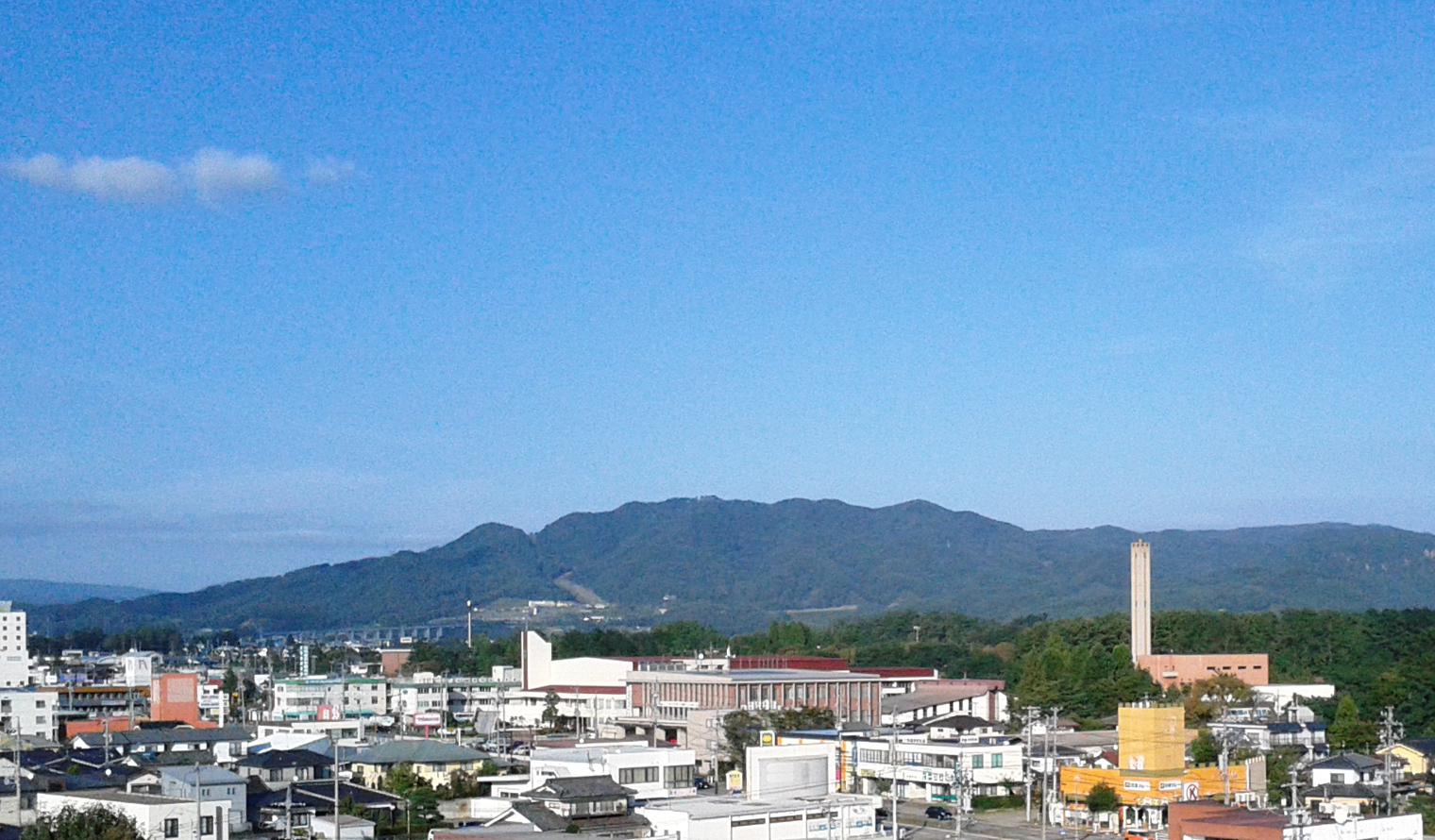
04.Saku

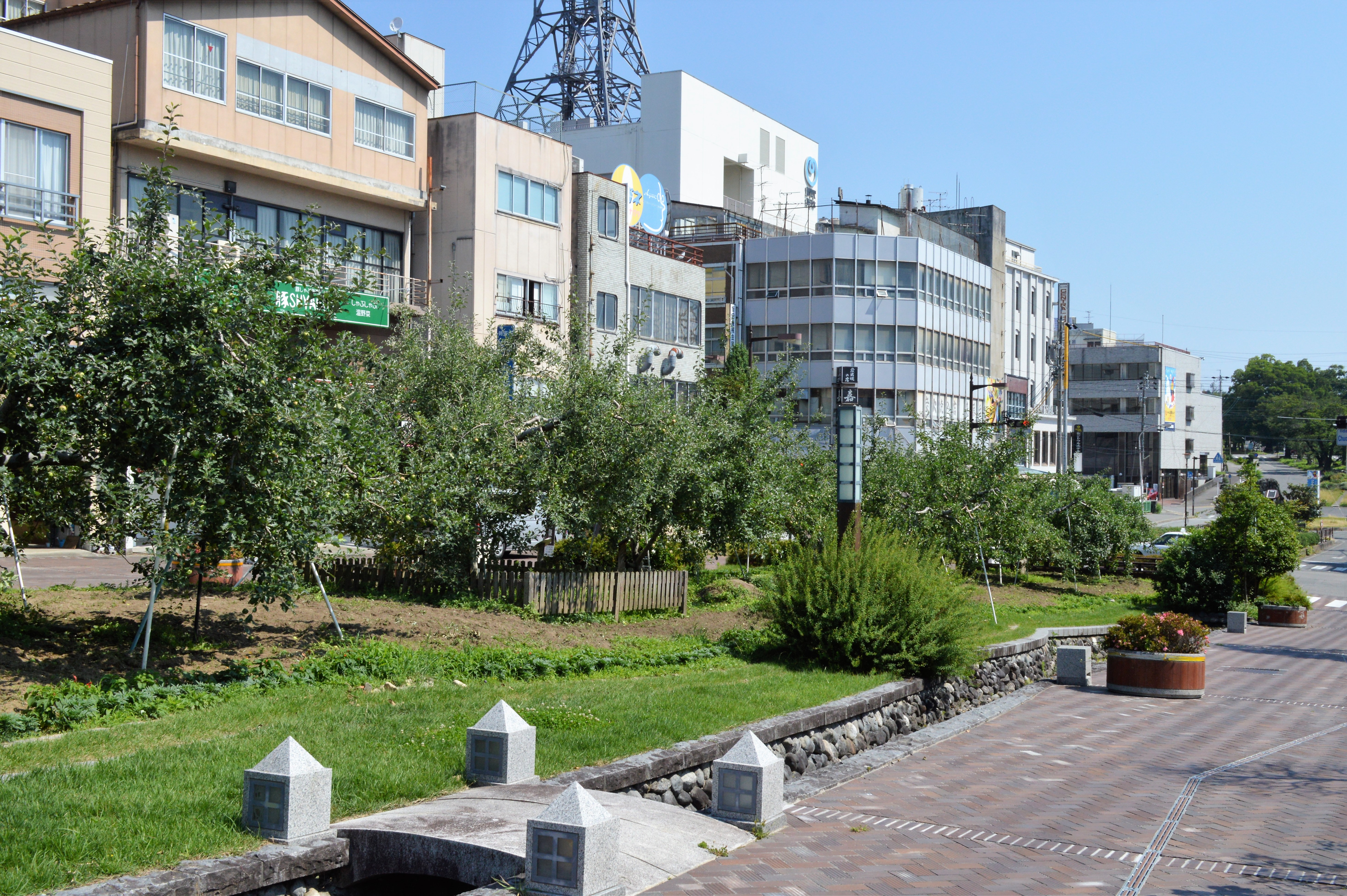
05.Iida

The following table lists the 34 cities, villages and towns in Nagano with a population of at least 10,000 on October 1, 2020, according to the 2020 Census. The table also gives an overview of the evolution of the population since the 1995 census.

Rank (2020)	Name	Status	2020	2015	2010	2005	2000	1995
1	Nagano	City	373,251	377,598	381,511	386,572	387,911	387,359
2	Matsumoto	City	241,337	243,293	243,037	242,541	243,465	239,539
3	Ueda	City	154,155	156,827	159,597	163,651	166,568	164,207
4	Saku	City	98,300	99,368	100,552	100,462	100,016	97,813
5	Iida	City	98,206	101,581	105,335	108,624	110,589	110,204
6	Azumino	City	94,278	95,282	96,479	96,266	92,864	88,231
7	Shiojiri	City	67,302	67,135	67,670	68,346	67,747	64,236
8	Ina	City	66,111	68,271	71,093	71,788	71,552	72,229
9	Chikuma	City	58,900	60,298	62,068	64,022	64,549	63,539
10	Chino	City	56,500	55,912	56,391	57,099	54,841	52,807
11	Suzaka	City	49,583	50,725	52,168	53,668	54,207	53,842
12	Suwa	City	48,774	50,140	51,200	53,240	53,858	52,104
13	Okaya	City	47,820	50,128	52,841	54,699	56,401	58,056
14	Nakano	City	42,361	43,909	45,638	46,788	47,845	47,529
15	Komoro	City	41,008	42,512	43,997	45,499	46,158	45,692
16	Komagane	City	32,218	32,759	33,693	34,417	34,338	33,601
17	Tōmi	City	30,154	30,107	30,696	31,271	30,944	30,176
18	Ōmachi	City	26,069	28,041	29,801	32,145	33,550	33,655
19	Minowa	Town	24,981	25,241	26,214	26,276	25,661	24,048
20	Iiyama	City	19,547	21,438	23,545	24,960	26,420	27,423
21	Karuizawa	Town	19,197	18,994	19,018	17,144	16,181	15,345
22	Shimosuwa	Town	19,171	20,236	21,532	22,863	23,930	24,535
23	Tatsuno	Town	18,562	19,770	20,909	21,801	22,407	23,193
24	Minamiminowa	Village	15,817	15,063	14,543	13,620	13,404	12,133
25	Miyota	Town	15,563	15,184	14,738	14,124	13,412	12,573
26	Fujimi	Town	14,108	14,493	15,338	15,528	15,392	15,362
27	Sakaki	Town	14,020	14,871	15,730	16,463	16,830	16,776
28	Takamori	Town	12,814	13,080	13,216	12,976	12,528	12,252
29	Matsukawa	Town	12,539	13,167	13,676	14,117	14,070	13,617
30	Yamanouchi	Town	11,363	12,429	13,678	14,704	15,900	16,951
31	Obuse	Town	10,661	10,702	11,072	11,477	11,460	11,436
32	Kiso	Town	10,583	11,826	12,743	13,900	14,866	15,221
33	Iizuna	Town	10,300	11,063	11,865	12,504	13,062	13,292
34	Sakuho	Town	10,217	11,186	12,069	12,980	13,622	13,740
