= List of cultural properties of Japan – historical materials (Nagano) =

This list is of the cultural properties of Japan designated in the category of historical materials (歴史資料, rekishi shiryō) for the Prefecture of Nagano.

== National Cultural Properties ==
As of 1 December 2014, two Important Cultural Properties have been designated, being of national significance.

Property	Date	Municipality	Ownership	Comments	Image	Coordinates	Ref.
Construction Plans of Zenkō-ji 善光寺造営図〈享禄四年四月／〉 Zenkōji zōei zu	1531	Nagano	Zenkō-ji Daikanjin	eight plans with different views of the rōmon, shōrō, kairō, Kumano Sansha, shinmeisha, and shikyakumon or four-legged gate		36°39′38″N 138°11′12″E	
Reflecting Telescope 反射望遠鏡 hansha bōenkyō	1834	Ueda	Ueda City Museum (上田市立博物館)	work of Kunitomo Ikkansai		36°24′13″N 138°14′47″E	

== Prefectural Cultural Properties ==
As of 1 December 2014, seven properties have been designated at a prefectural level.

Property	Date	Municipality	Ownership	Comments	Image	Coordinates	Ref.
Satoyamabe Ofune Matsuri Boat-Shaped Floats 里山辺お船祭のお船; Satoyama-be ofune matsuri no ofune	Edo to Taishō period	Matsumoto		the annual matsuri is held at Susukigawa Jinja (須々岐水神社) on 4/5 May		36°14′01″N 138°00′28″E	
Daikoku-chō Float 大黒町舞台; Daikoku-chō butai	1826	Ōmachi		the annual matsuri is held at Nyakuichiōji Jinja (若一王子神社) in July		36°30′57″N 137°51′13″E	
Daimonji Banner 大文字の旗; Daimonji no hata	Muromachi period	Chikuma	Nagano Prefectural Museum of History (長野県立歴史館)			36°32′02″N 138°08′07″E	
Festival Floats 祭り屋台 matsuri yatai	late Edo period	Obuse	Hokusaikan (北斎館)	pair of floats with ceiling paintings by Hokusai		36°41′39″N 138°19′02″E	
Eishō Jizō 永正地蔵尊及び石龕 附 五輪塔、板碑; Eishō Jizō zō oyobi sekigan tsuketari gorintō, itabi	1507	Iizuna		designation includes stone niche, gorintō, and stele		36°44′33″N 138°13′37″E	
Remains of the Iron Fukubachi from the Five-Storey Pagoda of the Upper Shrine Jingū-ji of Suwa Taisha 諏訪大社上社神宮寺五重塔 鉄製伏鉢残闕; Suwa Taisha Kamisha Jingūji gojūnotō tetsusei fusebachi zanketsu	1308	Suwa	Suwa City Museum (諏訪市博物館)			36°00′01″N 138°07′17″E	
Administrative Documents of Nagano Prefecture 長野県行政文書; Nagano-ken gyōsei bunsho	Edo to Shōwa period	Chikuma	Nagano Prefectural Museum of History (長野県立歴史館)	10,783 items		36°32′02″N 138°08′07″E	

== See also ==
- Cultural Properties of Japan
- List of National Treasures of Japan (historical materials)
- List of Historic Sites of Japan (Nagano)
- Shinano Province
- List of Cultural Properties of Japan - paintings (Nagano)
