= Ina-Matsushima Station =

Railway station in Minowa, Nagano Prefecture, Japan

Ina-Matsushima Station 伊那松島駅
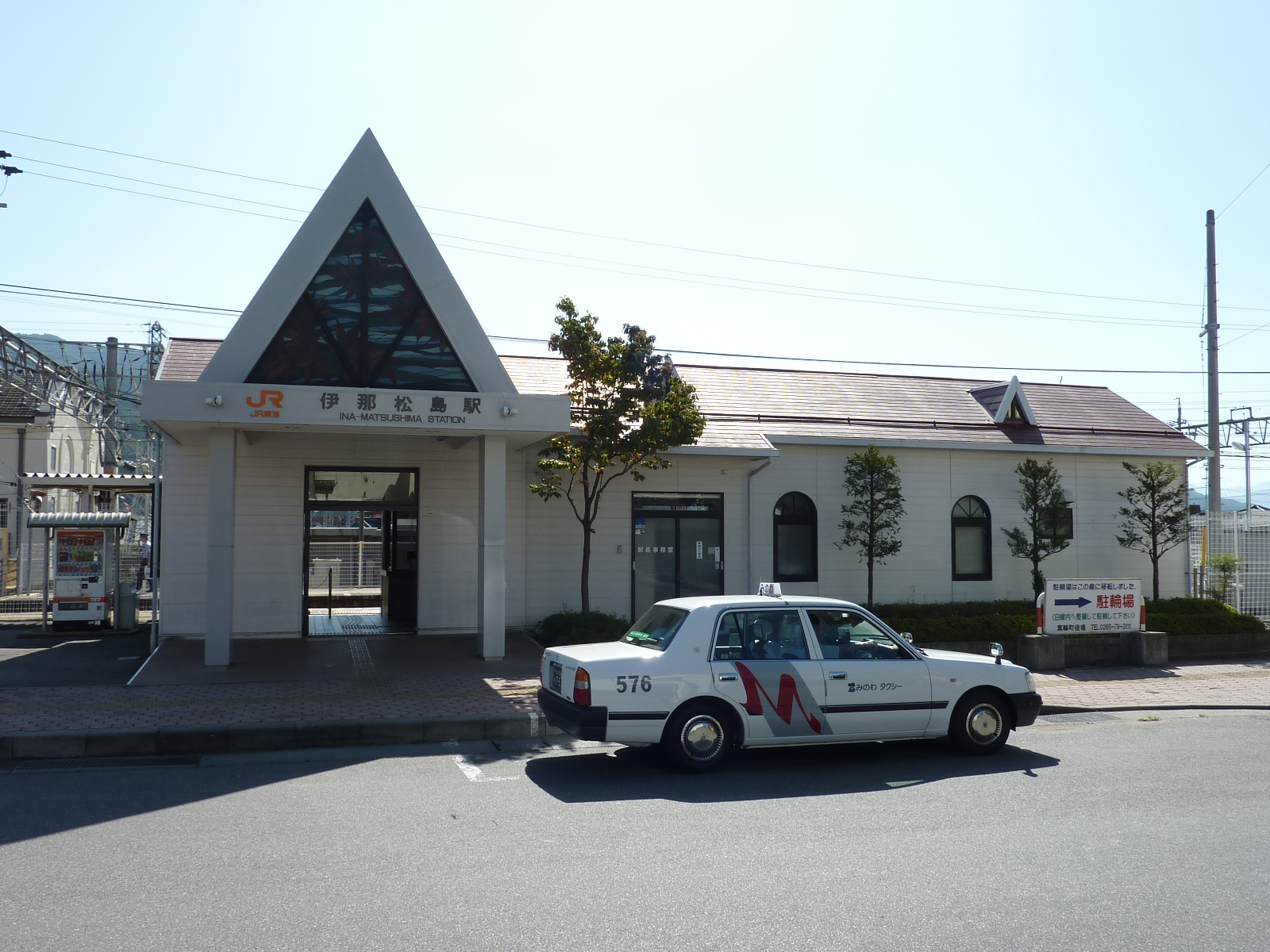
- Ina-Matsushima Station in September 2009

General information
- Location: 8336 Nakaminowa, Minowa-machi, Kamiina-gun, Nagano-ken 〒399-4601; Japan
- Coordinates: 35.9141°N 137.9885°E
- Elevation: 670 m (2,200 ft)
- Operator: JR Central
- Line: Iida Line
- Distance: 187.1 km from Toyohashi
- Platforms: 2 side platforms

Other information
- Status: Staffed

History
- Opened: 28 December 1909

Passengers
- FY2016: 503 daily
Location
- Location within Nagano Prefecture Location within Japan

Ina-Matsushima Station (伊那松島駅, Ina-Matsushima-eki) is a railway station on the Iida Line in the town of Minowa, Kamiina District, Nagano, Japan, operated by Central Japan Railway Company (JR Central).

== Lines ==
Ina-Matsushima Station is served by the Iida Line and is 187.1 kilometers from the starting point of the line at Toyohashi Station.

== Station layout ==
The station consists of two ground-level opposed side platforms connected by a level crossing. The station is staffed.

=== Platforms ===
1	■ Iida Line	for Tatsuno
2	■ Iida Line	for Iida and Tenryūkyō

== Adjacent stations ==
«	Service	»
Iida Line
Kinoshita	Rapid Misuzu	Sawa
Kitatono	Rapid	Sawa
Kinoshita	Local	Sawa

== History ==
The station opened on 28 December 1909 as Matsushima Station (松島駅). It was renamed Ina-Matsushima on 16 March 1923. With the privatization of Japanese National Railways (JNR) on 1 April 1987, the station came under the control of JR Central. The current station building was completed in 1991.

== Passenger statistics ==
In fiscal 2016, the station was used by an average of 503 passengers daily (boarding passengers only).

== Surrounding area ==
- Tenryū River
- Minowa Post Office

== See also ==
- List of railway stations in Japan
