= Tabata Station =

Tabata Station is the name of two train stations in Japan:

- Tabata Station (Nagano) – (田畑駅) in Nagano Prefecture
- Tabata Station (Tokyo) – (田端駅) in Tokyo
