= List of cultural properties of Japan – paintings (Nagano) =

This list is of the cultural properties of Japan designated in the category of paintings (絵画, kaiga) for the Prefecture of Nagano.

== National Cultural Properties ==
As of 1 September 2015, sixteen Important Cultural Properties have been designated, being of national significance.

Property	Date	Municipality	Ownership	Comments	Image	Dimensions	Coordinates	Ref.
Descent of Amida and Retinue, colour on silk 絹本著色阿弥陀聖衆来迎図 kenpon chakushoku Amida shōju raigō zu	Kamakura period (C14)	Nagano	Zenkō-ji			173.6 centimetres (68.3 in) by 107.2 centimetres (42.2 in)	36°39′43″N 138°11′17″E	
Kujaku Myōō, colour on silk 絹本著色孔雀明王像 kenpon chakushoku Kujaku Myōō zō	Kamakura period	Suwa	Sunritz Hattori Museum of Arts			116.7 centimetres (45.9 in) by 59.4 centimetres (23.4 in)	36°03′19″N 138°06′43″E	
Peach Blossoms with Small Bird, colour on silk 絹本著色桃花小禽図 kenpon chakushoku tōka shōkin zu	Southern Song	Suwa	Sunritz Hattori Museum of Arts			26.1 centimetres (10.3 in) by 24.5 centimetres (9.6 in)	36°03′19″N 138°06′43″E	
Eight Phase Nirvana Painting, colour on silk 絹本著色八相涅槃図 kenpon chakushoku hassō nehan zu	Kamakura period	Iida	Kaizen-ji (開善寺)			162.5 centimetres (64.0 in) by 116.0 centimetres (45.7 in)	35°27′44″N 137°48′53″E	
Arhats, colour on silk 絹本著色羅漢像 kenpon chakushoku rakan zō	Kamakura period	Suwa	Kyōnen-ji (教念寺)	pair of scrolls		136.4 centimetres (53.7 in) by 53.3 centimetres (21.0 in)	36°02′30″N 138°07′11″E	
Mandala of the Two Realms, colour on silk 絹本著色両界曼荼羅図 kenpon chakushoku ryōgai mandara zu	Kamakura period	Nagano	Seisui-ji (清水寺)	pair of scrolls		103.9 centimetres (40.9 in) by 86.1 centimetres (33.9 in)	36°32′39″N 138°12′04″E	
Landscape, ink on silk 絹本墨画山水図 kenpon chakushoku sansui zu	Muromachi period	Suwa	Sunritz Hattori Museum of Arts			101.4 centimetres (39.9 in) by 26.5 centimetres (10.4 in)	36°03′19″N 138°06′43″E	
Pictorial Biography of Ippen Shōnin, colour on paper 紙本著色一遍上人絵伝〈巻第二／〉 shihon chakushoku Ippen Shōnin e-den (maki dai ni)	Kamakura period	Saku	Kondai-ji (金台寺)	scroll 2; emakimono		34.1 centimetres (13.4 in) by 1,827.1 centimetres (59 ft 11.3 in)	36°13′29″N 138°28′10″E	
Pictorial Biography of Kōbō Daishi, colour on paper 紙本著色弘法大師絵伝 shihon chakushoku Kōbō Daishi e-den	Kamakura period	Suwa	Sunritz Hattori Museum of Arts			33.8 centimetres (13.3 in) by 511.9 centimetres (16 ft 9.5 in)	36°03′19″N 138°06′43″E	
Ōnakatomi no Yoshinobu from the Thirty-Six Immortals of Poetry, colour on paper 紙本著色三十六歌仙切〈（能宣）／佐竹家伝来〉 shihon chakushoku sanjūrokkasen kiri (Yoshinobu / Satake-ke denrai)	Kamakura period	Suwa	Sunritz Hattori Museum of Arts	from the Satake Family Collection		36.5 centimetres (14.4 in) by 57.8 centimetres (1 ft 10.8 in)	36°03′19″N 138°06′43″E	
Fujiwara Yoshinobu from the Thirty-Six Immortals of Poetry, colour on paper 紙本著色藤原能宣像〈／（上畳本三十六歌仙切）〉 shihon chakushoku Fujiwara Yoshinobu zō (Agedatami-hon sanjūrokkasen kiri)	Kamakura period	Suwa	Sunritz Hattori Museum of Arts	from the Agedatami Edition			36°03′19″N 138°06′43″E	
Legends of Kitano Tenjin, colour on paper 紙本著色北野天神縁起〈残闕（弘安本）／（尊意参内）〉 shihon chakushoku Kitano Tenjin engi (zanketsu / Kōan hon / soni sandai)	1278	Suwa	Sunritz Hattori Museum of Arts	Kōan Edition		28.0 centimetres (11.0 in) by 76.4 centimetres (2 ft 6.1 in)	36°03′19″N 138°06′43″E	
Hanshan and Shide, colour on paper, by Indara 紙本墨画寒山拾得図〈因陀羅筆／〉 shihon bokuga Kanzan Jittoku zu (Indara hitsu)	Yuan dynasty	Suwa	Sunritz Hattori Museum of Arts	pair of scrolls		28.0 centimetres (11.0 in) by 76.4 centimetres (2 ft 6.1 in)	36°03′19″N 138°06′43″E	
Waterfront Tower in Hangzhou, ink and light colour on paper 紙本墨画淡彩望海楼図 shihon bokuga tansai bōkairō zu	1435	Suwa	Sunritz Hattori Museum of Arts			105.4 centimetres (41.5 in) by 34.8 centimetres (1 ft 1.7 in)	36°03′19″N 138°06′43″E	
Kannon flanked by a Dragon and a Tiger, ink on paper, by Kanō Kōi 紙本墨画中観音左右竜虎図〈狩野興以筆／〉 shihon bokuga naka Kannon sayū ryūko zu (Kanō Kōi hitsu)	early Edo period	Ina	Kenpuku-ji (建福寺)	three scrolls		167.3 centimetres (65.9 in) by 106.1 centimetres (3 ft 5.8 in)	35°50′17″N 138°03′24″E	
Grapes, ink on paper 紙本墨書葡萄図〈日観筆／辛卯ノ自賛アリ〉 shihon bokusho budō zu	Yuan dynasty	Suwa	Sunritz Hattori Museum of Arts			97.8 centimetres (38.5 in) by 42.1 centimetres (1 ft 4.6 in)	36°03′19″N 138°06′43″E	

== Prefectural Cultural Properties ==
As of 16 April 2015, twenty-one properties have been designated at a prefectural level.

Property	Date	Municipality	Ownership	Comments	Image	Dimensions	Coordinates	Ref.
Shaka Triad, colour on sik 絹本著色釈迦三尊像 kenpon chakushoku Shaka sanzon zō	Kamakura period	Saku	Zenkō-ji Daikanshin (大勧進)			96.3 centimetres (37.9 in) by 40.2 centimetres (1 ft 3.8 in)	36°39′38″N 138°11′12″E	for all refs see

== See also ==
- Cultural Properties of Japan
- List of National Treasures of Japan (paintings)
- Japanese painting
- List of Historic Sites of Japan (Nagano)
- List of Cultural Properties of Japan - historical materials (Nagano)
