= Sawa Station =

Sawa Station is the name of two train stations in Japan:

- Sawa Station (Ibaraki) (佐和駅)
- Sawa Station (Nagano) (沢駅)
