= Enrei Ōjō Prefectural Natural Park =

Natural park of Nagano prefecture, Japan

- 塩嶺王城県立自然公園
- IUCN category V (protected landscape/seascape)
- Location within Nagano Prefecture Location within Japan
- Interactive map of Enrei Ōjō Prefectural Natural Park
- Location: Nagano Prefecture, Japan
- Coordinates: 36°05′N 138°01′E
- Area: 13.40 km^{2} (5.17 sq mi)
- Established: 25 June 1964

Enrei Ōjō Prefectural Natural Park (塩嶺王城県立自然公園, Enrei Ōjō kenritsu shizen kōen) is a Prefectural Natural Park in central Nagano Prefecture, Japan. Established in 1964, the park spans the borders of the municipalities of Okaya, Shiojiri, and Tatsuno.

== See also ==
- National Parks of Japan
