= Shinshu Honan Junior College =

Private junior college

Coordinates: 35°58′20.8″N 138°0′9.1″E

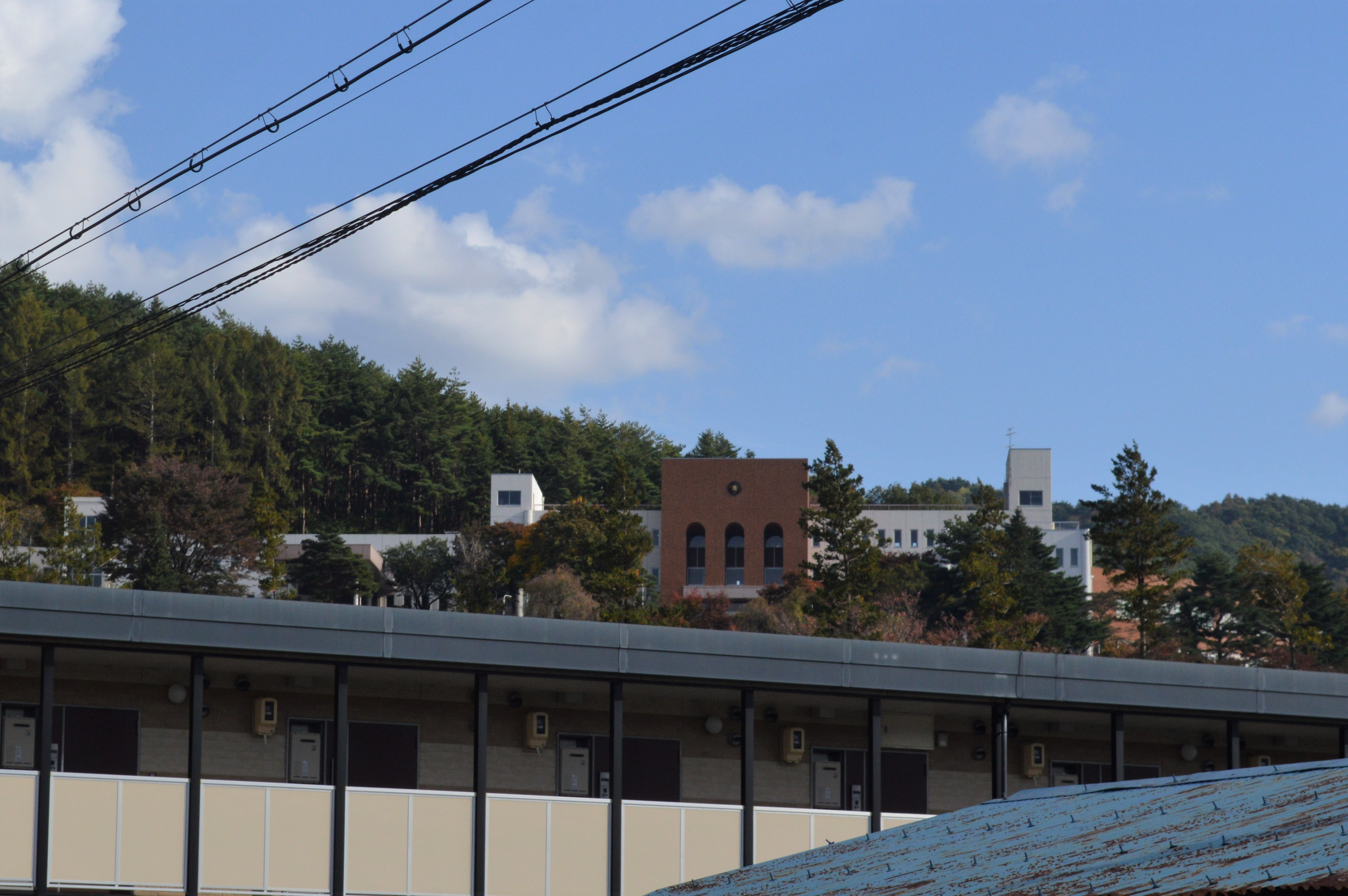

Shinshu Honan Junior College (信州豊南短期大学, Shinshū honan tanki daigaku) is a private junior college in Tatsuno, Nagano, Japan. It was originally established as a women's junior college in 1983. In 2000, it became coeducational.
