= Sunritz Hattori Museum of Arts =

- サンリツ服部美術館
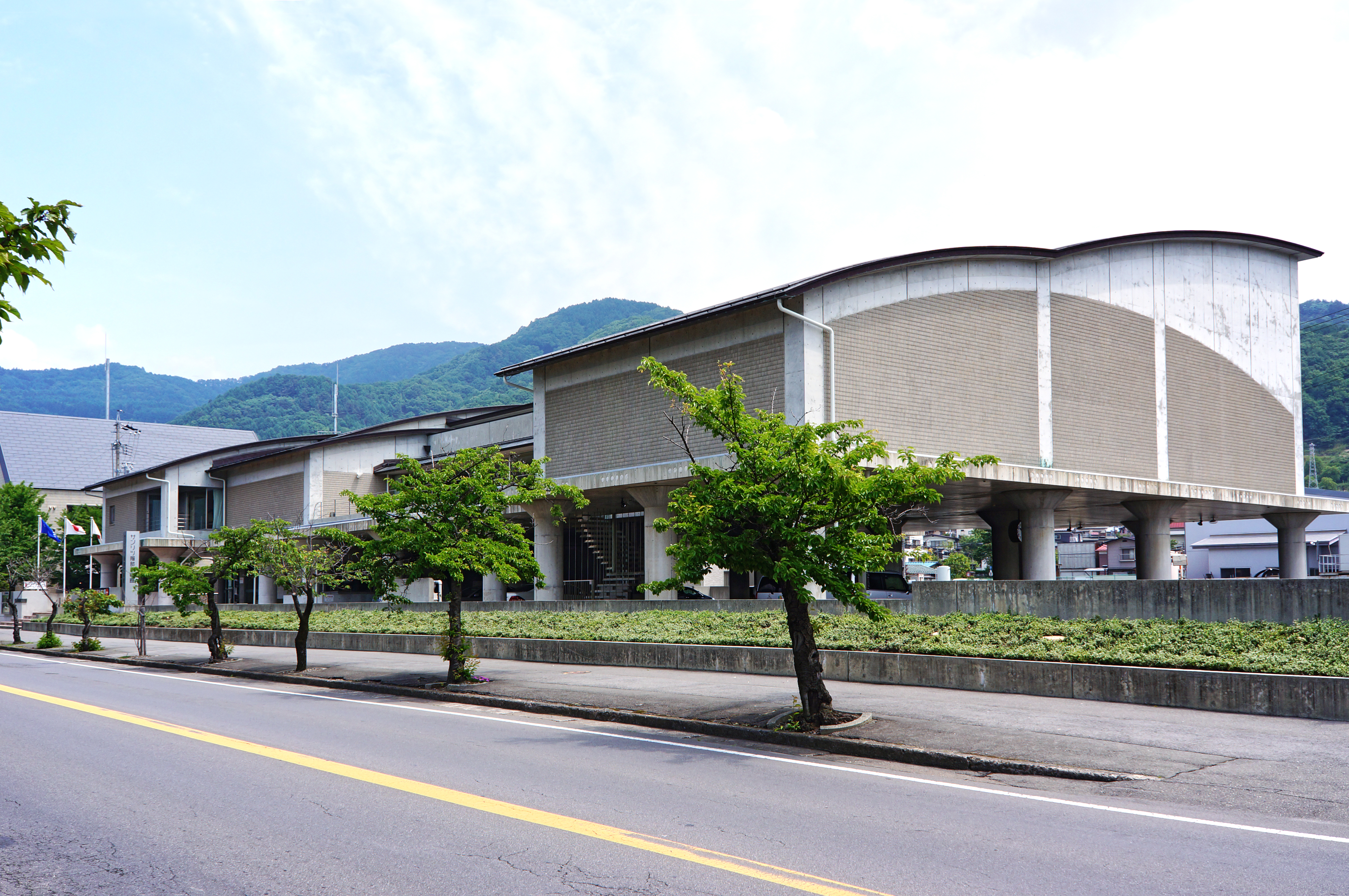
- Interactive map of the Sunritz Hattori Museum of Arts area

General information
- Location: 2-1-1 Kogandōri, Suwa, Nagano Prefecture, Japan
- Coordinates: 36°03′19″N 138°06′43″E
- Opened: 1995

Design and construction
- Architect: Shōzō Uchii

Website
- Official website

Sunritz Hattori Museum of Arts (サンリツ服部美術館, Sanritsu Hattori bijutsukan) is located on the shore of Lake Suwa in Suwa, Nagano Prefecture, Japan. Designed by Shōzō Uchii, it opened in 1995. The collection includes works by Renoir and Chagall, Ogata Kōrin and Sakai Hōitsu, as well as one of the two Japanese National Treasure tea bowls, Fuji-san by Honami Kōetsu.

== See also ==
- List of Cultural Properties of Japan - paintings (Nagano)
