= Inakita Station =

Railway station in Ina, Nagano Prefecture, Japan

Inakita Station 伊那北駅
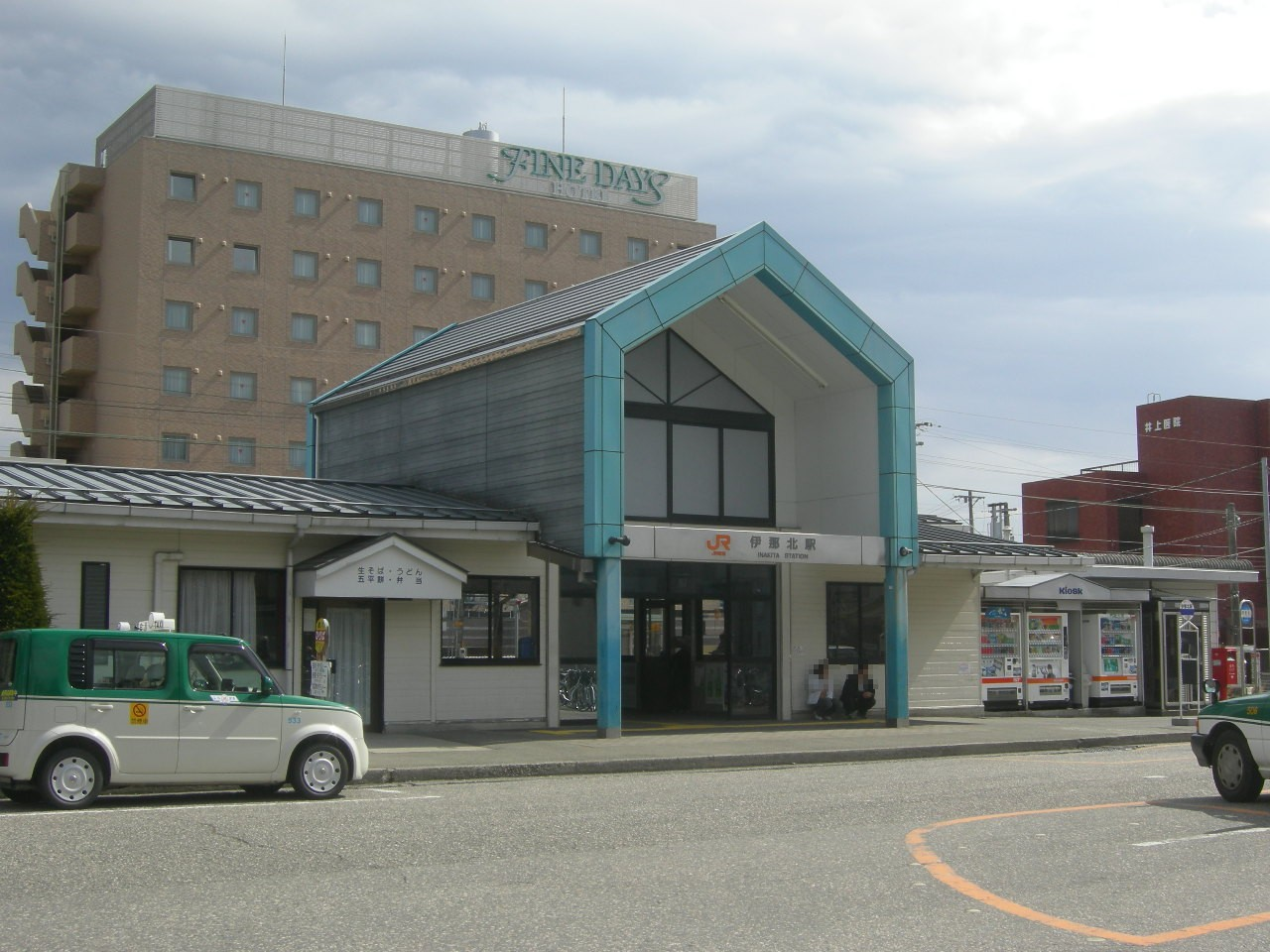
- Inakita Station in March 2008

General information
- Location: 1930 Yamadera, Ina-shi, Nagano-ken 396-0023; Japan
- Coordinates: 35.8456°N 137.9642°E
- Elevation: 643 meters
- Operator: JR Central
- Line: Iida Line
- Distance: 178.9 km from Toyohashi
- Platforms: 1 side + 1 island platforms

Other information
- Status: Unstaffed

History
- Opened: 4 January 1912

Passengers
- FY2015: 1,112 daily
Location
- Location within Nagano Prefecture Location within Japan

Inakita Station (伊那北駅, Inakita-eki) is a railway station on the Iida Line in the city of Ina, Nagano Prefecture, Japan, operated by Central Japan Railway Company (JR Central).

== Lines ==
Inakita Station is served by the Iida Line and is 178.9 kilometers from the starting point of the line at Toyohashi Station.

== Station layout ==
The station consists of one ground-level side platform and one island platform connected by a level crossing. The station is unattended.

=== Platforms ===
1	■ Iida Line	for Tatsuno
2, 3	■ Iida Line	for Iida and Tenryūkyō

== Adjacent stations ==
«	Service	»
Iida Line
Inashi	Rapid Misuzu	Tabata
Inashi	Local	Tabata

== History ==
Inakita Station opened on 4 January 1912. With the privatization of Japanese National Railways (JNR) on 1 April 1987, the station came under the control of JR Central. The current station building was completed in 1991.

== Passenger statistics ==
In fiscal 2015, the station was used by an average of 1012 passengers daily (boarding passengers only).

== Surrounding area ==
- Ina Kita High School
- Ina Chuo Hospital

== See also ==
- List of railway stations in Japan
