= Kinoshita Station =

Railway station in Minowa, Nagano Prefecture, Japan

Kinoshita Station 木ノ下駅
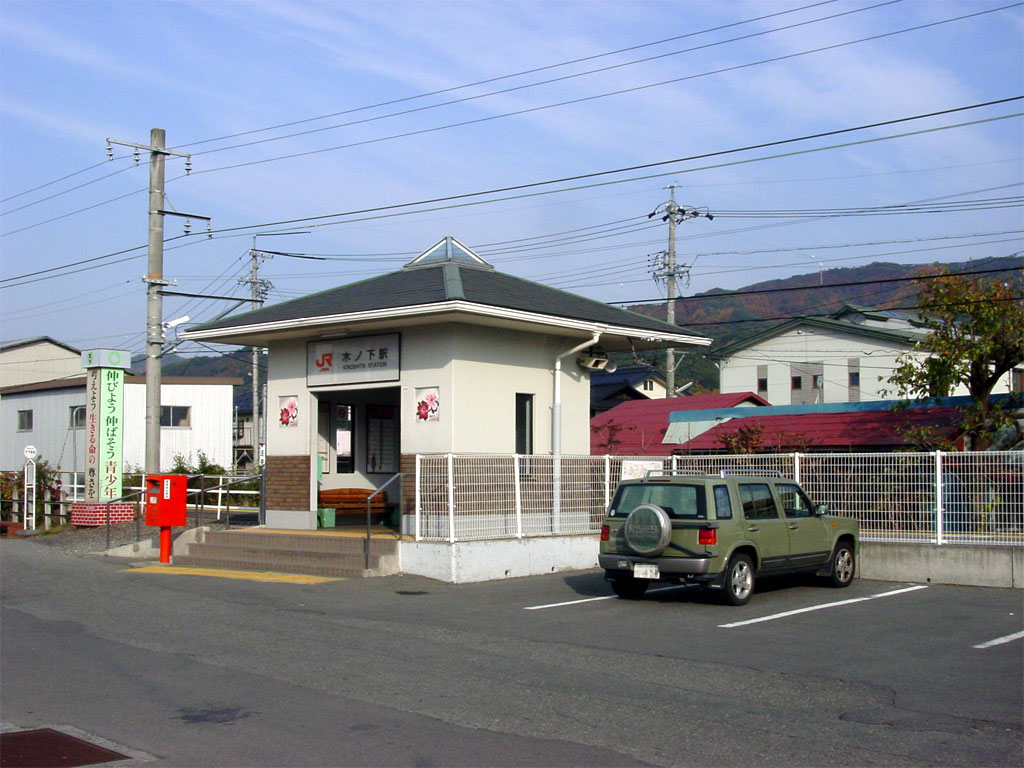
- Kinoshita Station in November 2005

General information
- Location: 11945 Nakaminowa, Minowa-machi, Kamiina-gun, Nagano-ken 399-4601; Japan
- Coordinates: 35.9011°N 137.9879°E
- Elevation: 676 m (2,218 ft)
- Operator: JR Central
- Line: Iida Line
- Distance: 185.6 km from Toyohashi
- Platforms: 1 side platform

Other information
- Status: Unstaffed

History
- Opened: 22 February 1911

Passengers
- FY2016: 414 daily
Location
- Location within Nagano Prefecture Location within Japan

Kinoshita Station (木ノ下駅, Kinoshita-eki) is a railway station on the Iida Line in the town of Minowa, Kamiina District, Nagano, Japan, operated by Central Japan Railway Company (JR Central).

== Lines ==
Kinoshita Station is served by the Iida Line and is 185.6 kilometers from the starting point of the line at Toyohashi Station.

== Station layout ==
The station consists of one ground-level side platform serving a single bi-directional track. There is no station building, but only a shelter built on top of the platform. The station is unattended.

== Adjacent stations ==
«	Service	»
Iida Line
Kitatono	Rapid Misuzu	Ina-Matsushima
Kitatono	Local	Ina-Matsushima

== History ==
Kinoshita Station opened on 22 February 1911. With the privatization of Japanese National Railways (JNR) on 1 April 1987, the station came under the control of JR Central. The current station building was completed in 1997.

== Passenger statistics ==
In fiscal 2016, the station was used by an average of 414 passengers daily (boarding passengers only).

== Surrounding area ==
- National Route 153
- Tenryū River

== See also ==
- List of railway stations in Japan
