= Sawa Station (Nagano) =

Railway station in Minowa, Nagano Prefecture, Japan

Sawa Station 沢駅
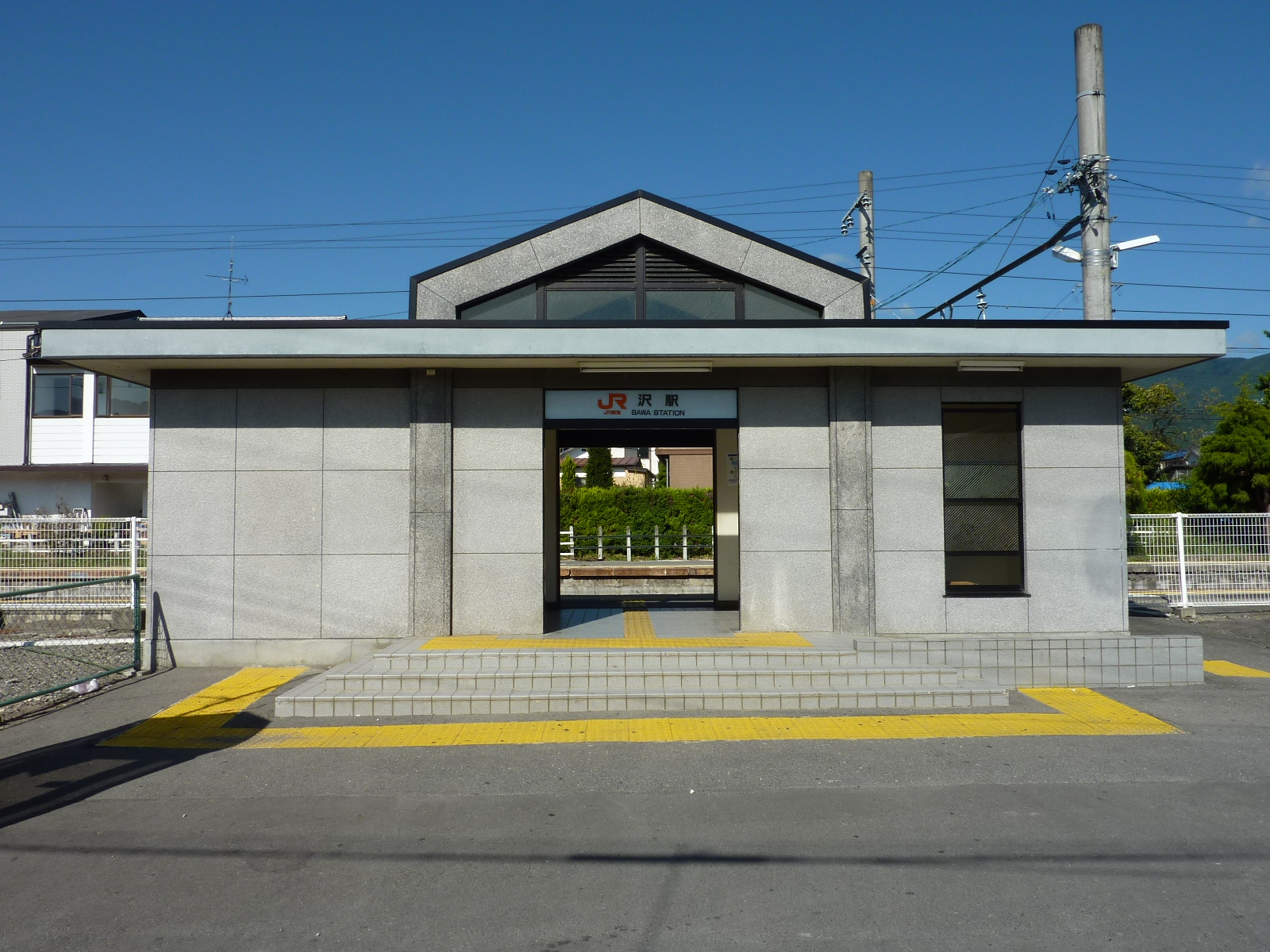
- Sawa Station in September 2009

General information
- Location: 500 Nakaminawa, Minowa-machi, Kamiina-gun, Nagano 399-4601; Japan
- Coordinates: 35.9362°N 137.9854°E
- Elevation: 702 m (2,303 ft)
- Operator: JR Central
- Line: Iida Line
- Distance: 189.7 km from Toyohashi
- Platforms: 1 side platform

Other information
- Status: Unstaffed

History
- Opened: 16 March 1923

Passengers
- FY2016: 344 daily
Location
- Location within Nagano Prefecture Location within Japan

Sawa Station (沢駅, Sawa-eki) is a railway station on the Iida Line in the town of Minowa, Kamiina District, Nagano Prefecture, Japan, operated by Central Japan Railway Company (JR Central).

== Lines ==
Sawa Station is served by the Iida Line and is 189.7 kilometers from the starting point of the line at Toyohashi Station.

== Station layout ==
The station consists of one ground-level side platform serving a single bi-directional track. There is no station building, but only a shelter built on top of the platform. The station is unattended.

== Adjacent stations ==
«	Service	»
Iida Line
Ina-Matsushima	Rapid Misuzu	Haba
Ina-Matsushima	Local	Haba

== History ==
Sawa Station opened on 16 March 1923. With the privatization of Japanese National Railways (JNR) on 1 April 1987, the station came under the control of JR Central. The current station building was completed in 1996.

== Passenger statistics ==
In fiscal 2016, the station was used by an average of 344 passengers daily (boarding passengers only).

== Surrounding area ==
- Minowa Kita Elementary School

== See also ==
- List of railway stations in Japan
