= Tatsuno, Nagano =

Tatsuno 辰野町
- Town
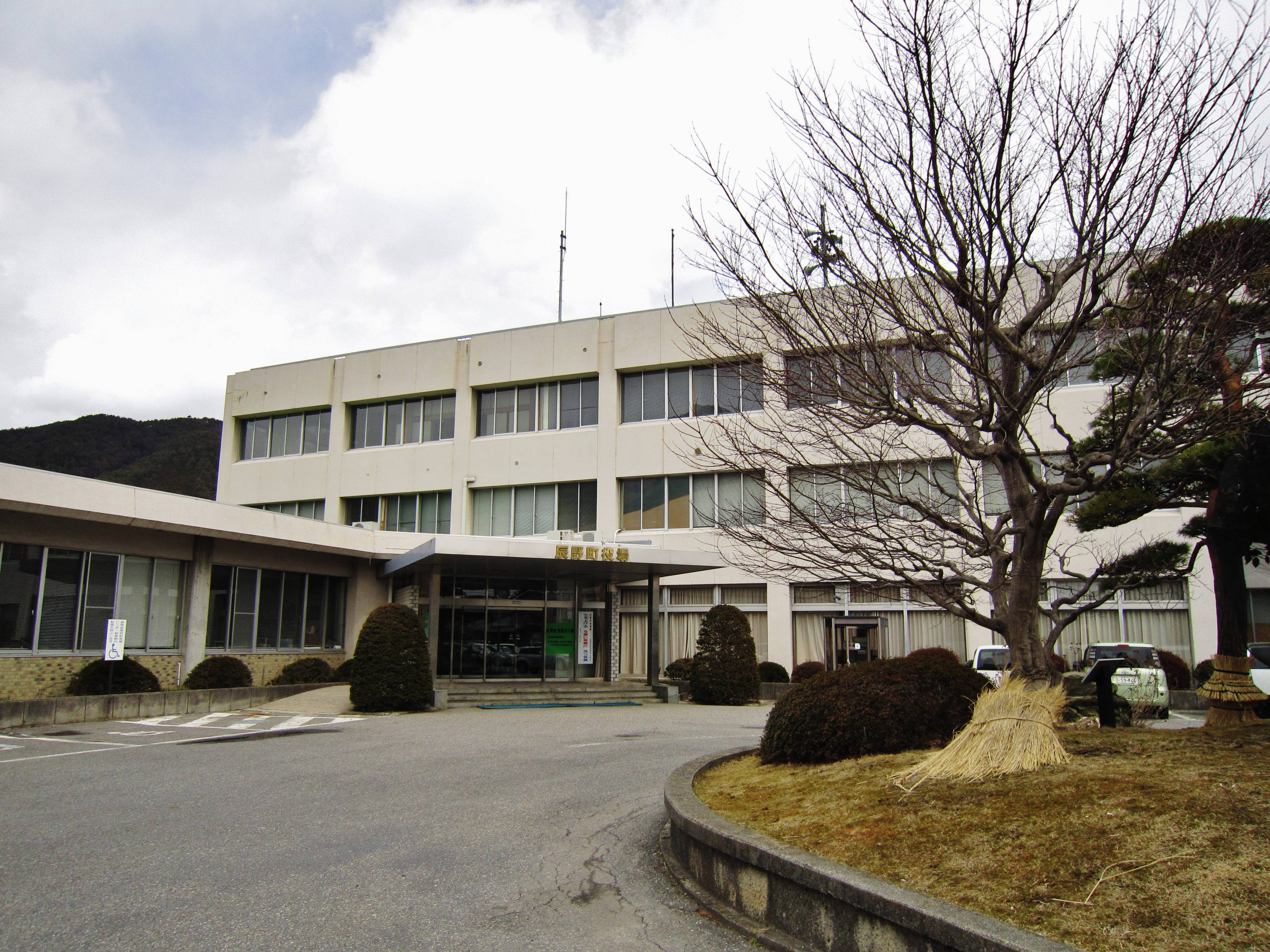
- Tatsuno Town Hall

- Flag Seal

- Location of Tatsuno in Nagano Prefecture

- Coordinates: 35°58′56.7″N 137°59′15.2″E
- Country: Japan
- Region: Chūbu (Kōshin'etsu)
- Prefecture: Nagano
- District: Kamiina

Area
  - Total: 169.20 km^{2} (65.33 sq mi)

Population (June 1, 2019)
  - Total: 18,951
  - Density: 112.00/km^{2} (290.09/sq mi)
- Time zone: UTC+9 (Japan Standard Time)
- Phone number: 0266-41-1111
- Address: 1-banchi, Chuo Nakaminowa, Tatsuno-machi, Kitaina-gun, Nagano-ken 399-0493
- Climate: Cfa/Dfa
- Website: Official website
- Symbols
- Flower: Adonis amurensis

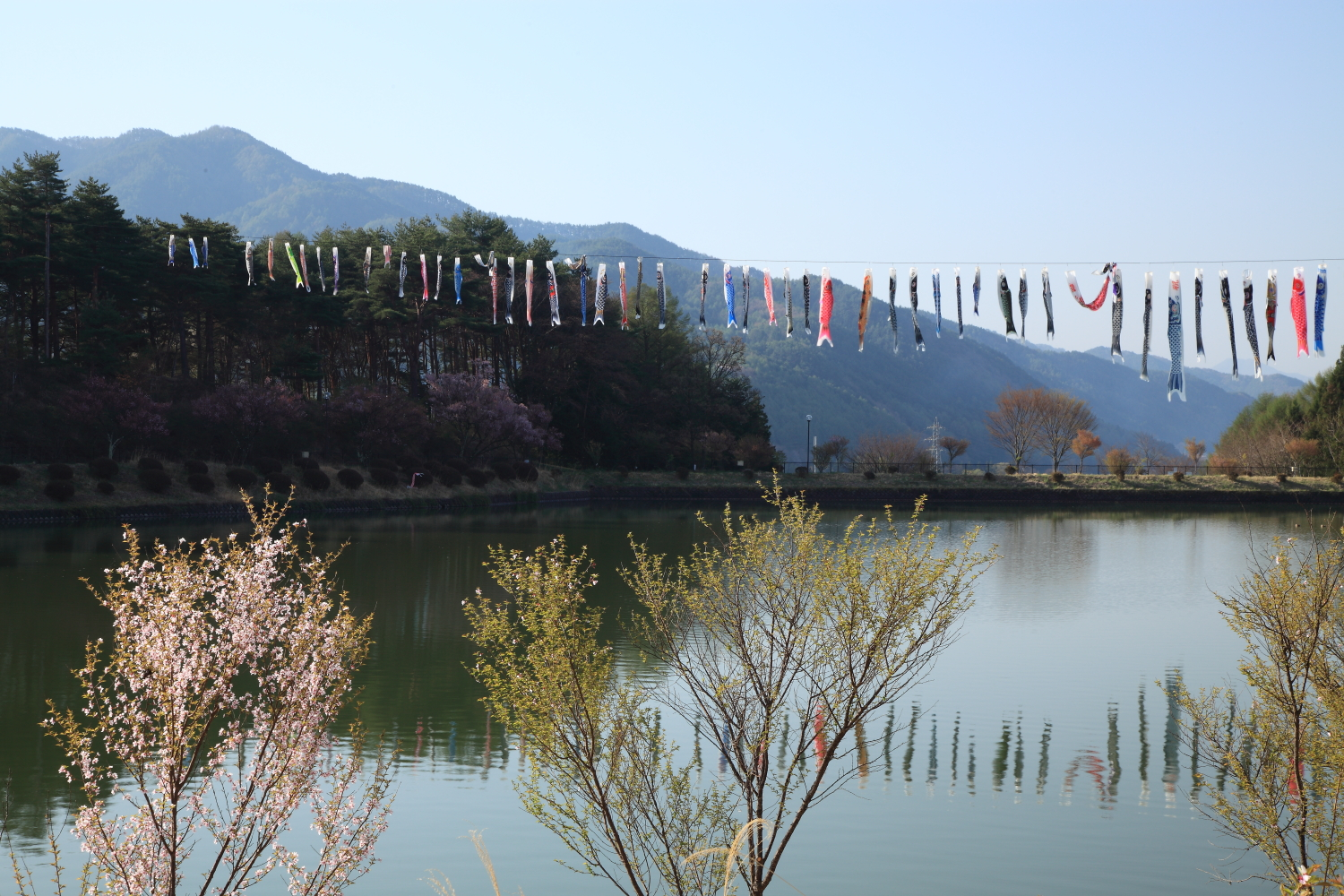
Kojinyama Park, Tatsuno

Tatsuno (辰野町, Tatsuno-machi) is a town located in Nagano Prefecture, Japan. As of 1 June 2019, the town had an estimated population of 18,951 in 7917 households, and a population density of 112 persons per km^{2}. The total area of the town is 169.20 square kilometres (65.33 sq mi).

== Geography ==
Tatsuno is located in the Ina Valley of south-central Nagano Prefecture, bordered by the Kiso Mountains. The Tenryū River flows through the town, which is surrounded by mountains and is rich in a natural environment. It is takes about 3 hours from Tokyo, 2 hours from Nagoya, 5 hours from Kyoto by train and equally by car. Part of the town is within the borders of the Enrei Ōjō Prefectural Natural Park. The Yokokawa Dam is located in Tatsuno.

In the city neighbourhood, the geographical center of Japan is located.

=== Surrounding municipalities ===
- Nagano Prefecture
  - Minamiminowa
  - Minowa
  - Okaya
  - Shiojiri
  - Suwa

=== Climate ===
The village has a climate characterized by characterized by warm and humid summers, and cold winters (Köppen climate classification Dfa). The average annual temperature in Tatsuno is 11.1 °C (52.0 °F). The average annual rainfall is 1,435.8 mm (56.53 in) with July as the wettest month. The temperatures are highest on average in August, at around 23.6 °C (74.5 °F), and lowest in January, at around −1.2 °C (29.8 °F).

Climate data for Tatsuno (1991−2020 normals, extremes 1978−present)
Month	Jan	Feb	Mar	Apr	May	Jun	Jul	Aug	Sep	Oct	Nov	Dec	Year
Record high °C (°F)	15.1 (59.2)	18.4 (65.1)	25.5 (77.9)	29.5 (85.1)	32.6 (90.7)	35.7 (96.3)	36.4 (97.5)	36.4 (97.5)	34.1 (93.4)	29.0 (84.2)	23.0 (73.4)	18.8 (65.8)	36.4 (97.5)
Mean daily maximum °C (°F)	3.9 (39.0)	5.3 (41.5)	10.0 (50.0)	16.6 (61.9)	22.0 (71.6)	24.9 (76.8)	28.4 (83.1)	29.9 (85.8)	25.0 (77.0)	18.7 (65.7)	12.8 (55.0)	6.9 (44.4)	17.0 (62.7)
Daily mean °C (°F)	−1.2 (29.8)	−0.3 (31.5)	3.6 (38.5)	9.7 (49.5)	15.2 (59.4)	19.0 (66.2)	22.8 (73.0)	23.6 (74.5)	19.3 (66.7)	12.9 (55.2)	6.7 (44.1)	1.5 (34.7)	11.1 (51.9)
Mean daily minimum °C (°F)	−6.1 (21.0)	−5.6 (21.9)	−1.9 (28.6)	3.3 (37.9)	9.1 (48.4)	14.2 (57.6)	18.7 (65.7)	19.3 (66.7)	15.2 (59.4)	8.5 (47.3)	1.8 (35.2)	−3.1 (26.4)	6.1 (43.0)
Record low °C (°F)	−16.7 (1.9)	−17.2 (1.0)	−16.2 (2.8)	−8.0 (17.6)	−0.5 (31.1)	4.6 (40.3)	11.5 (52.7)	11.2 (52.2)	3.7 (38.7)	−2.1 (28.2)	−7.7 (18.1)	−14.8 (5.4)	−17.2 (1.0)
Average precipitation mm (inches)	45.6 (1.80)	58.1 (2.29)	102.5 (4.04)	106.5 (4.19)	129.7 (5.11)	174.2 (6.86)	214.4 (8.44)	149.7 (5.89)	179.1 (7.05)	146.7 (5.78)	78.4 (3.09)	50.9 (2.00)	1,435.8 (56.53)
Average precipitation days (≥ 1.0 mm)	6.4	6.2	9.7	9.5	10.4	12.6	13.6	10.2	11.0	9.3	7.6	7.1	113.6
Mean monthly sunshine hours	164.2	168.1	187.6	195.4	202.6	160.9	162.1	194.2	145.7	151.0	156.4	156.7	2,044
Source: Japan Meteorological Agency

== History ==
The area of present-day Tatsuno was part of ancient Shinano Province. The village of Inatomi established on April 1, 1889, by the establishment of the municipalities system, and was elevated to town status on January 1, 1947, changing its name to Tatsuno at that time. The neighboring village of Asahi was annexed on April 1, 1955, followed by Kawashima on September 30, 1956, and Ono on March 31, 1961.

== Demographics ==
Per Japanese census data, the population of Tatsuno has declined slightly in recent decades.

Historical population
Year	Pop.	±%
1940	20,842	—
1950	24,146	+15.9%
1960	22,419	−7.2%
1970	22,351	−0.3%
1980	23,894	+6.9%
1990	23,901	+0.0%
2000	22,407	−6.3%
2010	20,909	−6.7%
2020	18,555	−11.3%

== Education ==
Tatsuno has five public elementary schools and five public middle school operated by the town government, and one high school operated the Nagano Prefectural Board of Education. The Shinshu Honan Junior College is also located in Tatsuno.

== Transportation ==
=== Railway ===
- East Japan Railway Company - Chūō Main Line (old line)
  - Tatsuno - Shinano-Kawashima - Ono
- Central Japan Railway Company - Iida Line
  - Haba - Ina-Shimmachi - Miyaki - Tatsuno

=== Highway ===
- Chūō Expressway
- National Route 153

== International relations ==
- - Waitomo, New Zealand.

== Local attractions ==
- The geographical centre of Japan.
- Enrei Ōjō Prefectural Natural Park
- Matsuo-kyo (松尾峡): one of the most famous places in Japan for fireflies (called Genji fireflies (ゲンジボタル) in Japan) every summer. However, the intentional introduction of non-native fireflies and its negative influence on the native fireflies of Tatsuno were highlighted in an academic journal. and several major newspapers.
