= Minamiminowa =

Minamiminowa 南箕輪村
- Village
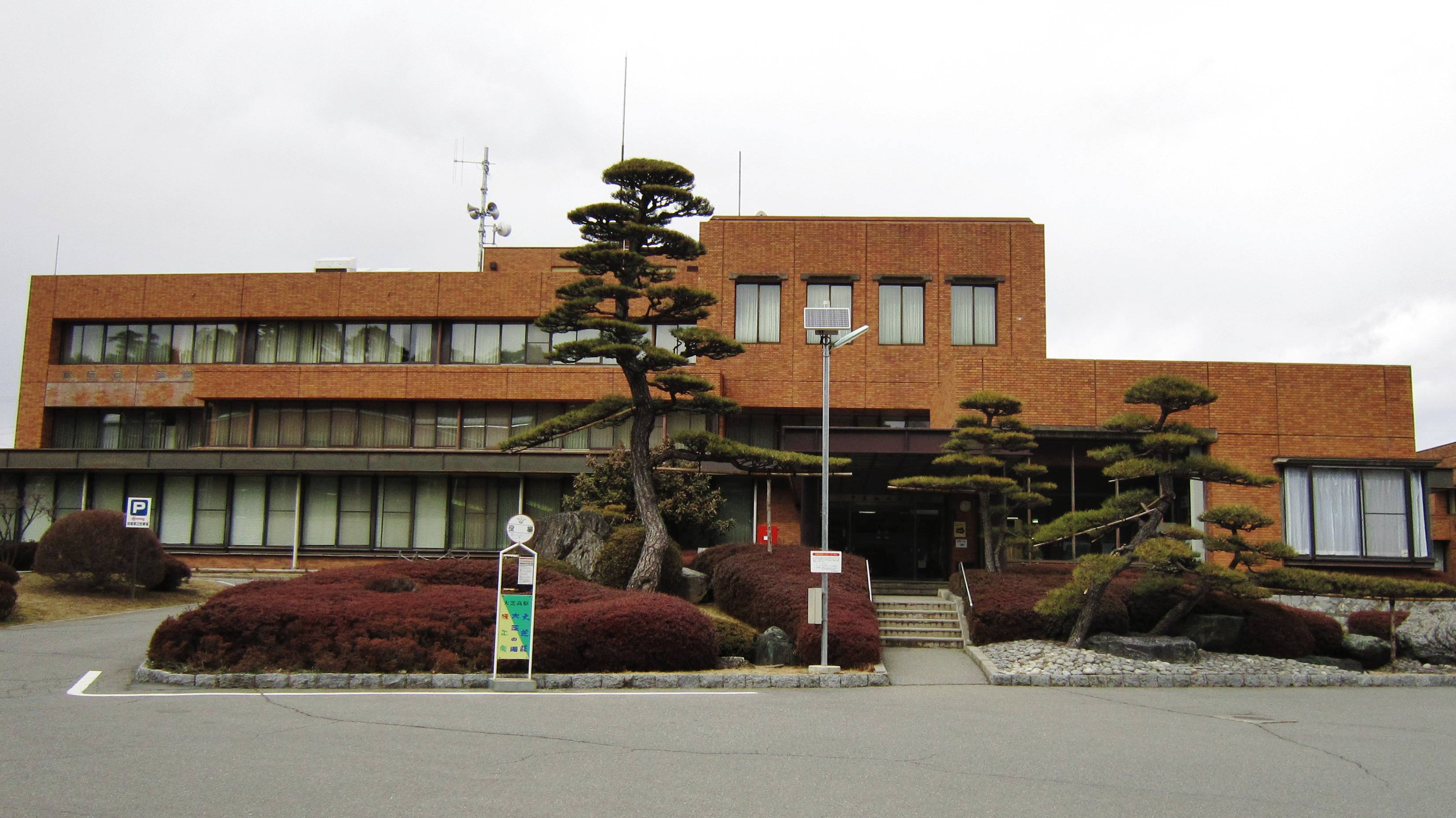
- Minamiminowa Village Hall

- Flag Seal

- Location of Minamiminowa in Nagano Prefecture

- Coordinates: 35°52′22.3″N 137°58′30.4″E
- Country: Japan
- Region: Chūbu (Kōshin'etsu)
- Prefecture: Nagano
- District: Kamiina

Area
  - Total: 40.99 km^{2} (15.83 sq mi)

Population (April 2019)
  - Total: 15,463
  - Density: 377.2/km^{2} (977.0/sq mi)
- Time zone: UTC+9 (Japan Standard Time)
- Symbols
  - Tree: Pinus densiflora
  - Flower: Chrysanthemum
- Phone number: 0265-72-2104
- Address: 4825-1 Minamiminowamura, Kamiina-gun, Nagano-ken 399-4592
- Website: Official website

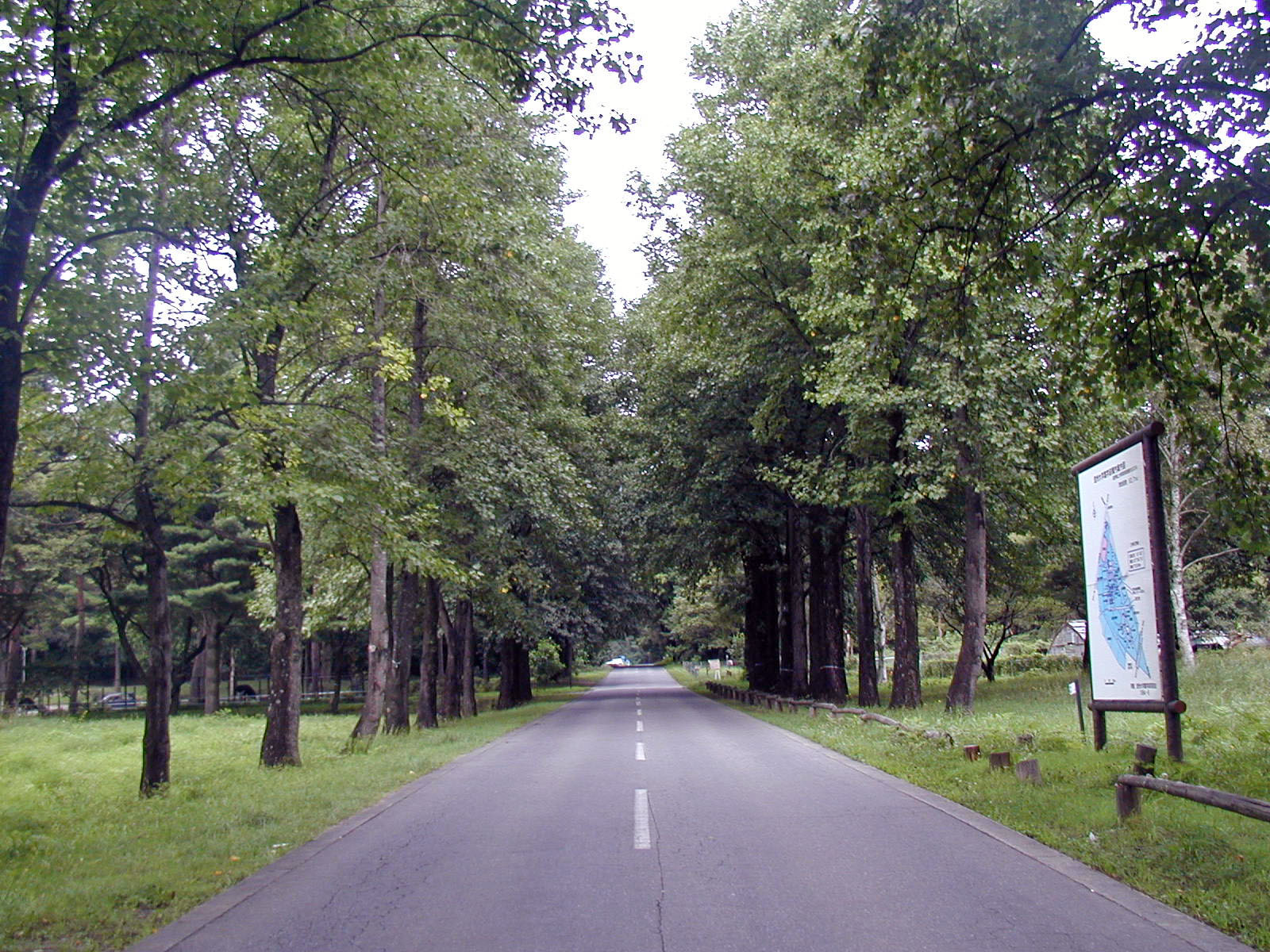
Entry to Shinshu University Agricultural Department in Minamiminowa

Minamiminowa (南箕輪村, Minamiminowa-mura) is a village located in Nagano Prefecture, Japan. As of 1 April 2019, the village had an estimated population of 15,463 in 6115 households, and a population density of 371 persons per km^{2}. The total area of the village is 40.99 square kilometres (15.83 sq mi).

== Geography ==
Minamiminowa is located in the Ina Valley of south-central Nagano Prefecture, bordered by the Kiso Mountains to the west. The Tenryū River flows through the village. The village consists of two separate geographic areas, separated from each other by Ina City.

=== Surrounding municipalities ===
- Nagano Prefecture
  - Ina
  - Minowa
  - Shiojiri
  - Tatsuno

=== Climate ===
The town has a climate characterized by characterized by hot and humid summers, and cold winters (Köppen climate classification Cfa). The average annual temperature in Minamiminowa is 11.5 °C. The average annual rainfall is 1370 mm with September as the wettest month. The temperatures are highest on average in August, at around 24.4 °C, and lowest in January, at around -0.8 °C.

== Demographics ==
Per Japanese census data, the population of Minamiminowa has seen strong growth over the past 60 years.

Historical population
Year	Pop.	±%
1940	4,466	—
1950	6,360	+42.4%
1960	6,043	−5.0%
1970	6,660	+10.2%
1980	8,877	+33.3%
1990	10,666	+20.2%
2000	13,404	+25.7%
2010	14,543	+8.5%
2020	15,797	+8.6%

== History ==
The area of present-day Minaminowa was part of ancient Shinano Province. The village of Minamiminowa was established on April 1, 1889 by the establishment of the modern municipalities system.

== Economy ==
The economy of Minaminowa is based on agriculture, with rice, apples, blueberries and wasabi among the major crops.

== Education ==
Minamiminowa has two public elementary schools and one public middle school operated by the village government, and one high school operated the Nagano Prefectural Board of Education. The village is also host to the Agricultural Department of Shinshu University

== Transportation ==
=== Railway ===
- Central Japan Railway Company - Iida Line
  - Kitatono - Tabata

=== Highway ===
- Chūō Expressway
- National Route 153
- National Route 361
