= Minowa, Nagano =

Town in Nagano Prefecture, Japan

Minowa 箕輪町
- Town
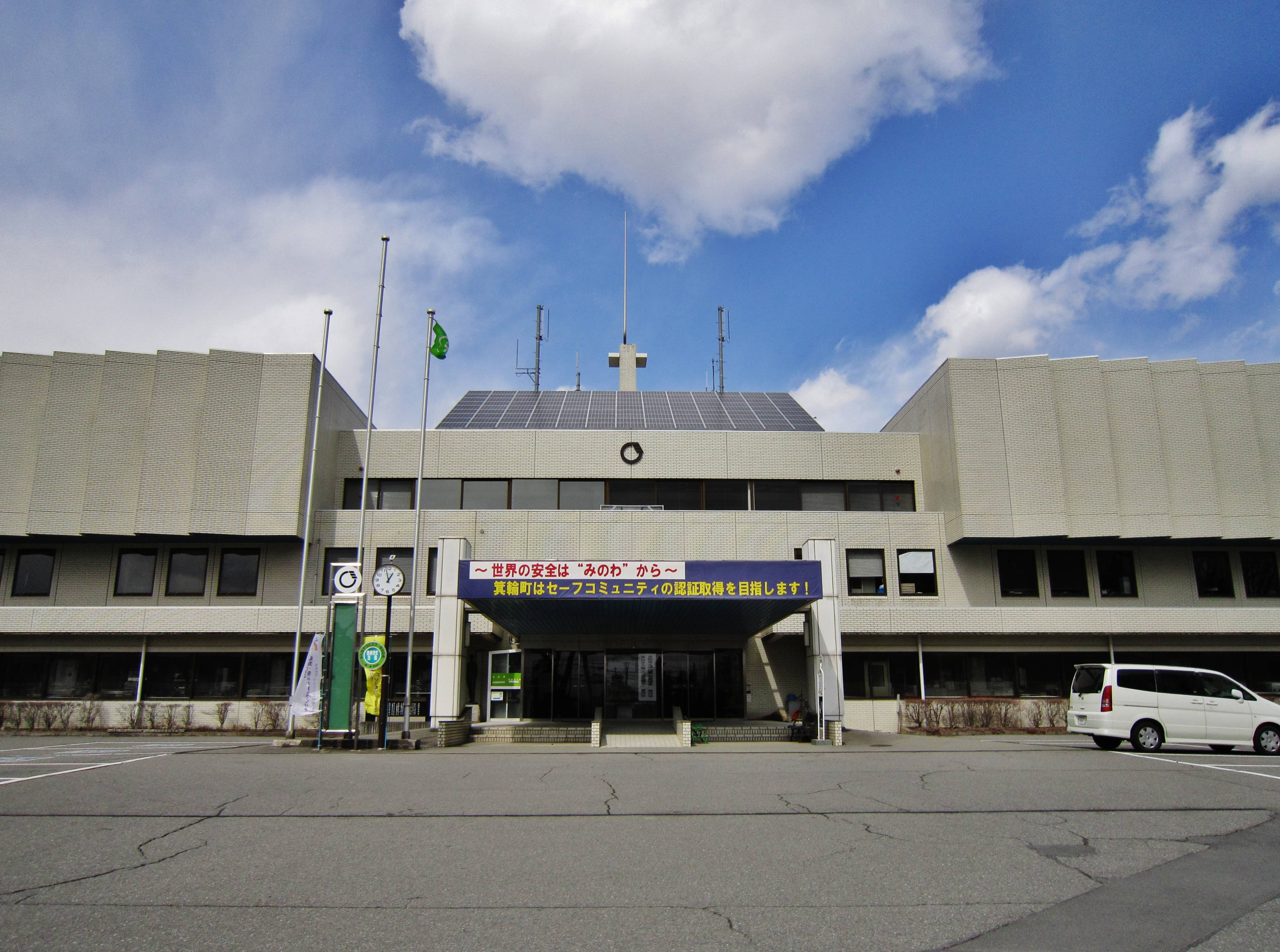
- Minowa Town Hall

- Flag Seal

- Location of Minowa in Nagano Prefecture

- Coordinates: 35°54′54.1″N 137°58′54.9″E
- Country: Japan
- Region: Chūbu (Kōshin'etsu)
- Prefecture: Nagano
- District: Kamiina

Area
  - Total: 85.91 km^{2} (33.17 sq mi)

Population (April 2019)
  - Total: 25,051
  - Density: 291.6/km^{2} (755.2/sq mi)
- Time zone: UTC+9 (Japan Standard Time)
- Symbols
  - Tree: Zelkova serrata
  - Flower: Rhododendron
  - Bird: Grey wagtail
- Phone number: 0265-79-3111
- Address: 10298 Nakaminowa, Minowa-machi, Kitaina-gun, Nagano-ken 399-4695
- Website: Official website

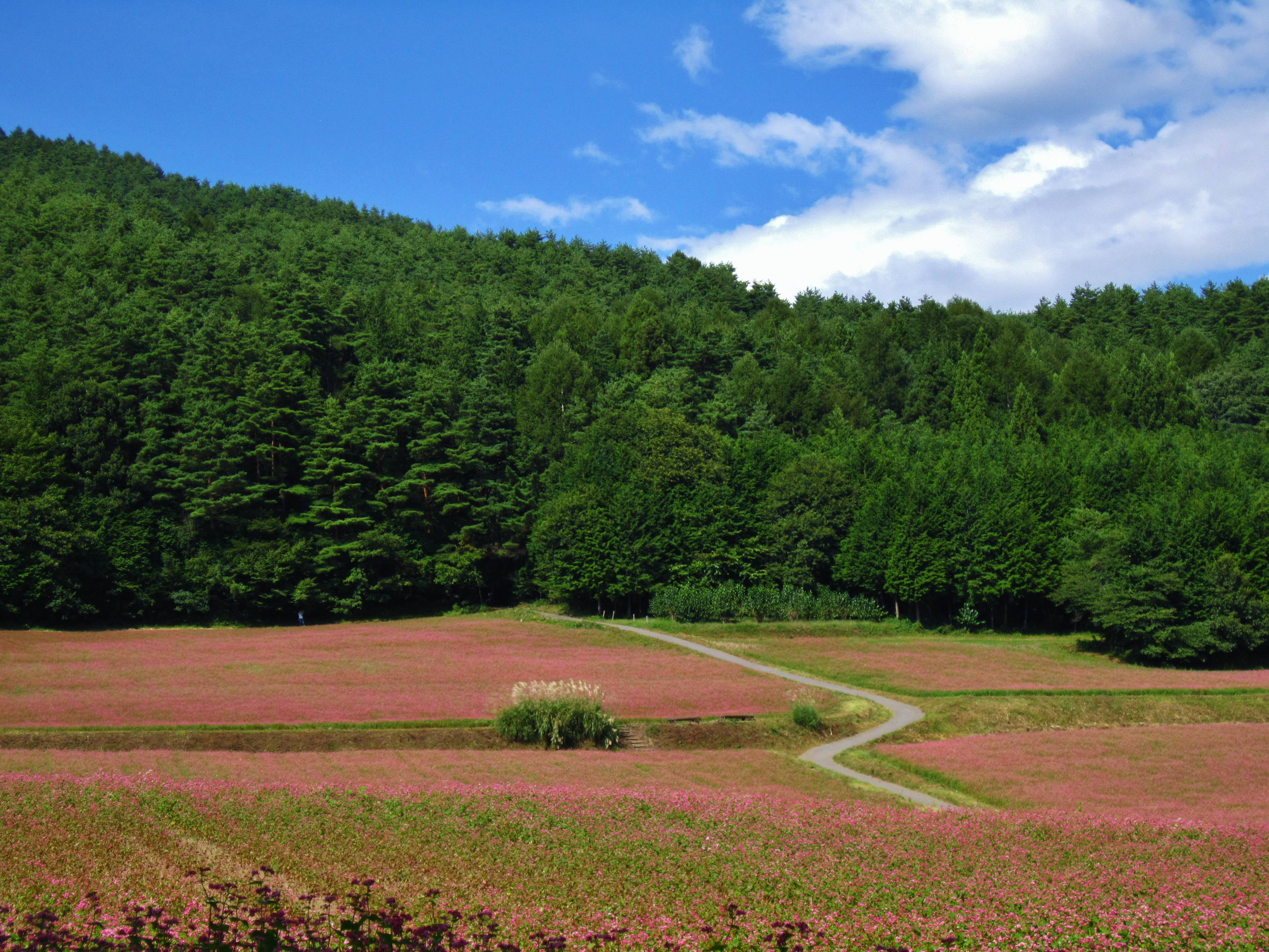
Red soba fields in Minowa

Minowa (箕輪町, Minowa-machi) is a town located in Nagano Prefecture, Japan. As of 1 April 2019, the town had an estimated population of 25,051 in 9,737 households, and a population density of 290 persons per km^{2}. The total area of the town is 85.91 square kilometres (33.17 sq mi).

== Geography ==
Minowa is located in the Ina Valley of south-central Nagano Prefecture, bordered by the Kiso Mountains to the north. The Tenryū River flows through the town. Minowa Dam is located in the town.

=== Climate ===
The town has a climate characterized by characterized by hot and humid summers, and cold winters (Köppen climate classification Cfa). The average annual temperature in Minowa is 11.4 °C. The average annual rainfall is 1342 mm with September as the wettest month. The temperatures are highest on average in August, at around 24.3 °C, and lowest in January, at around -1.0 °C.

=== Surrounding municipalities ===
- Nagano Prefecture
  - Ina
  - Minamiminowa
  - Suwa
  - Tatsuno

== Demographics ==
Per Japanese census data, the population of Minowa has recently plateaued after several decades of growth.

Historical population
Year	Pop.	±%
1940	14,161	—
1950	19,134	+35.1%
1960	17,485	−8.6%
1970	16,744	−4.2%
1980	19,729	+17.8%
1990	22,651	+14.8%
2000	25,661	+13.3%
2010	26,221	+2.2%
2020	24,989	−4.7%

== History ==
The area of present-day Minowa was part of ancient Shinano Province. The villages of Nakaminowa, Minowa and Higashiminowa were established on April 1, 1889 by the establishment of the modern municipalities system, Nakaminowa was elevated to town status on November 3, 1948. Nakaminowa, Minowa and Higashiminowa merged to form the town of Minowa on January 1, 1955.

== Education ==
Minowa has five public elementary schools and one public middle school operated by the town government, and one high school operated the Nagano Prefectural Board of Education.

=== International schools ===
- Nagano Nippaku Gakuen (former Colégio Pitágoras) - Brazilian school

== Transportation ==
=== Railway ===
- Central Japan Railway Company - Iida Line
  - Kinoshita - Ina-Matsushima - Sawa

=== Highway ===
- Chūō Expressway
- National Route 153

== Notable people from Minowa, Nagano ==
- Manabu Soya, Japanese professional wrestler
