= Kitatono Station =

Railway station in Minamiminowa, Nagano Prefecture, Japan

Kitatono Station 北殿駅
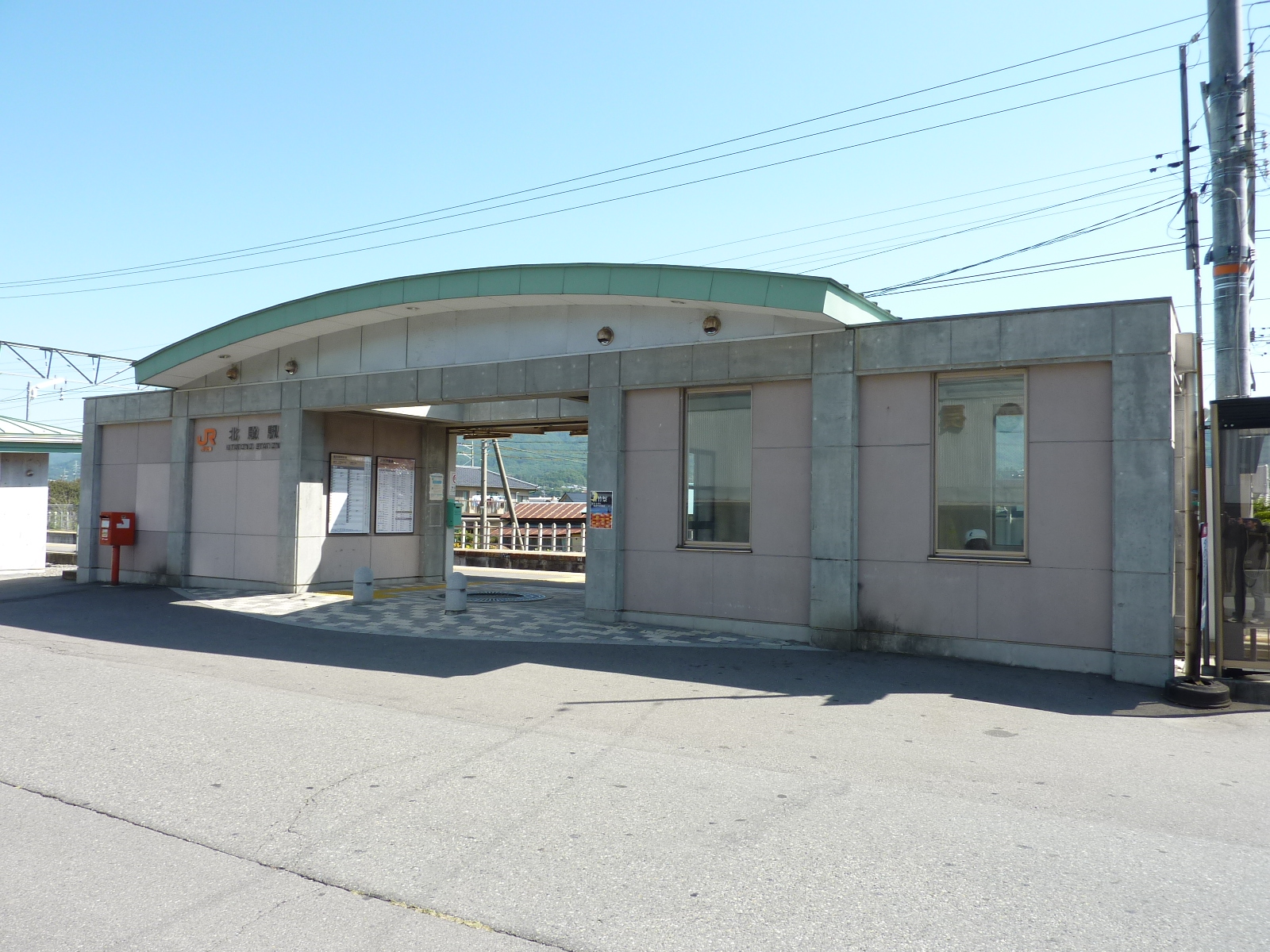
- Kitatono Station in September 2009

General information
- Location: 3718 Kitadono, Minamiminowa, Kamiina-gun, Nagano-ken 399-4511; Japan
- Coordinates: 35.8796°N 137.9841°E
- Elevation: 661 m (2,169 ft)
- Operator: JR Central
- Line: Iida Line
- Distance: 183.2 km from Toyohashi
- Platforms: 2 side platforms

Other information
- Status: Unstaffed

History
- Opened: 3 November 1911

Passengers
- FY2016: 287 daily
Location
- Location within Nagano Prefecture Location within Japan

Kitatono Station (北殿駅, Kitatono-eki) is a railway station on the Iida Line in the village of Minamiminowa, Kamiina District, Nagano Prefecture, Japan, operated by Central Japan Railway Company (JR Central).

== Lines ==
Kitatono Station is an unattended station served by the Iida Line and is 183.2 kilometers from the starting point of the line at Toyohashi Station.

== Station layout ==
The station consists of two ground-level opposed side platforms connected by a level crossing.

=== Platforms ===
1	■ Iida Line	for Tatsuno
2	■ Iida Line	for Iida and Tenryūkyō

== Adjacent stations ==
«	Service	»
Iida Line
Tabata	Rapid Misuzu	Kinoshita
Tabata	Local	Kinoshita

== History ==
Kitatono Station opened on 3 November 1911. From 1943 to 1956, the name of the station was officially pronounced "Kitadono Station". With the privatization of Japanese National Railways (JNR) on 1 April 1987, the station came under the control of JR Central. The current station building was completed in 1991.

== Passenger statistics ==
In fiscal 2016, the station was used by an average of 287 passengers daily (boarding passengers only).

== Surrounding area ==
The station is located in central Minamiminowa.

- National Route 153

== See also ==
- List of railway stations in Japan
