= Tabata Station (Nagano) =

Railway station in Minamiminowa, Nagano Prefecture, Japan

Tabata Station 田畑駅
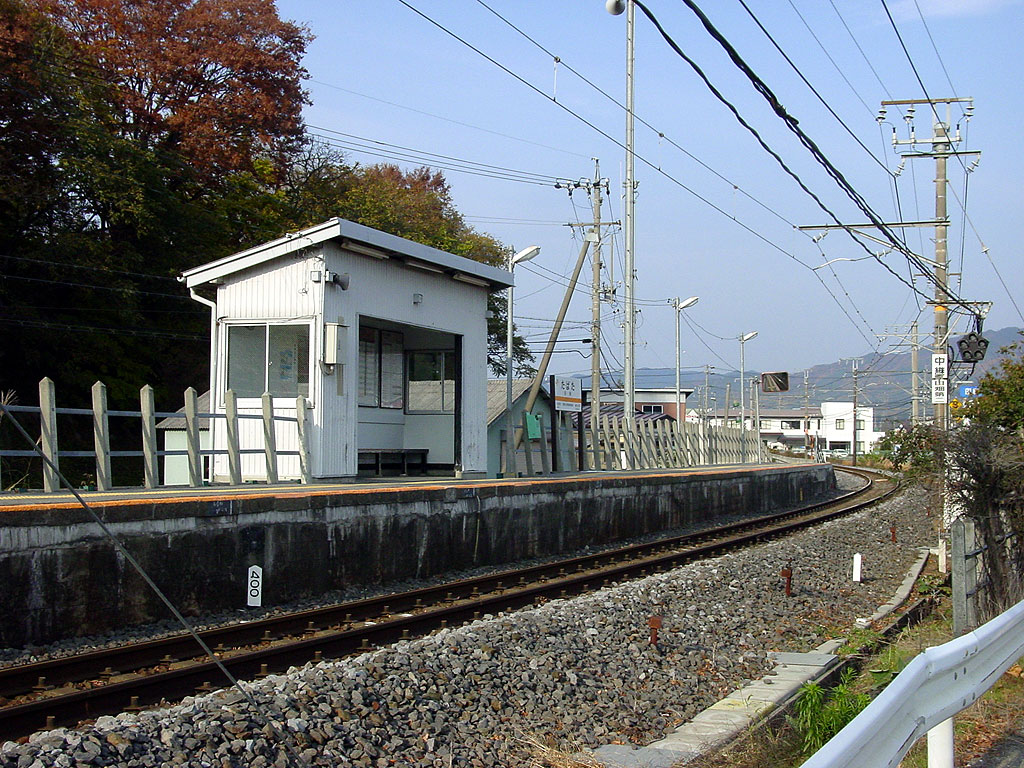
- Tabata Station in November 2005

General information
- Location: 6354 Tabata, Minamiminowa, Kamiina-gun, Nagano-ken 399-4511; Japan
- Coordinates: 35.8609°N 137.9779°E
- Elevation: 650 m (2,130 ft)
- Operator: JR Central
- Line: Iida Line
- Distance: 181.0 km from Toyohashi
- Platforms: 1 side platform

Other information
- Status: Unstaffed

History
- Opened: 3 November 1911

Passengers
- FY2016: 166 (daily)
Location
- Location within Nagano Prefecture Location within Japan

Tabata Station (田畑駅, Tabata-eki) is a railway station on the Iida Line in the village of Minamiminowa, Kamiina District Japan, operated by Central Japan Railway Company (JR Central).

== Lines ==
Tabata Station is served by the Iida Line and is 181.0 kilometers from the starting point of the line at Toyohashi Station.

== Station layout ==
The station consists of one ground-level side platform serving a single bi-directional track. There is no station building, but only a shelter built on top of the platform. The station is unattended.

== Adjacent stations ==
«	Service	»
Iida Line
Rapid Misuzu: Does not stop at this station
Inakita	Local	Kitatono

== History ==
Tabata Station opened on 3 November 1911. From 1911 to 1959, the name of the station was officially pronounced "Tahata". With the privatization of Japanese National Railways (JNR) on 1 April 1987, the station came under the control of JR Central. The current station building was completed in 1991.

== Passenger statistics ==
In fiscal 2016, the station was used by an average of 166 passengers daily (boarding passengers only).

== Surrounding area ==
- The Tenryū River flows to the east side of the station.

== See also ==
- List of railway stations in Japan
