= Nagano Prefectural Museum of History =

Museum in Chikuma, Nagano Prefecture, Japan

- 長野県立歴史館
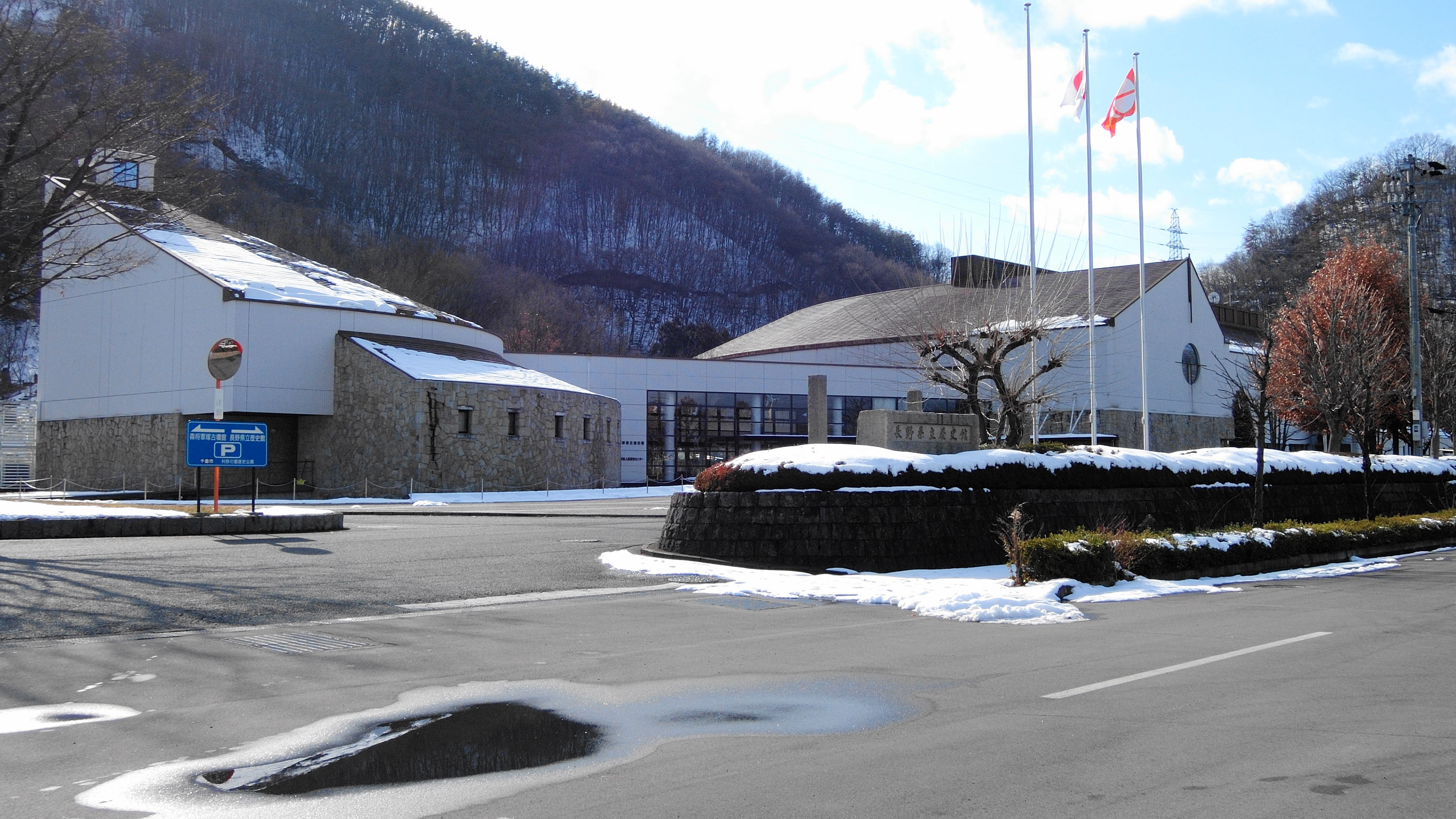
- Interactive map of the Nagano Prefectural Museum of History area

General information
- Location: 260-6 Yashiro, Chikuma, Nagano Prefecture, Japan
- Coordinates: 36°32′02″N 138°08′06″E
- Opened: 3 November 1994

Website
- Official website

Nagano Prefectural Museum of History (長野県立歴史館, Nagano Kenritsu Rekishi-kan) opened in Chikuma, Nagano Prefecture, Japan, in 1994. Its focus is the archaeology (buried cultural properties) and documentary history of Nagano Prefecture.

== See also ==
- List of Historic Sites of Japan (Nagano)
- Shinano Province
