= Suwa, Nagano =

Suwa 諏訪市
- City
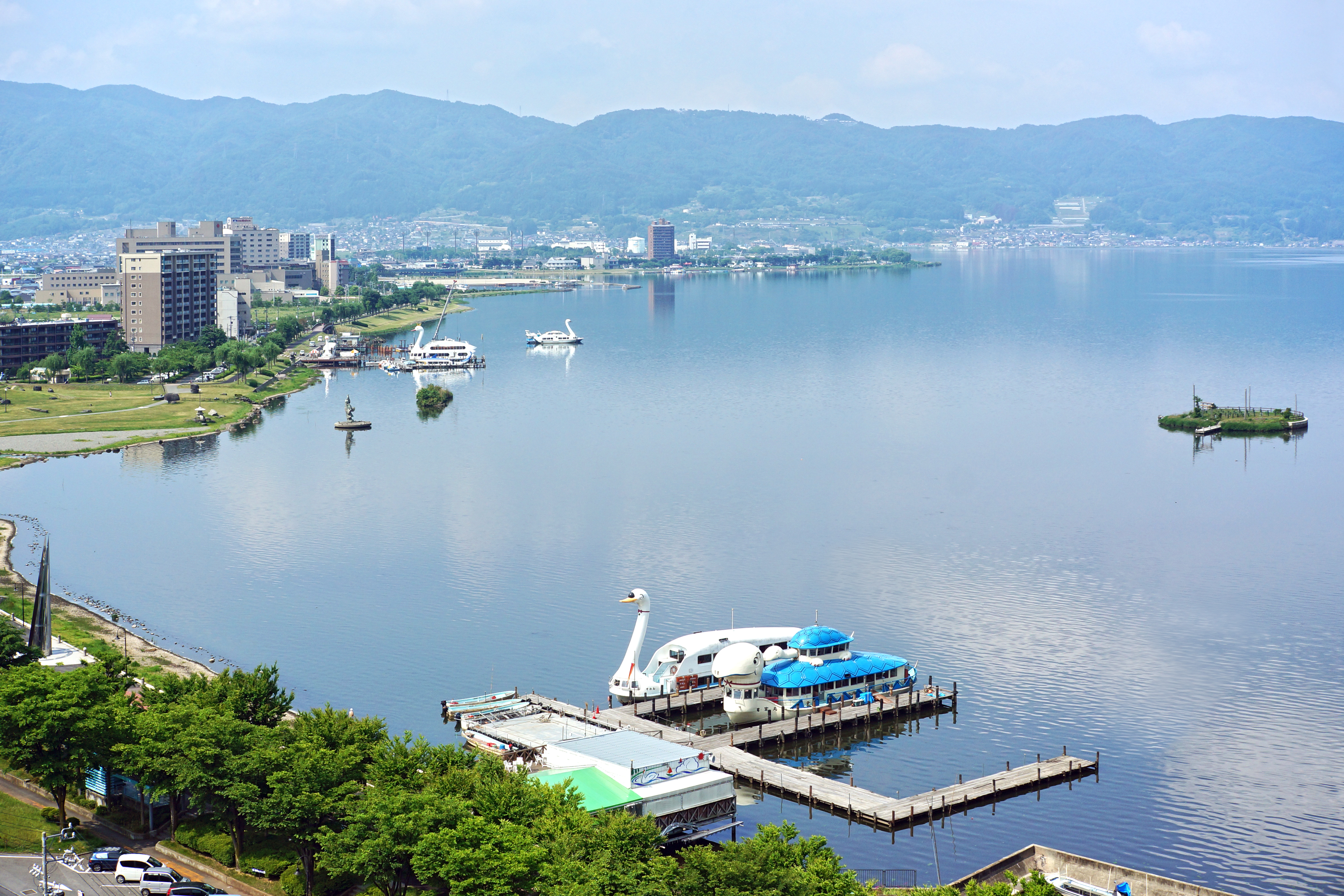
- Panorama view of Lake Suwa and Suwa Spa area

- Flag Seal

- Location of Suwa in Nagano Prefecture

- Coordinates: 36°2′20.9″N 138°6′50.5″E
- Country: Japan
- Region: Chūbu (Kōshin'etsu)
- Prefecture: Nagano

Area
  - Total: 109.17 km^{2} (42.15 sq mi)

Population (March 2019)
  - Total: 48,972
  - Density: 448.58/km^{2} (1,161.8/sq mi)
- Time zone: UTC+9 (Japan Standard Time)
- Phone number: 0266-52-4141
- Address: 1-22-30 Takashima, Suwa-shi, Nagano-ken 392-8511
- Climate: Cfa/Dfa
- Website: Official website
- Symbols
- Flower: Hemerocallis esculenta, Iris
- Tree: Phellodendron amurense, Pseudocydonia

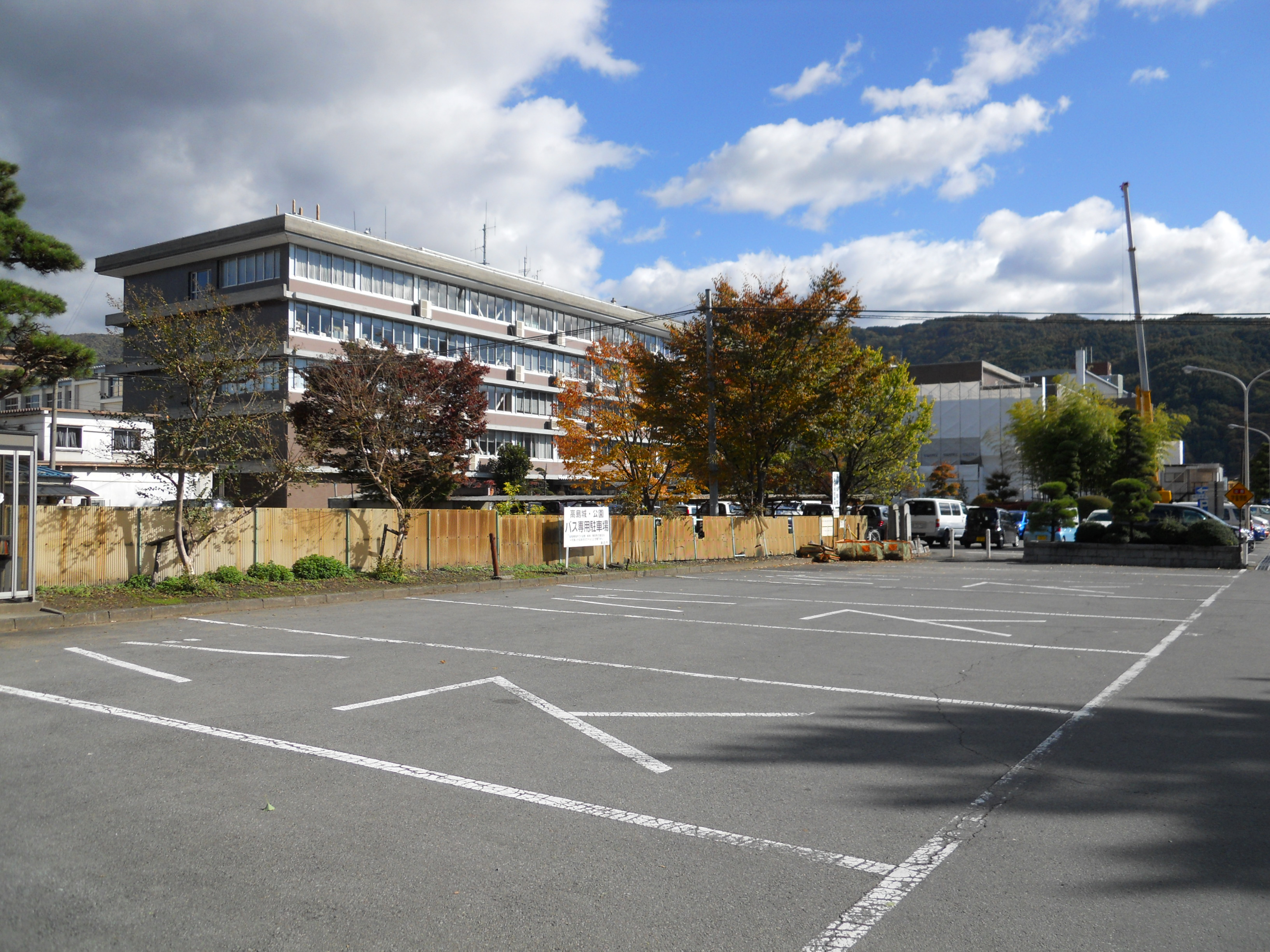
Suwa City Hall

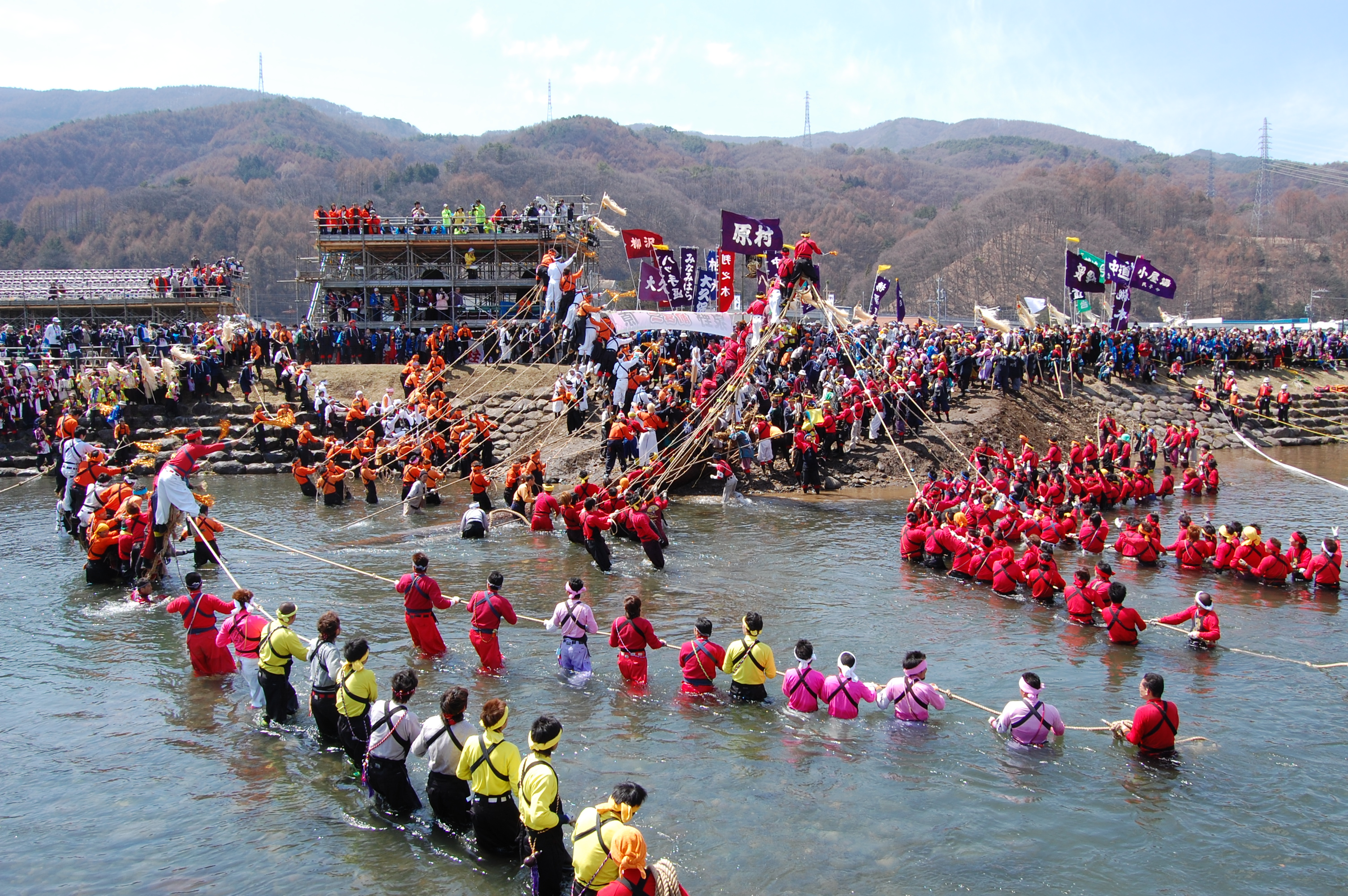
Onbashira in Suwa-taisha, which is held once every six years

Suwa (諏訪市, Suwa-shi; Japanese pronunciation: [sɨ̀.β̞ä́(.ɕì), sɨ́.β̞ä̀]) is a city located in Nagano Prefecture, Japan. As of 1 March 2019, the city had an estimated population of 48,972 in 20698 households, and a population density of 452 persons per km². The total area of the city is 109.17 square kilometres (42.15 sq mi).

== History ==
The shores of Lake Suwa have been inhabited since at least the Japanese Paleolithic period. The Suwa clan ruled the area from the Nara period onward, and the area developed as a castle town for Suwa Domain during the Edo period Tokugawa shogunate and as a post station on the Kōshū Kaidō highway. In the post-Meiji restoration cadastral reforms of April 1, 1889, the village of Kamisuwa was established. Kamisuwa was elevated to town status on April 20, 1891. After merger with the villages of Shiga and Toyoda (from Suwa District), Kamisuwa was elevated to city status on August 10, 1941, changing its name to Suwa.

== Geography ==
Suwa is located in central Nagano Prefecture, bordered on the north and west by Lake Suwa, approximately 100 kilometers south of the prefectural capital of Nagano city, and two hours by car from either central Tokyo or Nagoya.

=== Surrounding municipalities ===
- Nagano Prefecture
  - Chino
  - Ina
  - Minowa
  - Nagawa
  - Okaya
  - Shimosuwa
  - Tatsuno

== Climate ==
The city has a climate characterized by characterized by hot and humid summers, and relatively mild but cold winters (Köppen climate classification Dfa). The average annual temperature in Suwa is 11.4 °C (52.5 °F). The average annual rainfall is 1,301.5 mm (51.24 in) with July as the wettest month. The temperatures are highest on average in August, at around 24.1 °C (75.4 °F), and lowest in January, at around −1.1 °C (30.0 °F).

Climate data for Suwa (1991–2020 normals, extremes 1945–present)
Month	Jan	Feb	Mar	Apr	May	Jun	Jul	Aug	Sep	Oct	Nov	Dec	Year
Record high °C (°F)	16.9 (62.4)	18.1 (64.6)	24.9 (76.8)	29.2 (84.6)	31.0 (87.8)	34.5 (94.1)	34.8 (94.6)	35.5 (95.9)	33.2 (91.8)	29.0 (84.2)	22.9 (73.2)	19.7 (67.5)	35.5 (95.9)
Mean daily maximum °C (°F)	3.8 (38.8)	5.1 (41.2)	9.8 (49.6)	16.1 (61.0)	21.5 (70.7)	24.5 (76.1)	28.2 (82.8)	29.5 (85.1)	24.7 (76.5)	18.5 (65.3)	12.7 (54.9)	6.8 (44.2)	16.8 (62.2)
Daily mean °C (°F)	−1.1 (30.0)	−0.2 (31.6)	4.0 (39.2)	10.0 (50.0)	15.5 (59.9)	19.3 (66.7)	23.2 (73.8)	24.1 (75.4)	19.8 (67.6)	13.4 (56.1)	7.3 (45.1)	1.9 (35.4)	11.4 (52.5)
Mean daily minimum °C (°F)	−5.5 (22.1)	−5.0 (23.0)	−1.0 (30.2)	4.4 (39.9)	10.2 (50.4)	15.2 (59.4)	19.6 (67.3)	20.3 (68.5)	16.2 (61.2)	9.4 (48.9)	2.7 (36.9)	−2.4 (27.7)	7.0 (44.6)
Record low °C (°F)	−20.9 (−5.6)	−23.1 (−9.6)	−16.5 (2.3)	−7.3 (18.9)	−0.7 (30.7)	4.1 (39.4)	10.3 (50.5)	9.7 (49.5)	2.7 (36.9)	−2.4 (27.7)	−7.0 (19.4)	−15.6 (3.9)	−23.1 (−9.6)
Average precipitation mm (inches)	43.3 (1.70)	50.6 (1.99)	89.0 (3.50)	92.8 (3.65)	111.7 (4.40)	155.1 (6.11)	194.0 (7.64)	140.8 (5.54)	176.9 (6.96)	136.8 (5.39)	69.0 (2.72)	41.6 (1.64)	1,301.5 (51.24)
Average snowfall cm (inches)	27 (11)	24 (9.4)	8 (3.1)	1 (0.4)	0 (0)	0 (0)	0 (0)	0 (0)	0 (0)	0 (0)	0 (0)	10 (3.9)	71 (28)
Average precipitation days (≥ 0.5 mm)	6.3	6.3	9.3	10.0	10.5	13.2	14.4	11.8	11.6	9.3	7.6	6.4	116.8
Average snowy days	15.1	12.1	8.7	1.9	0.0	0.0	0.0	0.0	0.0	0.0	1.4	10.3	50.3
Average relative humidity (%)	71	69	66	64	67	74	77	75	78	78	75	72	72
Mean monthly sunshine hours	184.4	179.6	199.1	204.4	212.2	161.4	169.5	199.4	152.9	162.8	166.9	171.8	2,164.8
Source: Japan Meteorological Agency (1991–2020 normals, extremes 1945–present)

== Demographics ==
Per Japanese census data, the population of Suwa peaked around the year 2000 and has declined since.

Historical population
Year	Pop.	±%
1940	37,547	—
1950	42,693	+13.7%
1960	44,035	+3.1%
1970	48,125	+9.3%
1980	50,558	+5.1%
1990	52,464	+3.8%
2000	53,858	+2.7%
2010	51,211	−4.9%
2020	48,729	−4.8%

== Government ==
Suwa has a mayor-council form of government with a directly elected mayor and a unicameral city legislature of 15 members.

== Economy ==
The Suwa region is the leading industrial area of Nagano and was once known as "The Oriental Switzerland" in Japan for its highly developed precision machinery industry. Seiko Epson Corporation, a manufacturer of information-related equipment and Seiko timepieces, is headquartered in Suwa. The area is also a popular tourist destination, noted for its hot spring resorts.

== Education ==
Suwa has seven public elementary schools and four public middle schools operated by the city government, and two public high schools and one combined middle/high school operated by the Nagano Prefectural Board of Education. The Japanese Red Cross Society Suwa School of Nursing is also located in the city.

Colégio Sal e Luz, a Brazilian school, was previously located in Suwa. It moved to Okaya.

== Transportation ==
=== Railway ===
- East Japan Railway Company - Chūō Main Line
  - Kami-Suwa

=== Highway ===
- Chūō Expressway
- National Route 20

== Sister cities ==
Suwa is twinned with:

- - Amboise, France, sister city since March 4, 1987
- - Kundl, Tirol, Austria
- (United States) - St. Louis, Missouri, US, sister city since September 23, 1974
- - Wörgl, Tirol, Austria

== Local attractions ==
- Onbashira (literally, "the honored log") festival held every six years (in the years of the Tiger and the Monkey). As part of the event, very large trees up in the hills are felled and brought down into the valley, pulling them with ropes and sliding them down hills. To demonstrate their bravery, young men from the area ride on the logs as they hurtle down the slopes.
- Sunritz Hattori Museum of Arts
- Takashima Castle (高島城 Takashima-jō). The castle is also known as ’The Floating Castle of Suwa’ (諏訪の浮城 Suwa-no-uki-shirō) or Shimazaki Castle (島崎城 Shimazaki-jō).

== In popular media ==
Suwa forms the backdrop for much of Sayo Masuda's Autobiography of a Geisha.

The characters Sanae Kochiya, Kanako Yasaka, and Suwako Moriya in the Touhou Project originate from this area.

== Notable people ==
- Sakuhei Fujiwhara, meteorologist
- George Iida, movie director, author
- Mari Kaneko, female karateka and mixed martial arts fighter
- Akira Kinoshita, photographer
- Kenichi Mikawa, singer
- Tetsuzan Nagata, general in the Imperial Japanese Army
- Paul Tsuchihashi, priest and academic

== See also ==
- Lake Suwa
