= Japan National Route 20 =

Highway in Japan

National Route 20
- 国道20号

Route information
- Length: 225.0 km (139.8 mi)
- Existed: 4 December 1952–present

Major junctions
- South end: National Route 1 / National Route 4 / National Route 6 / National Route 14 / National Route 15 / National Route 17 in Nihonbashi, Chūō, Tokyo
- North end: National Route 19 / National Route 153 in Shiojiri, Nagano

Location
- Country: Japan
- Major cities: Hachiōji; Kofu

Highway system
- National highways of Japan; Expressways of Japan
← National Route 19	→ National Route 21

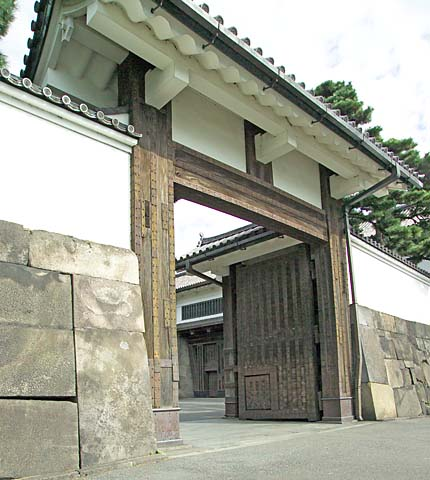
The Sakurada Gate of the Imperial Palace. Ii Naosuke was assassinated outside this gate.

National Route 20 (国道20号, Kokudō nijū-gō) is a national highway connecting Tokyo and Shiojiri, Nagano prefecture in Japan. Originating at Nihonbashi in Chūō, Tokyo, it passes through Shinjuku and four other wards, and then seven cities, including Hachiōji in Tokyo. It follows a westward route into Kanagawa Prefecture, passing through the city of Sagamihara and one town. Continuing into Yamanashi Prefecture, the highway passes through nine cities and towns, among them the prefectural capital of Kofu. In Nagano Prefecture, National Route 20 passes through five cities and towns before entering Shiojiri, where it terminates at the intersection of National Routes 19 and 153. The highway is 225.0 km long.

National Route 20 is the successor to the Kōshū Kaidō, an Edo period highway connecting the shogunal capital of Edo and Kofu, then the principal city in Kai Province (or Kōshū, as it was also known). Parts of it still bear the old name.

The highway's course passes the Sakurada Gate of the Tokyo Imperial Palace. Shinjuku Station is on National Route 20. The marathon course of the Tokyo Olympics included parts of National Route 20.

== History ==
- 4 December 1952 - First Class National Highway 20 (from Tokyo to Shiojiri, Nagano)
- 1 April 1965 - General National Highway 20 (from Tokyo to Shiojiri, Nagano)

== Overlapping sections ==
- From Nihonbashi to Chiyoda (Sakuradamon intersection): Route 1
- In Hachioji, from Yokamachi intersection to Hachimancho intersection: Route 16
- In Otsuki, from intersection to Otsuki-bashi east intersection: Route 139
- From Kai (Ryuo-rittai intersection) to Nirasaki (Funayama-bashi kita intersection): Route 52

== Intersects with ==
- Tokyo
  - Routes 4 and 15; at the origin, in Nihonbashi (Route 4 overlaps with 6, 14 and 17)
  - Route 1; from Nihonbashi to Chiyoda
  - Route 246; at Chiyoda
  - Chofu IC, Chuo Expressway at Chōfu
  - Kunitachi-Fuchu IC, Chuo Expressway at Kunitachi
  - Route 16; at Hachioji
- Kanagawa Prefecture
  - Route 412 and Sagamiko-Higashi Exit, Chuo Expressway; at Sagamihara
  - Sagamiko IC, Chuo Expressway at Sagamihara
- Yamanashi Prefecture
  - Route 139 and Otsuki IC, Chuo Expressway; at Otsuki
  - Route 137; at Fuefuki
  - Routes 140 and 358; at Kofu
  - Route 52; from Kai to Nirasaki
  - Route 141; at Nirasaki
- Nagano Prefecture
  - Routes 152 and 299; at Chino
  - Route 142; at Shimosuwa
  - Routes 19 and 153; at the terminus, in Shiojiri
