= E52 =

E52 may refer to:

- BMW E52, an automobile platform was the basis for the 2000 through 2004 Z8 convertible sports car
- HMS E52, a 1915 British E class submarine
- Nokia E52, a smartphone from the Nokia Eseries range
- Shin-Tōmei Expressway (Shimizu Spur road) and Chūbu-Ōdan Expressway (includes concurrency section with Chūō Expressway), route E52 in Japan
