= Japan National Route 138 =

National highway in Japan

National Route 138
- 国道138号
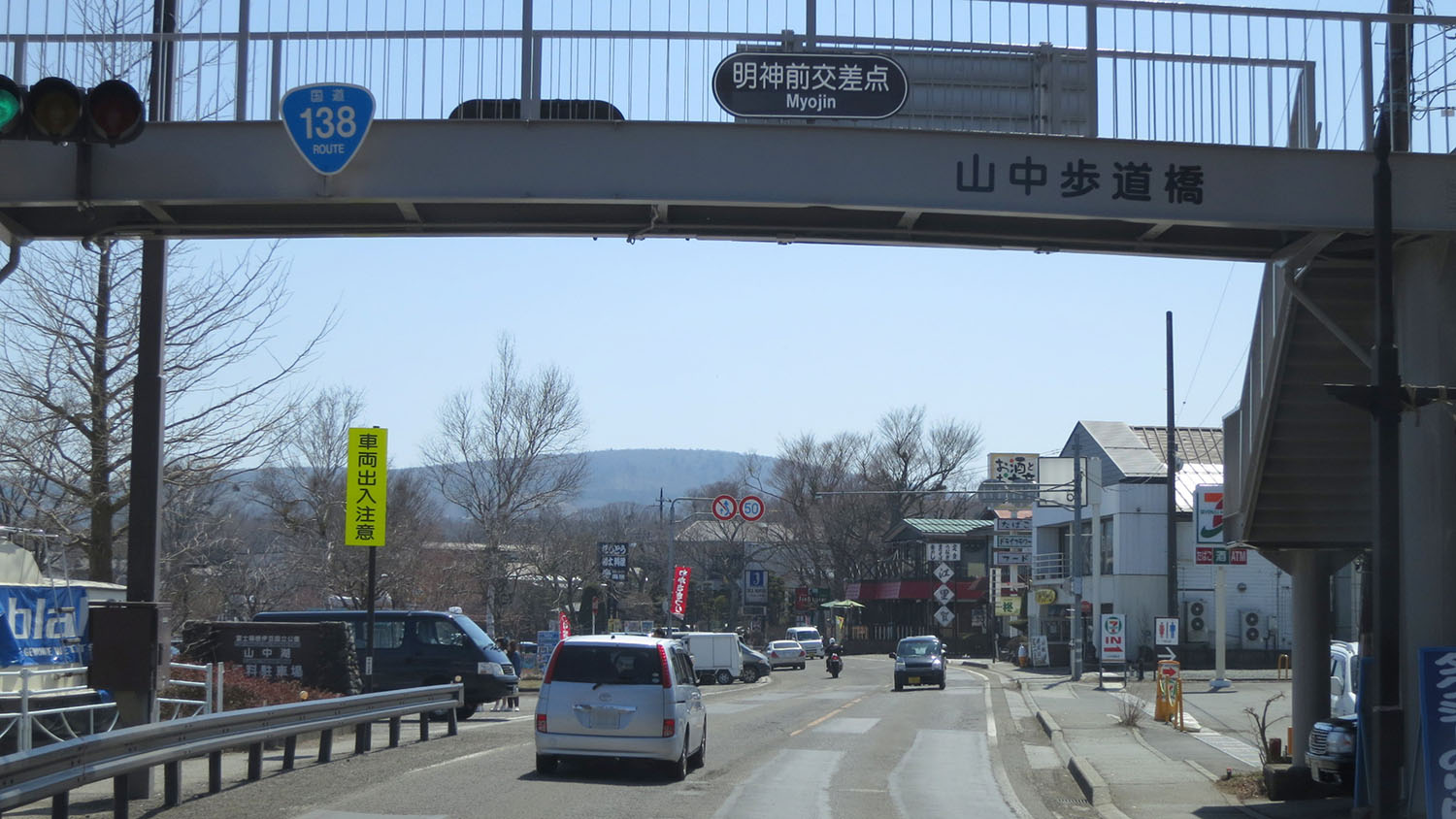

Route information
- Length: 61.4 km (38.2 mi)
- Existed: 1953–present

Major junctions
- West end: National Route 137 / National Route 139 in Fujiyoshida, Yamanashi
- East end: National Route 1 / National Route 255 in Odawara, Kanagawa

Location
- Country: Japan

Highway system
- National highways of Japan; Expressways of Japan
← National Route 137	→ National Route 139

National Route 138 is a national highway of Japan connecting Fujiyoshida, Yamanashi and Odawara, Kanagawa in Japan, with a total length of 61.4 km (38.15 mi).

== Route description ==
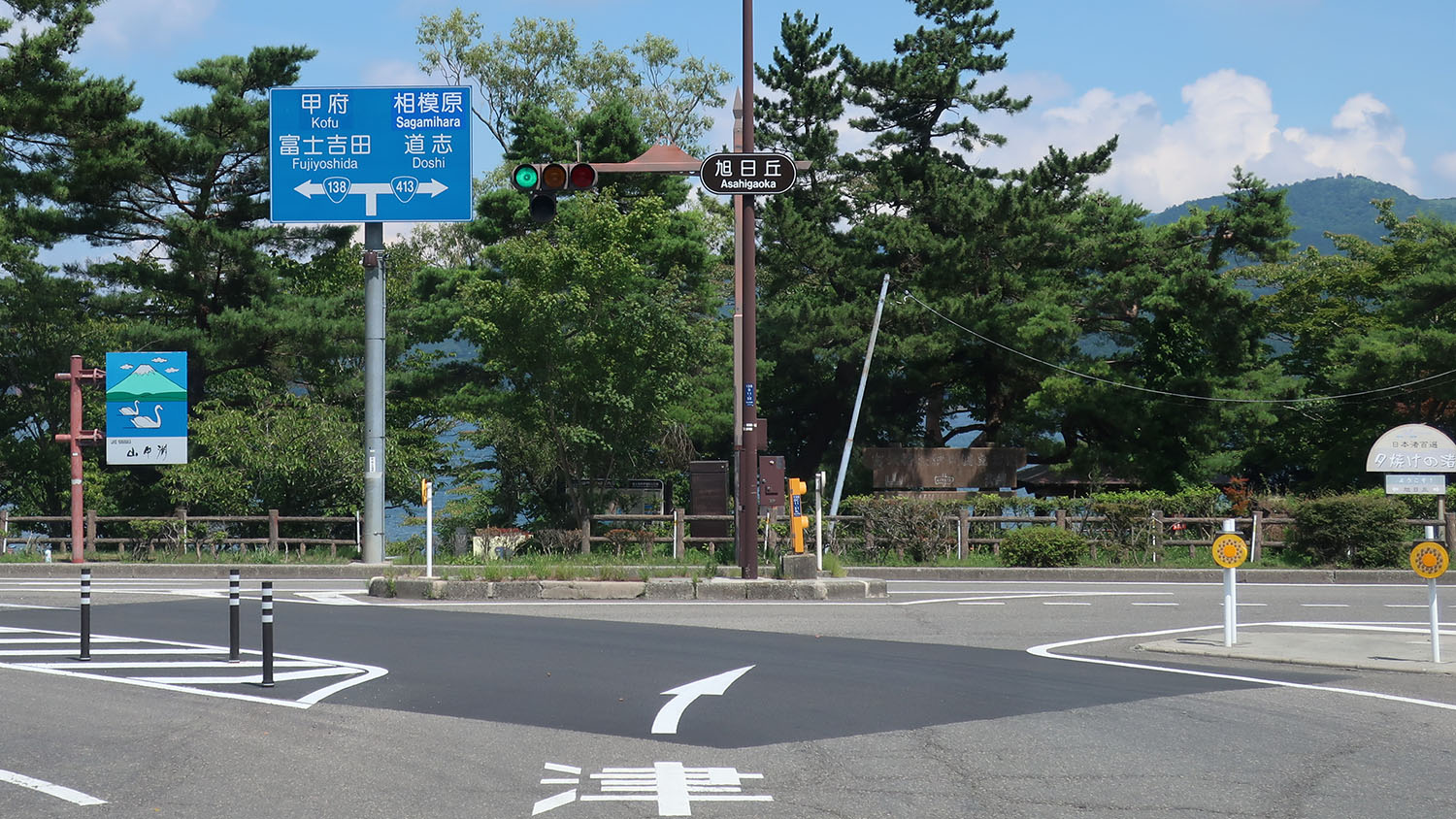
National Route 138 at a junction with National Route 413 on the southern shore of Lake Yamanaka

The highway connects Odawara in the western side of Kanagawa Prefecture to Fujiyoshida, a city on the northern side of Mount Fuji in Yamanashi Prefecture. From its eastern terminus at National Routes 1 and 255 in Odawara, the road travels west to the eastern limit of Fuji-Hakone-Izu National Park. The highway travels through the northern portion of the park, exiting it at its northwestern corner. Next the highway has a junction with the Tōmei Expressway in Gotemba. It then travels across the city and then enters the neighboring town, Oyama. In Oyama, the road has a junction with Higashifuji-goko Road. It then hugs the southern shore of Lake Yamanaka, the largest of the Fuji Five Lakes before crossing into Fujiyoshida where it meets its western terminus at an intersection with National Route 137.

== List of major junctions ==
Prefecture	Location	km	mi	Destinations	Notes
Yamanashi	Fujiyoshida	0.0	0.0	National Route 139 / National Route 137 / National Route 300 / National Route 413	Western terminus; only National Routes 138 and 139 are signed; western end of National Route 413 concurrency
Yamanashi	Fujiyoshida	1.7	1.1	National Route 139 (Fujimi Bypass)	
Yamanashi	Yamanakako	6.3	3.9	Higashifuji-goko Road	E68 exit 4 (Yamanakako Interchange)
Yamanashi	Yamanakako	7.2	4.5	Yamanashi Prefecture Route 717 north	
Yamanashi	Yamanakako	7.8	4.8	Yamanashi Prefecture Route 729 east	
Yamanashi	Yamanakako	11.2	7.0	National Route 413 east	Eastern end of National Route 413 concurrency
Shizuoka	Oyama	19.3	12.0	Higashifuji-goko Road north	E68 exit 5 (Subashiri Interchange)
Shizuoka	Oyama	20.5	12.7	Shizuoka Prefecture Route 150 north	Interchange; western end of Shizuoka Prefecture Route 150 concurrency
Shizuoka	Oyama	21.8	13.5	Shizuoka Prefecture Route 150 east	Eastern end of Shizuoka Prefecture Route 150 concurrency
Shizuoka	Gotemba	25.8	16.0	National Route 469 west	
Shizuoka	Gotemba	26.4	16.4	Shizuoka Prefecture Route 401 east	
Shizuoka	Gotemba	27.8	17.3	National Route 246 (Susono Bypass)	Interchange
Shizuoka	Gotemba	30.4	18.9	Tōmei Expressway	E1 exit 7 (Gotenba Interchange)
Shizuoka	Gotemba	32.0	19.9	Shizuoka Prefecture Route 401 west	Western end of Shizuoka Prefecture Route 401 concurrency
Shizuoka	Gotemba	33.5	20.8	Shizuoka Prefecture Route 401 south	Eastern end of Shizuoka Prefecture Route 401 concurrency
Kanagawa	Hakone	38.7	24.0	Kanagawa Prefecture Route 736 south	
Kanagawa	Hakone	40.9	25.4	Kanagawa Prefecture Route 731 north	
Kanagawa	Hakone	41.2	25.6	Kanagawa Prefecture Route 75 south – Moto-Hakone, Lake Ashi	
Kanagawa	Hakone	48.2	30.0	Kanagawa Prefecture Route 723 west – Gōra, Ni-no-Taira	
Kanagawa	Hakone	49.4	30.7	National Route 1 west (Tōkaidō) – Numazu, Moto-Hakone	Western end of National Route 1 concurrency
Kanagawa	Hakone	56.1	34.9	Kanagawa Prefecture Route 732 west – Hatajuku	
Kanagawa	Hakone	56.6	35.2	National Route 1 (Hakone Shindō / Odawara-Hakone Road) – Numazu, Yokohama	Yamazaki Interchange
Kanagawa	Odawara	58.2	36.2	Seishō Bypass – Odawara-Atsugi Road	Hakoneguchi Interchange
Kanagawa	Odawara	60.2	37.4	National Route 135 south – Atami, Yugawara / Kanagawa Prefectural Route 73 north – Odawara Station	
Kanagawa	Odawara	61.4	38.2	National Route 1 east (Tōkaidō) / National Route 255 north – Matsuda, Odawara Station, Yokohama, Hiratsuka	Eastern terminus; eastern end of National Route 1 concurrency
1.000 mi = 1.609 km; 1.000 km = 0.621 mi: Concurrency terminus
