= Fujiyoshida =

City in Yamanashi (prefecture), Japan

Fujiyoshida 富士吉田市
- City
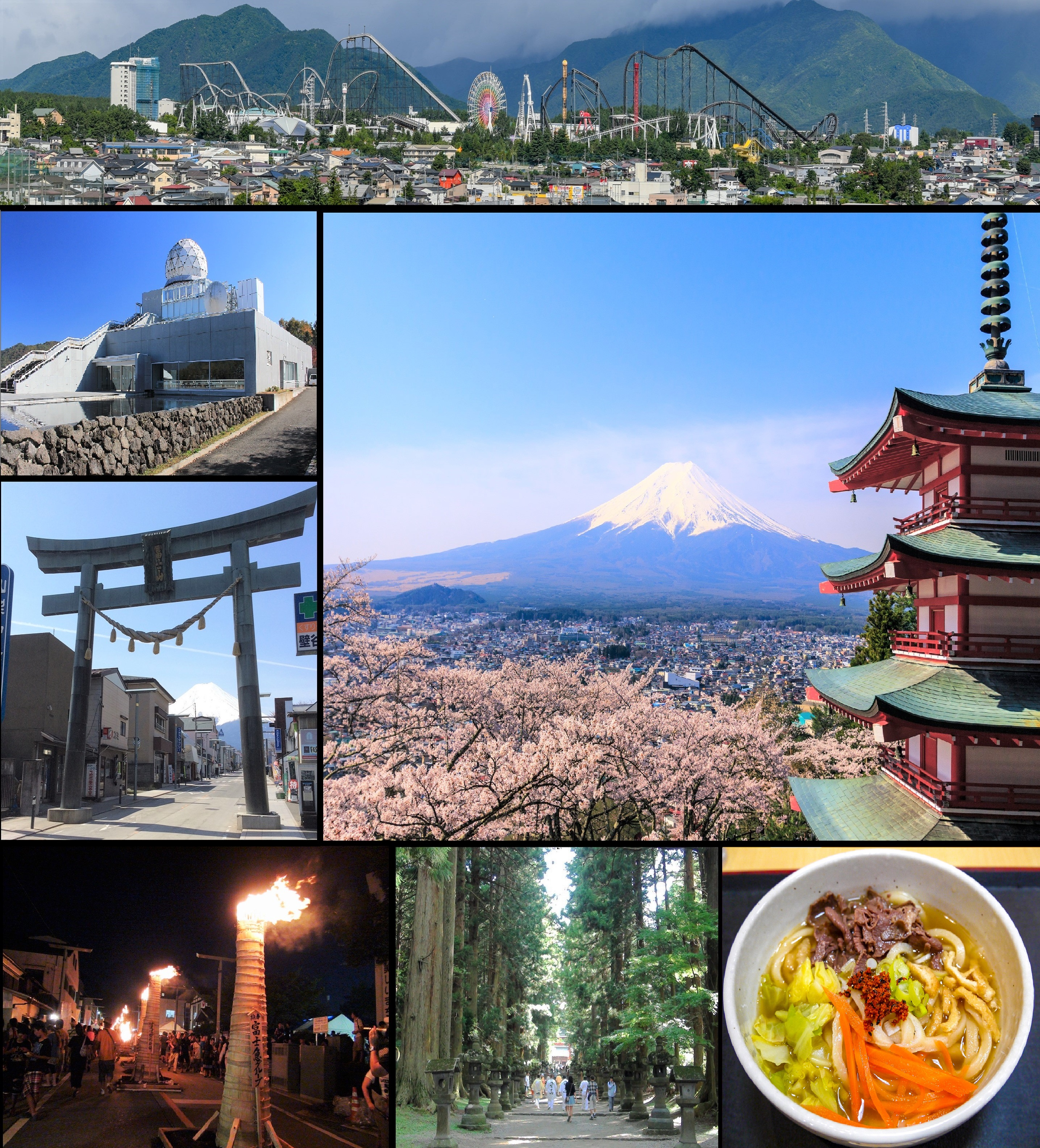
- Fujiyoshida montage, Top: Fuji-Q Highland amusement park, Middle above left: Mount Fuji Radar Dome, Middle row left: Gold Torii Gate, Middle right: Mount Fuji and a pagoda in Arakurayama Sengen Park, Bottom left: Fujiyoshida Firework Festival, Bottom middle: a Tree-lined road in Fuji Sengen Shrine, Bottom right: Yoshida Udon Noodle

- Flag Seal

- Location of Fujiyoshida in Yamanashi Prefecture

- Coordinates: 35°29′15.1″N 138°48′27.9″E
- Country: Japan
- Region: Chūbu (Tōkai)
- Prefecture: Yamanashi Prefecture
- First official recorded: 2nd century BC (official)
- Shimoyoshida town settled: August 1, 1939
- Current name changed and city settled: March 20, 1951

Government
  - Mayor: Shigeru Horiuchi

Area
  - Total: 121.74 km^{2} (47.00 sq mi)

Population (October 1, 2020)
  - Total: 46,530
  - Density: 382.2/km^{2} (989.9/sq mi)
- Time zone: UTC+9 (Japan Standard Time)
- City symbols
  - Tree: White birch
  - Flower: Fujizakura
  - Bird: Great spotted woodpecker
- Phone number: 0555-22-1111
- Address: 6-1-1 Shimoyoshida, Fujiyoshida-shi, Yamanashi-ken 403-8601
- Website: Official website

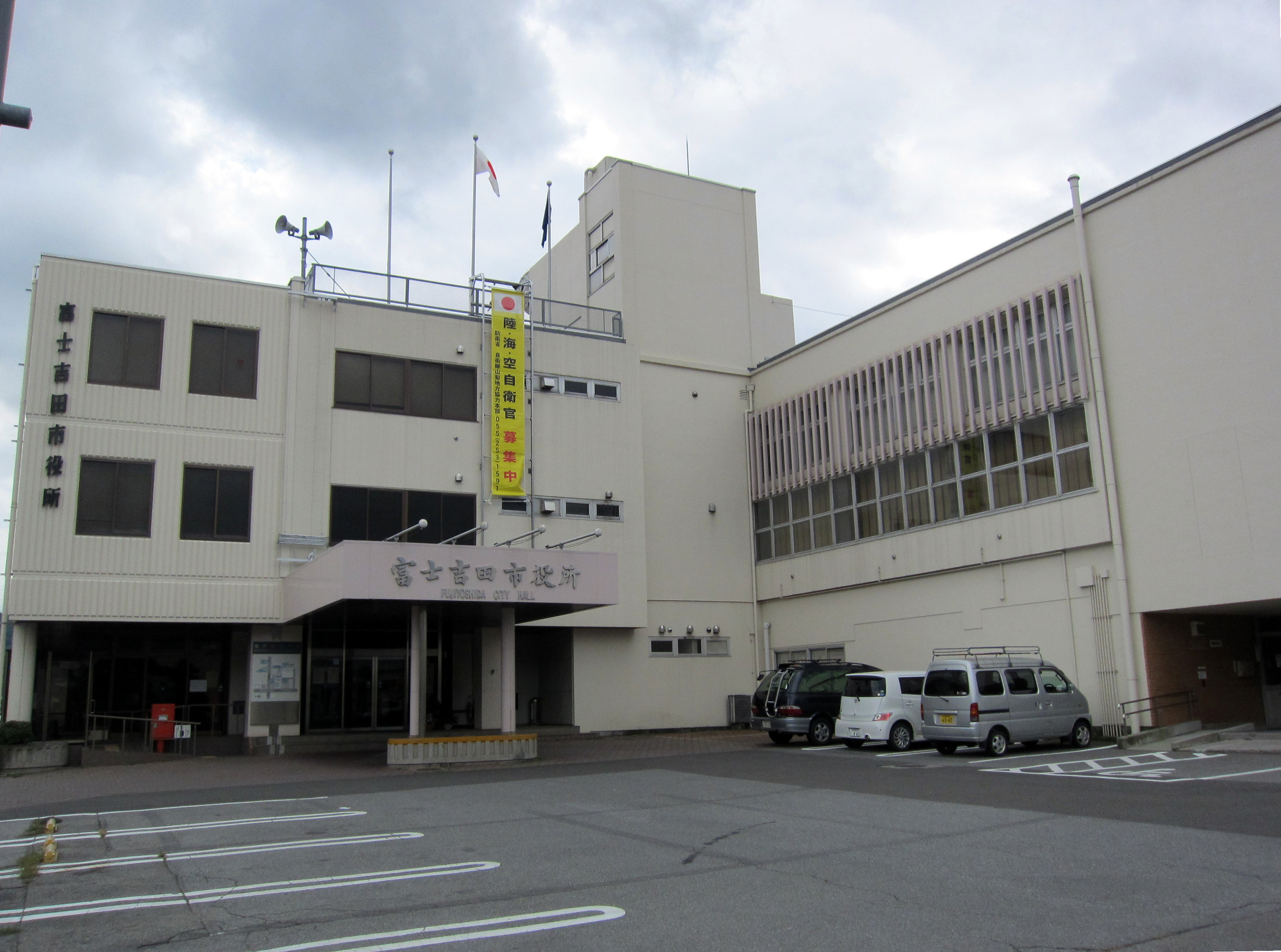
Fujiyoshida City Hall

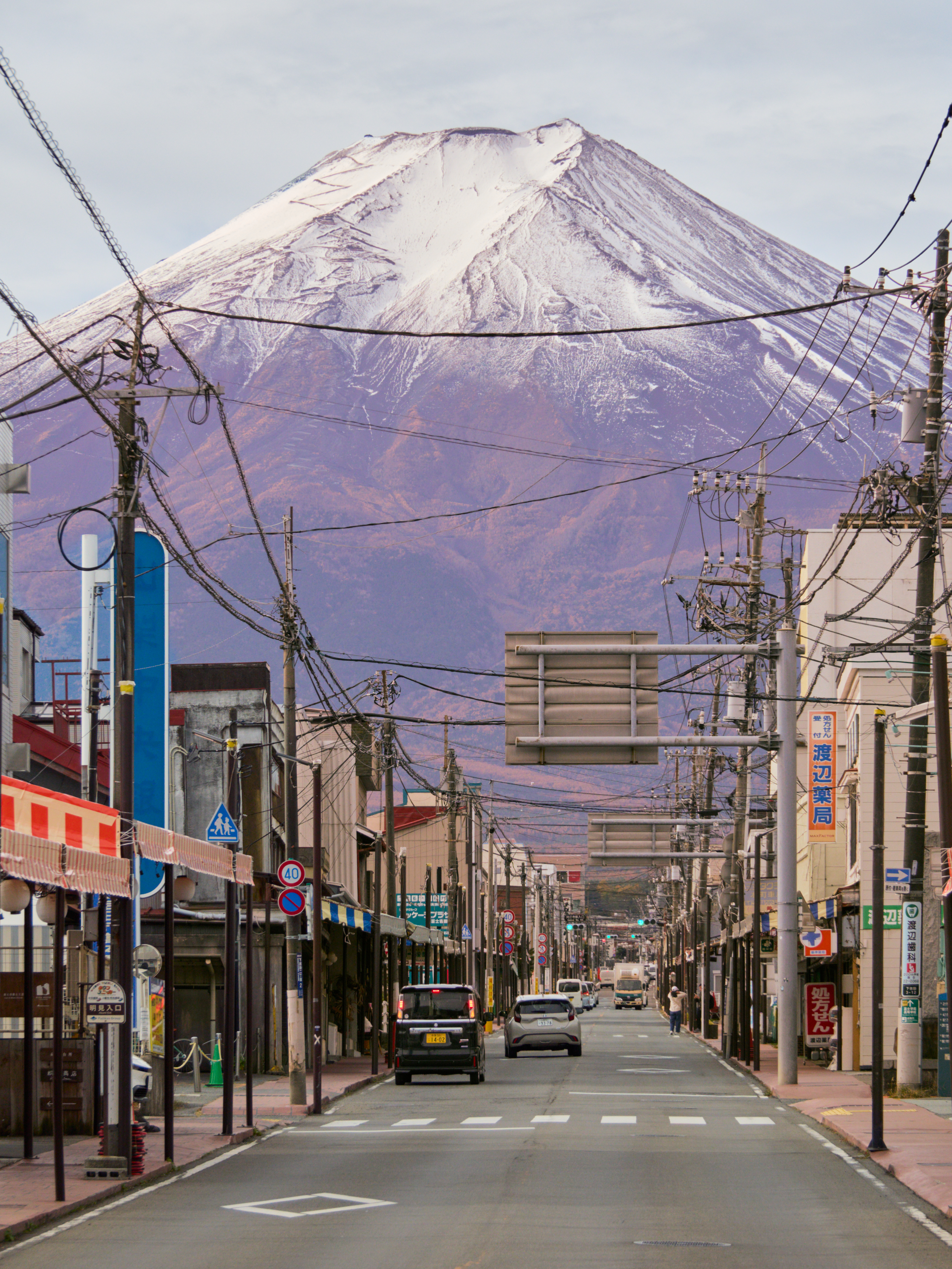
A street in Fujiyoshida with Mount Fuji visible at the end of the road.

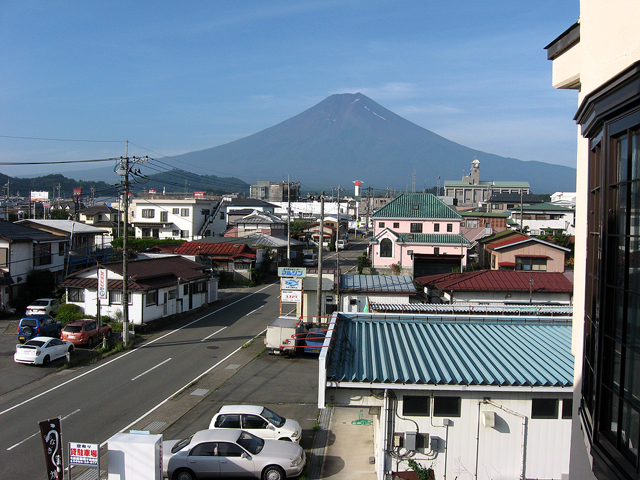
Fujiyoshida city looking south

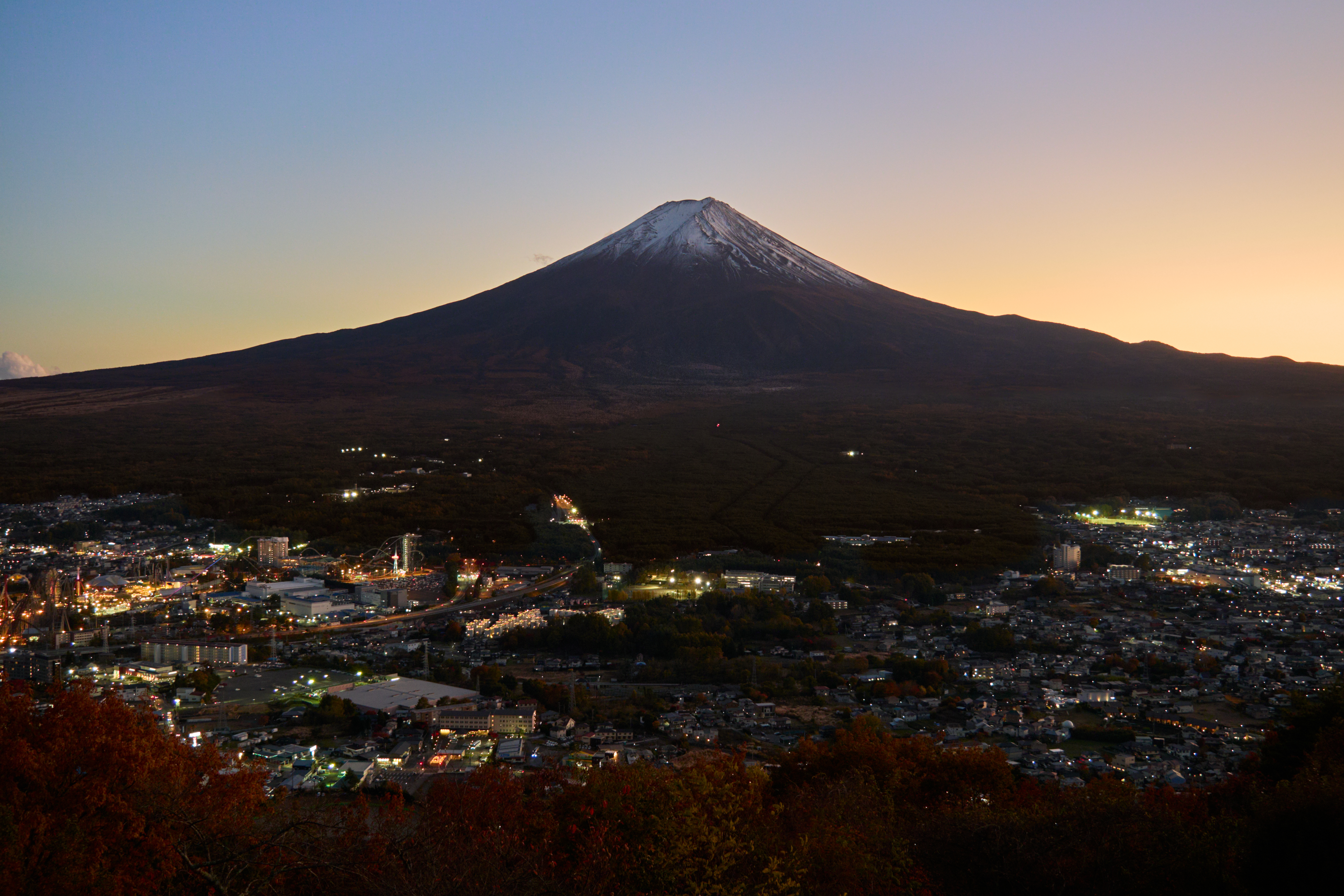
Fujiyoshida at night.

Fujiyoshida (富士吉田市, Fujiyoshida-shi) is a city located in Yamanashi Prefecture, Japan. As of 1 May 2019, the city had an estimated population of 48,782 in 19,806 households and a population density of 400 persons per km^{2}. The total area of the city is 121.74 square kilometres (47.00 sq mi).

== Geography ==
Fujiyoshida lies at the northern base of Mount Fuji, and is built upon old lava flows. It is considered a high-elevation city in Japan, at 650 to 850 metres (2,140 to 2,800 feet) above sea level. The city is also located between two of the Fuji Five Lakes. The Katsura River flows through the eastern part of the city.

=== Neighboring municipalities ===
- Shizuoka Prefecture
  - Fujinomiya
  - Suntō District: Oyama
- Yamanashi Prefecture
  - Tsuru
  - Minamitsuru District: Nishikatsura, Oshino, Yamanakako, Narusawa, Fujikawaguchiko

=== Climate ===
The city has a climate characterized by hot and humid summers, and relatively mild winters (Köppen climate classification Cfa). The average annual temperature in Fujiyoshida is 9.1 °C (48.4 °F). The average annual rainfall is 1,845 millimetres (72.6 in) with September as the wettest month. The temperatures are highest on average in August, at around 21 °C (70 °F), and lowest in January, at around −2.3 °C (27.9 °F).

== Demographics ==
Per Japanese census data, the population of Fujiyoshida has declined in recent decades.

Historical population
Year	Pop.	±%
1940	49,960	—
1950	61,882	+23.9%
1960	42,607	−31.1%
1970	50,046	+17.5%
1980	53,569	+7.0%
1990	54,804	+2.3%
2000	54,090	−1.3%
2010	50,619	−6.4%
2020	46,530	−8.1%

== History ==
Following the Meiji restoration, the area around Fujiyoshida was organized into Minamitsuru District, Yamanashi per the cadastral reforms of July 22, 1878. With the establishment of the modern municipalities system on July 1, 1889, the villages of Mizuho, Akemi and Fukuchi were established. In 1939, Mizuho was raised to town status and renamed Shimoyoshida. Likewise, in 1947, Fukuchi was raised to town status and renamed Fujikamiyoshida and Akemi was raised to town status in 1948, retaining its original name. These three towns merged on March 20, 1951, to form the city of Fujiyoshida.

== Government ==
Fujiyoshida has a mayor-council form of government with a directly elected mayor and a unicameral city legislature of 20 members.

== Economy ==
For several centuries, artisans around the Fujiyoshida area have produced high quality textiles, and now the city is the center of commerce and high technology in southern Yamanashi Prefecture.

== Education ==
- Showa University
- Fujiyoshida has seven public elementary schools and four public middle schools operated by the city government, and three public private high schools operated by the Yamanashi Prefectural Board of Education. The city also has one private middle school and one private high school.

=== Senior high schools ===
In Japan the public Senior High Schools are operated by the prefecture, which in this case in the Yamanashi prefecture. While not compulsory, 94% of all junior high school graduates entered high schools. These high schools are the equivalent of grades 10 – 12 in the United States or the Fifth and Sixth form in the English system.

==== Prefectural public high schools ====
- Fuji Hokuryo High School
- Hibarigaoka High School
- Yoshida High School

==== Private high schools ====
- Fuji Gakuen High School

=== Junior high schools ===
The public Junior High Schools are operated by the City of Fujiyoshida. These schools are the equivalent of grades 6 – 9 in the United States or the First to Fourth form in the English system.

==== Municipal junior high schools ====
- Akemi Junior High School
- Fujimidai Junior High School
- Shimoyoshida Junior High School
- Yoshida Junior High School

==== Private junior high schools ====
- Fuji Gakuen Junior High School

=== Primary schools ===
The public Primary Schools are operated by the City of Fujiyoshida. Municipal Primary Schools

- Akemi Elementary School
- Fuji Elementary School
- Shimoyoshida 2nd Elementary School
- Shimoyoshida Daiichi Elementary School
- Shimoyoshida Higashi Elementary School
- Yoshida Elementary School
- Yoshida Nishi Elementary School

== Transportation ==
=== Railway ===
- Fuji Kyuko - Fujikyuko Line
  - Kotobuki - Yoshiikeonsenmae - Shimoyoshida - Gekkōji - Fujisan

=== Highway ===
- Chūō Expressway
- Higashifuji-goko Road
- National Route 137
- National Route 138
- National Route 139
- National Route 300
- National Route 413

== Sister cities ==
- Colorado Springs, Colorado, United States, since 1962
- Chamonix-Mont Blanc, France, since 1978

== Local attractions ==
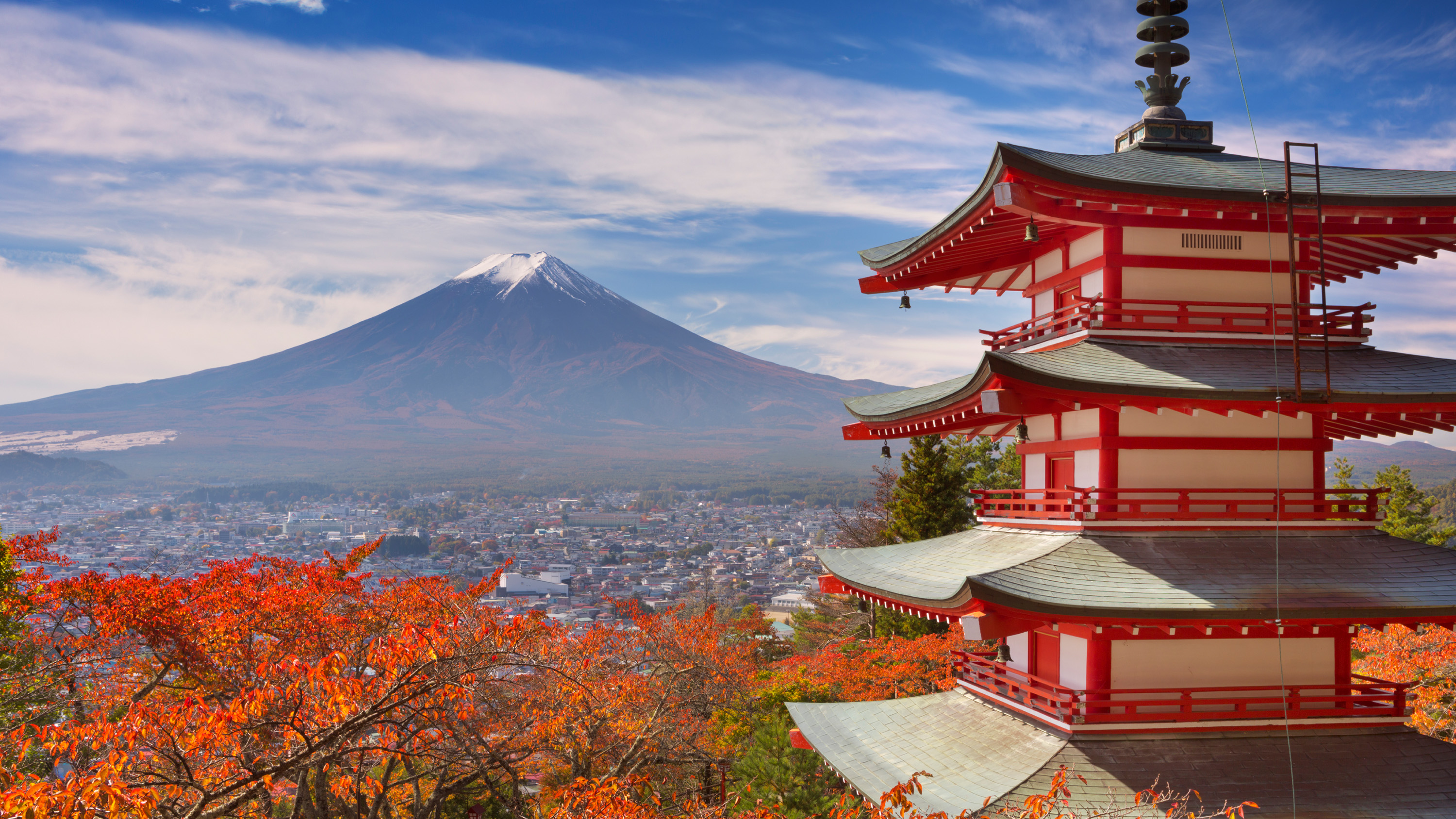
Iconic view of Chūrei-tō with Mount Fuji in the background.

- Arakurayama Sengen Park and the Chūrei-tō pagoda, built on a hilltop facing Mount Fuji.
- Fuji-Q Highland an amusement park with a variety of attractions suitable for adults and children.
- Kitaguchi Hongū Fuji Sengen Jinja, a Shinto shrine dedicated to the kami of Mount Fuji, the Kitaguchi Hongū Fuji Sengen Jinja is the historical starting point for pilgrims climbing the mountain. The main structure was originally built in 788 and underwent reconstruction in the 17th century. Additional buildings include a shrine dedicated to Takeda Shingen (1521–1573), and a red torii which is taken down and rebuilt every "Fuji Year" (60 years). The shrine has a local history museum which displays items from Fujiyoshida's past including household items, farm implements, clothing and samples of the cities' famous textiles.
- Mt. Fuji Radar Dome Museum. A tribute to the meteorologists who built a radar research facility at the summit of Mount Fuji, which features a room which simulates the conditions at the summit of the mountain.
- Mt. Fuji Visitors Center. It is home to interactive displays, videos, books and guides about Mount Fuji.

== Notable people from Fujiyoshida ==
- Keiji Mutoh, professional wrestler
- Shun Sugata, actor
