= Yamanakako =

Yamanakako 山中湖村
- Village
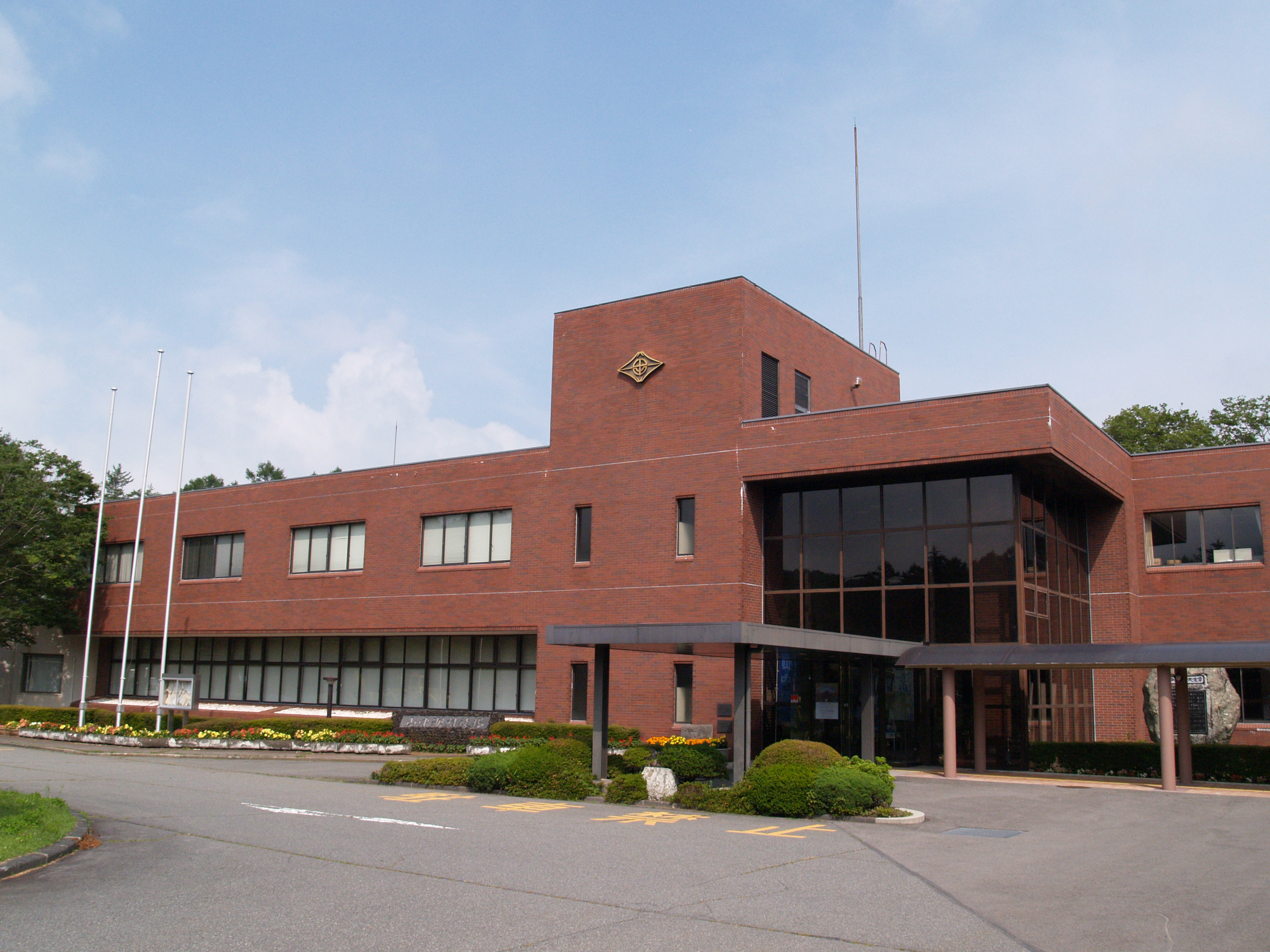
- Yamanakako Village Office

- Flag Seal

- Location of Yamanakako in Yamanashi Prefecture

- Coordinates: 35°25′N 138°52′E
- Country: Japan
- Region: Chūbu; Tōkai
- Prefecture: Yamanashi
- District: Minamitsuru

Area
  - Total: 52.81 km^{2} (20.39 sq mi)

Population (April 30, 2019)
  - Total: 5,826
  - Density: 110.3/km^{2} (285.7/sq mi)
- Time zone: UTC+9 (Japan Standard Time)
- Phone number: 0555-62-9977
- Address: 237-1 Yamanaka Yamanakako-mura, Tsuru-gun, Yamanashi 401-0595
- Climate: Dfb
- Website: Official website
- Symbols
- Bird: Swan
- Flower: Rose
- Tree: Taxus cuspidata

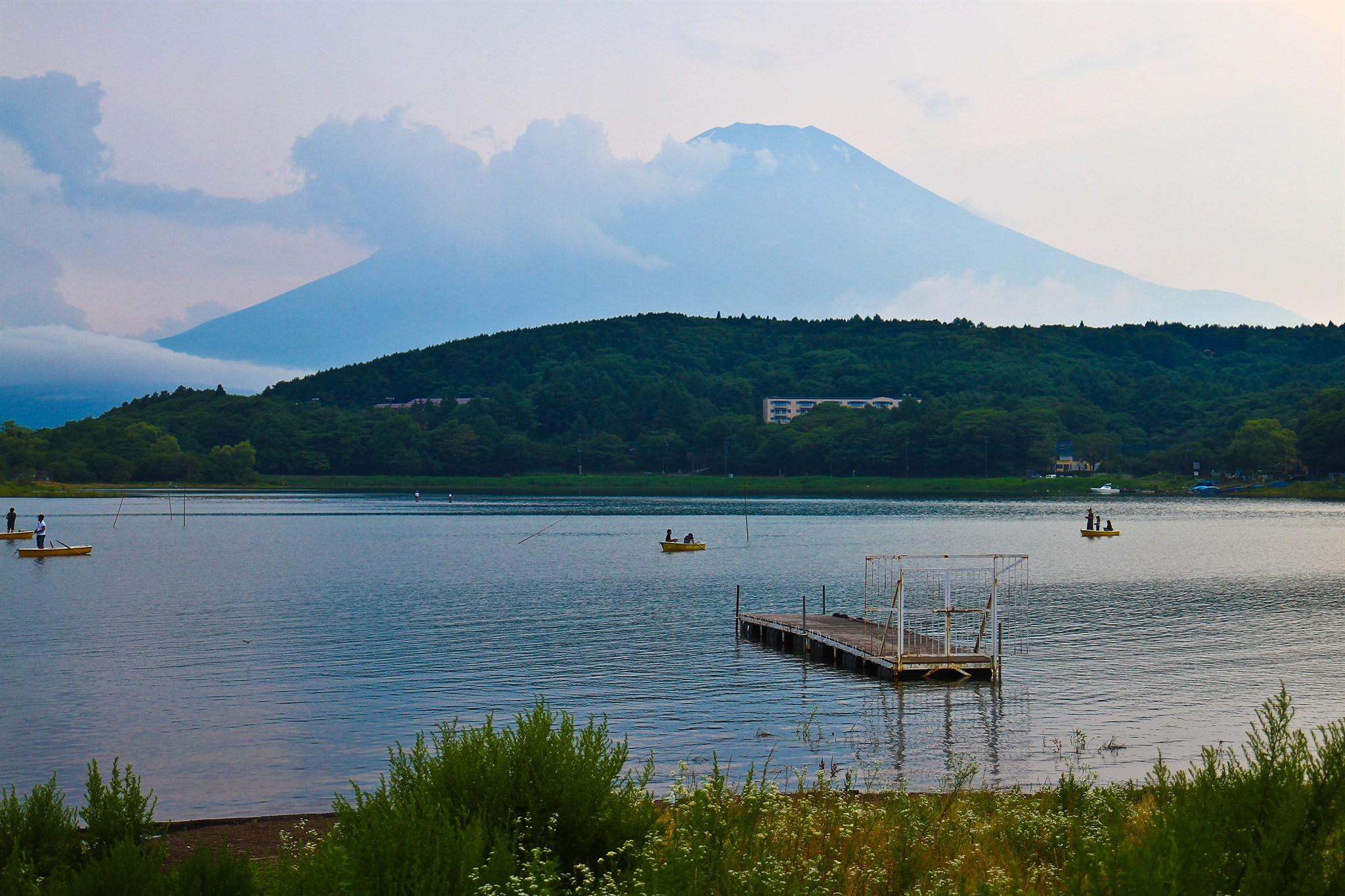
Lake Yamanaka with Mount Fuji

Yamanakako (山中湖村, Yamanakako-mura) is a village located in Yamanashi Prefecture, Japan. As of 30 April 2019, the village had an estimated population of 5,826 in 2401 households, and a population density of 110 inhabitants per square kilometre (280/sq mi). The total area of the village is 52.81 km^{2} (20.39 sq mi).

== Geography ==
Yamanakako is located in the far southeastern corner of Yamanashi Prefecture, surrounding Lake Yamanaka. Much of the village area is protected forest, extending to the base of Mount Fuji, which is also visible from many locations.

=== Neighboring municipalities ===
Kanagawa Prefecture

- Yamakita

Shizuoka Prefecture

- Oyama

Yamanashi Prefecture

- Dōshi
- Fujiyoshida
- Oshino
- Tsuru

== Climate ==
The village has a climate characterized by hot and humid summers, and relatively mild winters (Köppen climate classification Cfb). The average annual temperature in Yamanakako is 9.4 °C. The average annual rainfall is 1876 mm with September as the wettest month.

Climate data for Yamanaka (1991–2020 normals, extremes 1977–present)
Month	Jan	Feb	Mar	Apr	May	Jun	Jul	Aug	Sep	Oct	Nov	Dec	Year
Record high °C (°F)	17.5 (63.5)	21.1 (70.0)	24.1 (75.4)	28.0 (82.4)	30.6 (87.1)	33.2 (91.8)	34.9 (94.8)	33.6 (92.5)	32.1 (89.8)	29.5 (85.1)	25.2 (77.4)	21.1 (70.0)	34.9 (94.8)
Mean daily maximum °C (°F)	4.0 (39.2)	5.0 (41.0)	8.8 (47.8)	14.5 (58.1)	19.1 (66.4)	21.5 (70.7)	25.7 (78.3)	26.6 (79.9)	22.4 (72.3)	16.9 (62.4)	12.4 (54.3)	6.9 (44.4)	15.3 (59.5)
Daily mean °C (°F)	−2.4 (27.7)	−1.2 (29.8)	2.5 (36.5)	7.9 (46.2)	12.8 (55.0)	16.5 (61.7)	20.6 (69.1)	21.2 (70.2)	17.4 (63.3)	11.6 (52.9)	5.9 (42.6)	0.5 (32.9)	9.4 (48.9)
Mean daily minimum °C (°F)	−8.9 (16.0)	−7.7 (18.1)	−3.6 (25.5)	1.4 (34.5)	6.7 (44.1)	12.1 (53.8)	16.4 (61.5)	16.8 (62.2)	13.2 (55.8)	6.7 (44.1)	0.1 (32.2)	−5.6 (21.9)	4.0 (39.2)
Record low °C (°F)	−19.5 (−3.1)	−22.2 (−8.0)	−19.6 (−3.3)	−14.1 (6.6)	−5.3 (22.5)	3.4 (38.1)	8.4 (47.1)	8.8 (47.8)	0.5 (32.9)	−5.8 (21.6)	−9.6 (14.7)	−16.6 (2.1)	−22.2 (−8.0)
Average precipitation mm (inches)	82.1 (3.23)	80.8 (3.18)	174.6 (6.87)	181.1 (7.13)	188.0 (7.40)	221.2 (8.71)	219.9 (8.66)	224.0 (8.82)	375.1 (14.77)	310.4 (12.22)	144.3 (5.68)	86.3 (3.40)	2,287.8 (90.07)
Average precipitation days (≥ 1.0 mm)	5.5	6.0	10.4	10.1	10.6	12.7	12.9	10.5	12.5	11.1	8.0	5.4	115.6
Mean monthly sunshine hours	172.3	158.6	170.8	186.6	189.8	134.5	157.8	185.4	114.3	117.4	141.3	155.2	1,884.1
Source: Japan Meteorological Agency

== Demographics ==
Per Japanese census data, the population of Yamanakako has recently plateaued after a long period of growth.

Historical population
Year	Pop.	±%
1940	2,623	—
1950	3,683	+40.4%
1960	3,361	−8.7%
1970	4,079	+21.4%
1980	4,637	+13.7%
1990	5,040	+8.7%
2000	5,274	+4.6%
2010	5,324	+0.9%
2020	5,179	−2.7%

== History ==
Numerous Jōmon period remains have been found near Lake Yamanaka, and ancient Tsuru County, of which the area is a part, is mentioned in the late Nara period Engishiki records. The area was a contested border region between the Takeda clan, Imagawa clan and Odawara Hōjō clan during the Sengoku period.

During the Edo period, all of Kai Province was tenryō territory under direct control of the Tokugawa shogunate. With the establishment of the modern municipalities system in the early Meiji period in 1875, the village of Nakano was created within Minamitsuru District, Yamanashi Prefecture by the merger of Yamanaka and Hirano hamlets. This village was renamed Yamanakako Village on January 1, 1965.

== Economy ==
The economy of Yamanakako is primarily based on tourism and agriculture.

== Education ==
Yamanakako has one public elementary school and one public junior high school, and one combined elementary/middle school, all operated by the village government. The village does not have a high school.

== Transportation ==
=== Railway ===
- Yamanakako has no railway service.

=== Highway ===
- Higashifuji-goko Road
- National Route 138
- National Route 413

== Local attractions ==
- Lake Yamanaka
- Mishima Yukio Literary Museum
