= Arakurayama Sengen Park =

Park in Fujiyoshida, Japan

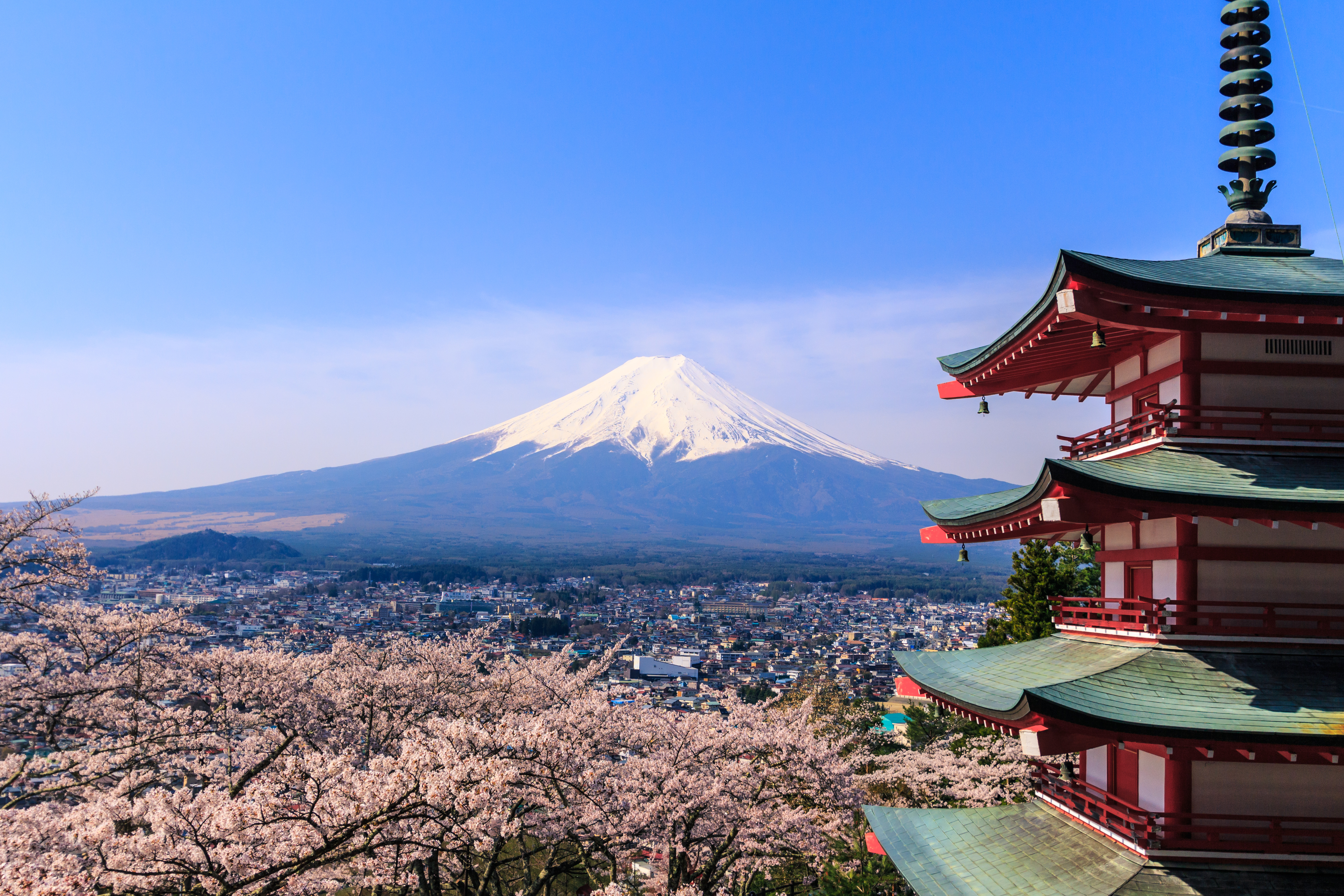
- Chūrei-tō with Mt. Fuji
- Interactive map of Arakurayama Sengen Park
- Location: Fujiyoshida, Yamanashi Prefecture
- Coordinates: 35°30′4.3″N 138°48′5.0″E
- Created: 1959

Arakurayama Sengen Park (新倉山浅間公園, Arakurayama-Sengen-Kōen) is a block park located at 3353 Arakura, Fujiyoshida, Yamanashi Prefecture, Japan. Installed in October 1959. Located on the hillside of Mount Arakura (Japanese: 新倉山), it covers an area of about 4.3 hectares.

It is popular as a famous scenic spot where you can see Mount Fuji, a red five-story pagoda, and cherry blossom trees at a glance. Sangoku Daiichisan Arakura Fuji Sengen Shrine (ja:三國第一山新倉富士浅間神社) is enshrined, and Mount Arakura is a sacred area. There are about 650 cherry blossoms (Prunus × yedoensis) and a memorial tower for the war dead in the park.

== Tourism & Festival ==
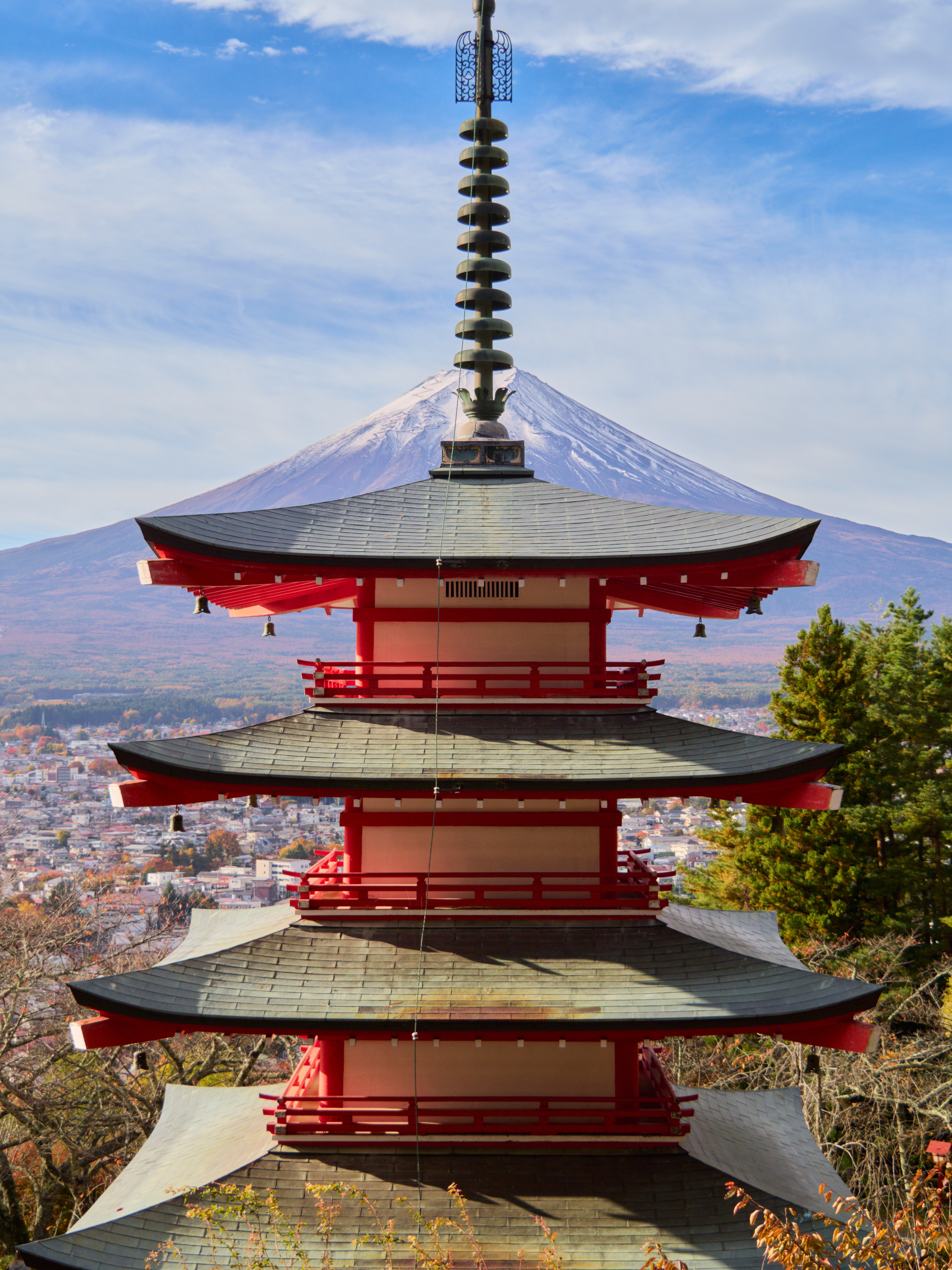
The Chureito Pagoda, a five-story pagoda at Arakurayama Sengen Park, with Mount Fuji visible behind it and the city of Fujiyoshida below.

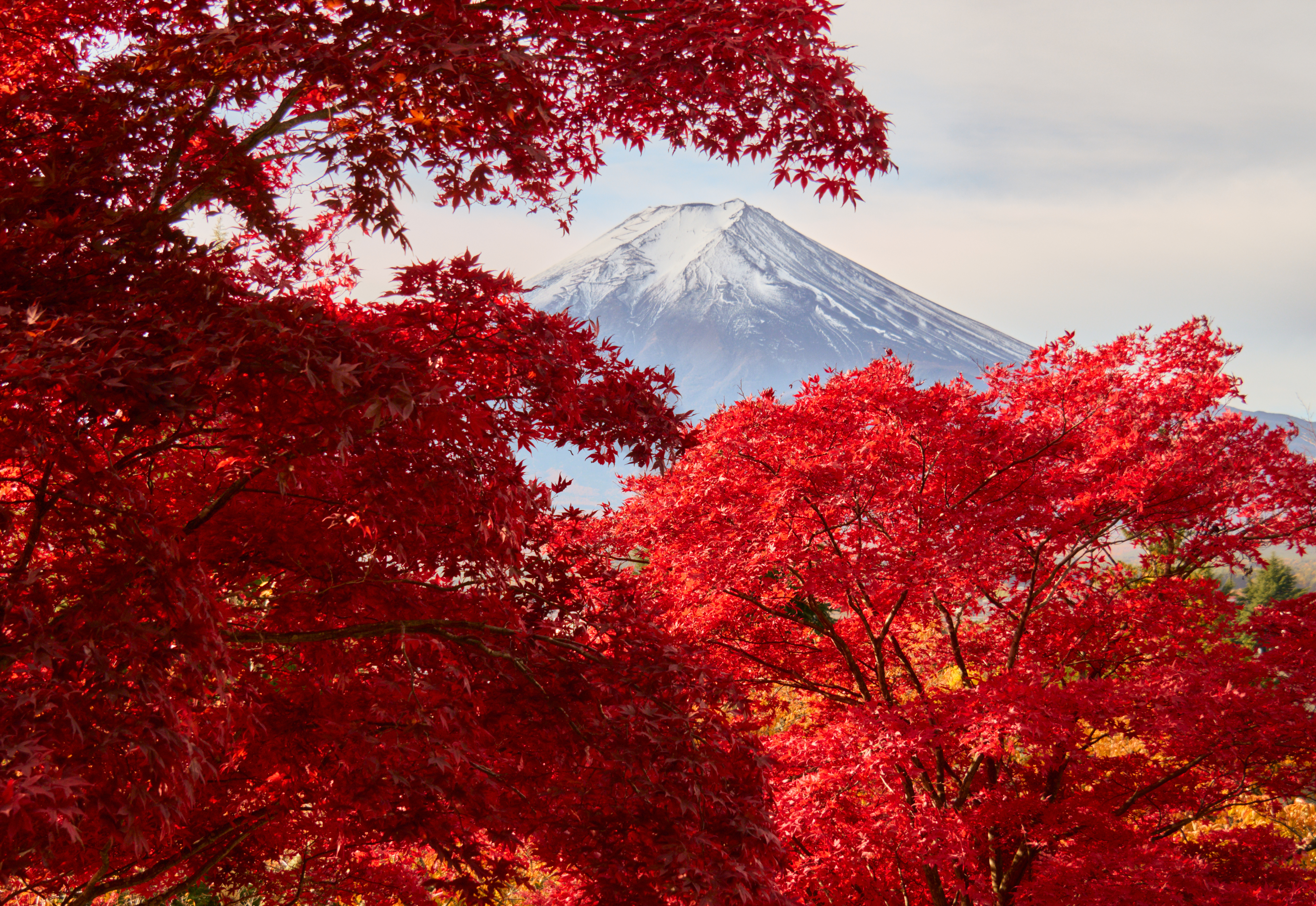
Mount Fuji, peeking through autumn foliage in Arakurayama Sengen Park.

It is a park with a panoramic view of Fujiyoshida city and Mount Fuji, and is famous for its photographs of the five-storied pagoda (a pagoda for the war dead (ja:忠霊塔, Chūrei-tō), not a stupa), cherry blossoms, and Mount Fuji. It was ranked 10th among the "100 Views with Mount Fuji" announced by the Japanese Ministry of the Environment. It has also been published in Lufthansa's in-flight magazine and textbooks used in Thai compulsory education courses, and became the cover of the 4th revised edition of "Michelin Green Guide Japan", has received two ratings. Fujisan Keizai Shimbun considers that the number of foreign visitors to temples and shrines around Mount Fuji has increased due to this and the influence of Mount Fuji's registration as a World Heritage Site.

By appealing to a Thai tourism company in 2011, Yamanashi Prefecture is particularly popular and well known among Thais as "a place where you can see Kyoto and Fuji at the same time". The shooting and viewing point is on private land next to the park, and there is a cliff about 5 meters high between it and the park. As the number of tourists, including foreigners, has increased and many tourists have come to the masonry and slopes, Fujiyoshida City started construction from early September 2015 to December 2015 by prohibiting photography and viewing points and setting up fences.

In April 2016, the Arakurayama Sengen Park Cherry blossom Festival was held for the first time. In order to accommodate foreign tourists, English, Thai, and Chinese language pointing conversation cards were distributed to store owners. Furthermore, since there is a colony of irises when climbing Mount Arakura from the Chūrei-tō for about 15 minutes, the "Ayame Matsuri" (あやめ祭り) is also held around June in the park.

The cherry blossoms (Prunus × yedoensis) planted in the park have become old trees and the tree vigor is declining. Since 2018, Fujiyoshida city, which manages the trees, has been carrying out cherry tree vigor restoration work by Toshihito Arai, Tree doctor who belongs to the cooperation of the Flower Association of Japan. In 2019, in addition to soliciting donations through crowdfunding, Fuji Kyuko donated 1 million yen to Fujiyoshida City.

It was closed from 3 April 2020 to prevent the spread of COVID-19, but on 1 June 2020, all facilities in the park were opened except for the observatory.

On February 3rd 2026, the mayor of Fujiyoshida City cancelled the cherry blossom festival; citing issues with traffic congestion, trespassing and sanitation.

== Facility list ==
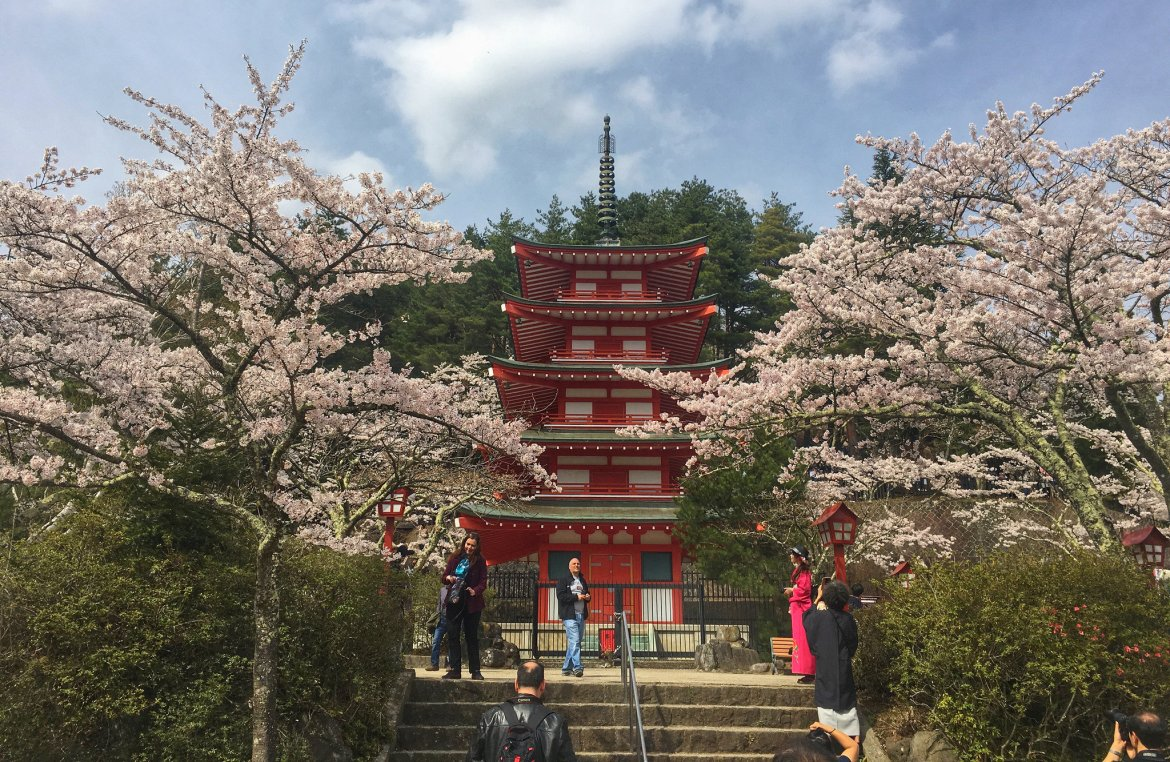
Chūrei-tō and cherry blossoms

- Sakuya-hime Stairs (Japanese: 咲くや姫階段)
  - It has 398 steps and is about 200 meters long.
- Parking
  - It can accommodate 87 cars.
- Lee Yangji's literary monument
  - Unveiled on 22 May 2016. Due to the relationship that Lee Yangji grew up in Fujiyoshida.
- Memorial Pagoda for the War Dead (Chūrei-tō, Japanese: 戦没者慰霊塔（忠霊塔）, Location: Chureito Pagoda, 3360-1 Arakura, Fujiyoshida City, Yamanashi Prefecture)
  - A 19.5 meter high tower made of reinforced concrete and installed in 1962. It was built to enshrine 1,055 war dead people from the city. A memorial service for the war dead is held every September.

== Traffic access ==
- 10 minutes walk from Shimoyoshida Station on the Fujikyuko Line.
- 10 minutes by car from the Chūō Expressway Fujiyoshida Nishikatsura Smart IC, 10 minutes on foot from the Shimoyoshida bus stop.
