= Higashifuji-goko Road =

Toll road in Yamanashi and Shizuoka Prefectures, Japan

Higashifuji-goko Road
- 国道138号
- 東富士五湖道路 (Higashifujigoko Dōro)

Route information
- Maintained by Central Nippon Expressway Company
- Length: 18 km (11 mi)
- Existed: 1986–present
- Component highways: National Route 138

Major junctions
- From: Fujiyoshida Interchange; Chūō Expressway; Yamanashi Prefectural Route 707 in Fujiyoshida, Yamanashi
- To: Subashiri Interchange; National Route 138 in Oyama, Shizuoka

Location
- Country: Japan

Highway system
- National highways of Japan; Expressways of Japan

The Higashifuji-goko Road (東富士五湖道路, Higashifujigoko Dōro) (lit. East Fuji Five Lakes Road) is a 2-laned toll road linking Yamanashi Prefecture and Shizuoka Prefecture in Japan. It is owned and managed by Central Nippon Expressway Company.

== Overview ==
Officially the road is designated as a bypass for National Route 138. It is also classified as a road for motor vehicles only (自動車専用道路, Jidōsha Senyō Dōro) and access is controlled with interchanges and junctions in a similar manner to national expressways in Japan.

The road functions as an extension of the Chūō Expressway Kawaguchiko Route (a branch route of the Chūō Expressway) in southern Yamanashi Prefecture, passing along the eastern base of Mount Fuji and to the west of the Fuji Five Lakes. The road then crosses into Shizuoka Prefecture to the south. The road terminates at an interchange with the original National Route 138; beyond this point, National Route 138 continues towards the city of Gotenba and an interchange with the Tōmei Expressway.

Tolls are collected at toll plazas located at both ends of the road. Each toll plaza collects 520 yen from regular passenger vehicles. Traversing the entire road therefore costs 1040 yen, while entering or exiting the road at the halfway point (Yamanakako Interchange) costs only 520 yen. Electronic Toll Collection (ETC) is accepted for payment, however no discount programs are in effect.

The northern half of the road was completed in 1986 and the southern half was completed in 1989.

== Interchange list ==
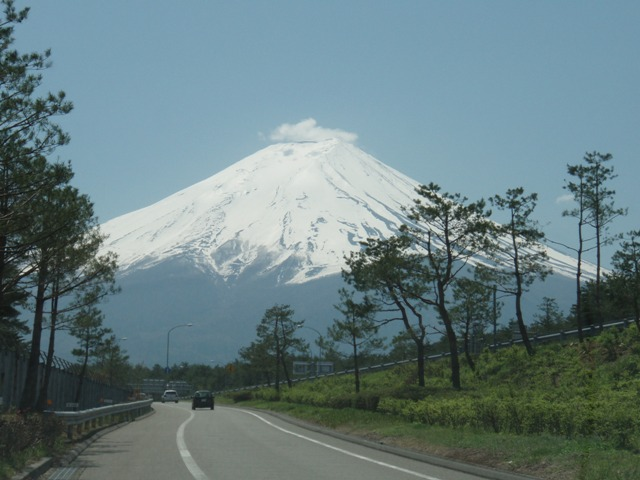
View of Mount Fuji from the road

- IC - interchange

| No. | Name | Connections | Dist. from Origin | Notes | Location | |
Through to Chūō Expressway
| 3 | Fujiyoshida IC | Pref. Route 707 (Fujikawaguchiko Fuji Route) | 0.0 | | Fujiyoshida | Yamanashi |
| 4 | Yamanakako IC | National Route 138 | 8.4 | | Yamanakako | Yamanashi |
| 5 | Subashiri IC | National Route 138 | 18.0 | | Oyama | Shizuoka |
Roadway continues as National Route 138
