= Dōshi =

Village in Yamanashi Prefecture, Japan

Dōshi 道志村
- Village
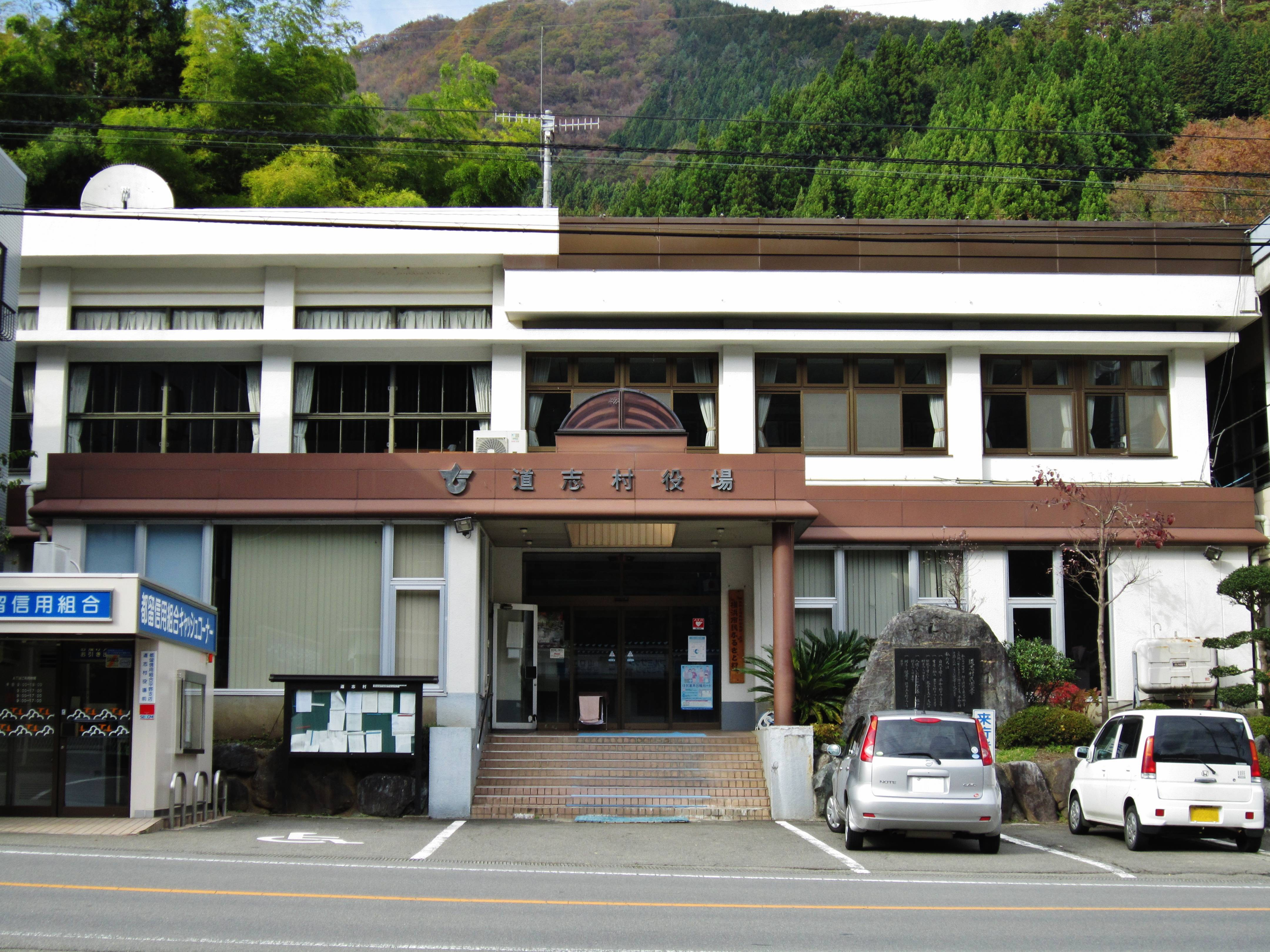
- Dōshi Village Office

- Flag Seal

- Location of Dōshi in Yamanashi Prefecture

- Coordinates: 35°32′N 139°2′E
- Country: Japan
- Region: Chūbu; Tōkai
- Prefecture: Yamanashi Prefecture
- District: Minamitsuru

Area
  - Total: 79.57 km^{2} (30.72 sq mi)

Population (June 1, 2019)
  - Total: 1,676
  - Density: 21.06/km^{2} (54.55/sq mi)
- Time zone: UTC+9 (Japan Standard Time)
- Tree: Cryptomeria
- Flower: Lilium auratum
- Phone number: 0554-52-2111
- Address: 6181-1 Dōshi-mura, Minamitsuru-gun, Yamanashi 402-0209
- Website: Official website

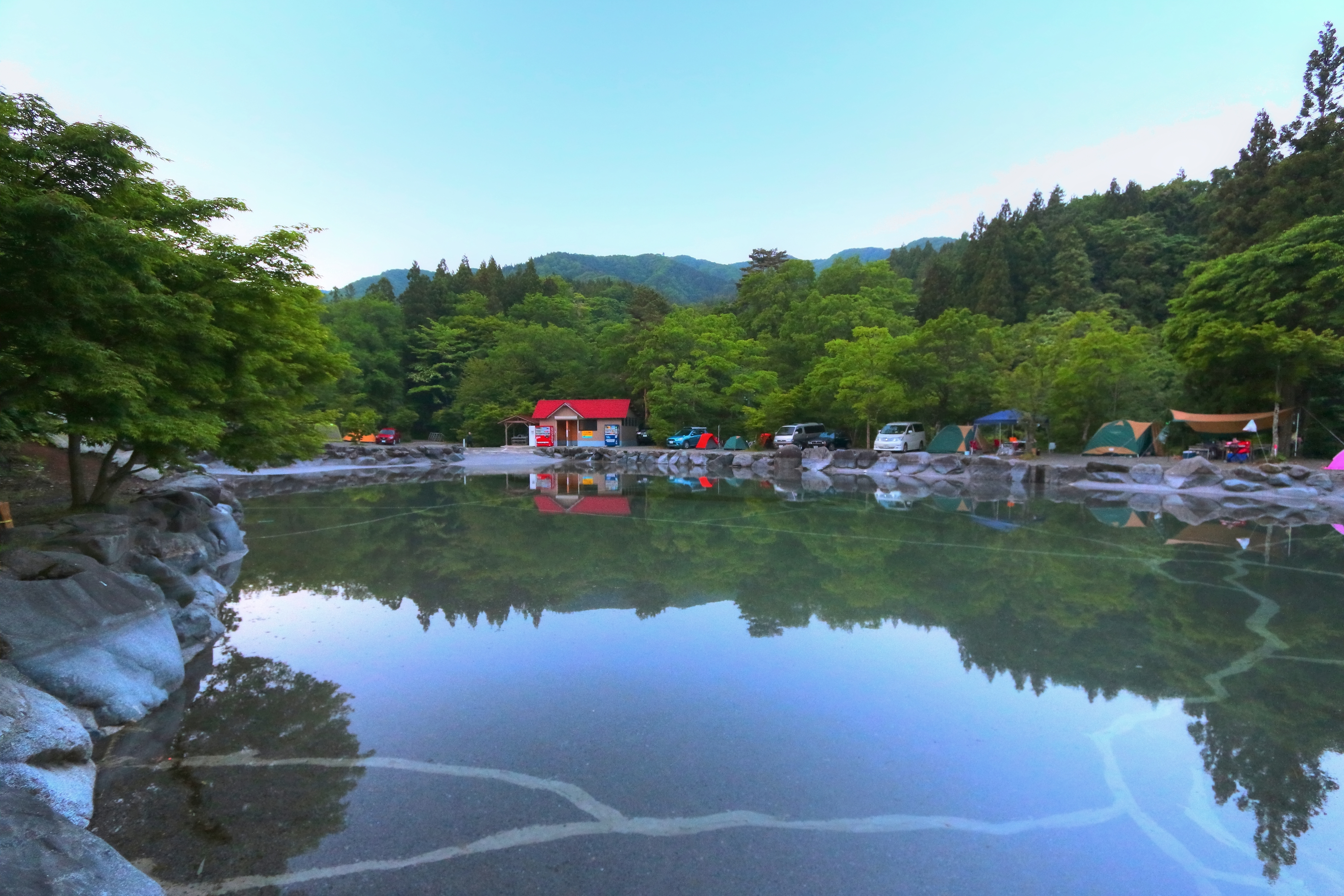
Dōshi-no-mori campsite

Dōshi (道志村, Dōshi-mura) is a village located in Yamanashi Prefecture, Japan. As of 1 June 2019, the village had an estimated population of 1,676 across 623 households, and a population density of 21 persons per km^{2}. The total area of the village is 79.57 km^{2}.

== Geography ==
Dōshi is in the far southeastern corner of Yamanashi Prefecture, in the Tanzawa Mountains, which isolate it from the rest of the prefecture to the north and east. The village is mostly forest and has numerous campsites.

=== Neighboring municipalities ===
Kanagawa Prefecture

- Sagamihara
- Yamakita

Yamanashi Prefecture

- Tsuru
- Uenohara
- Yamanakako

=== Climate ===
The village has a climate characterized by characterized by hot and humid summers, and relatively mild winters (Köppen climate classification Cfa). The average annual temperature in Dōshi is 11.8 °C. The average annual rainfall is 1677 mm with September as the wettest month. The temperatures are highest on average in August, at around 25.9 °C, and lowest in January, at around 2.0 °C.

== Demographics ==
Per Japanese census data, the population of Dōshi has gradually decreased over the past 70 years.

Historical population
Year	Pop.	±%
1940	2,961	—
1950	3,227	+9.0%
1960	3,108	−3.7%
1970	2,627	−15.5%
1980	2,231	−15.1%
1990	2,150	−3.6%
2000	2,087	−2.9%
2010	1,919	−8.0%
2020	1,607	−16.3%

== History ==
During the Edo period, all of Kai Province was tenryō territory under direct control of the Tokugawa shogunate. With the establishment of the modern municipalities system in the early Meiji period in 1889, the village of Dōshi was created in Minamitsuru District, Yamanashi Prefecture. From 1897, the Dōshigawa River, which runs through the village, was designated as a primary source of water for the growing city of Yokohama. From 1916 a large portion of the village land area was designated as a protected watershed.

On June 12, 2003, 653 of the village residents signed a petition to be allowed the village to merge with the city of Yokohama. However, the petition was rejected by the Yamanashi Prefectural Assembly, citing complications over a cross-prefectural merger and issues with the village becoming an exclave of the Yokohama metropolis.

== Economy ==
The economy of Dōshi is primarily based on forestry and agriculture.

== Education ==
Dōshi has one public elementary school and one public junior high school operated by the village government. The village does not have a high school.

== Transportation ==
=== Railway ===
- Dōshi has no railway service.

=== Highway ===
- National Route 413
