= Japan National Route 137 =

Road in Japan

National Route 137
- 国道137号
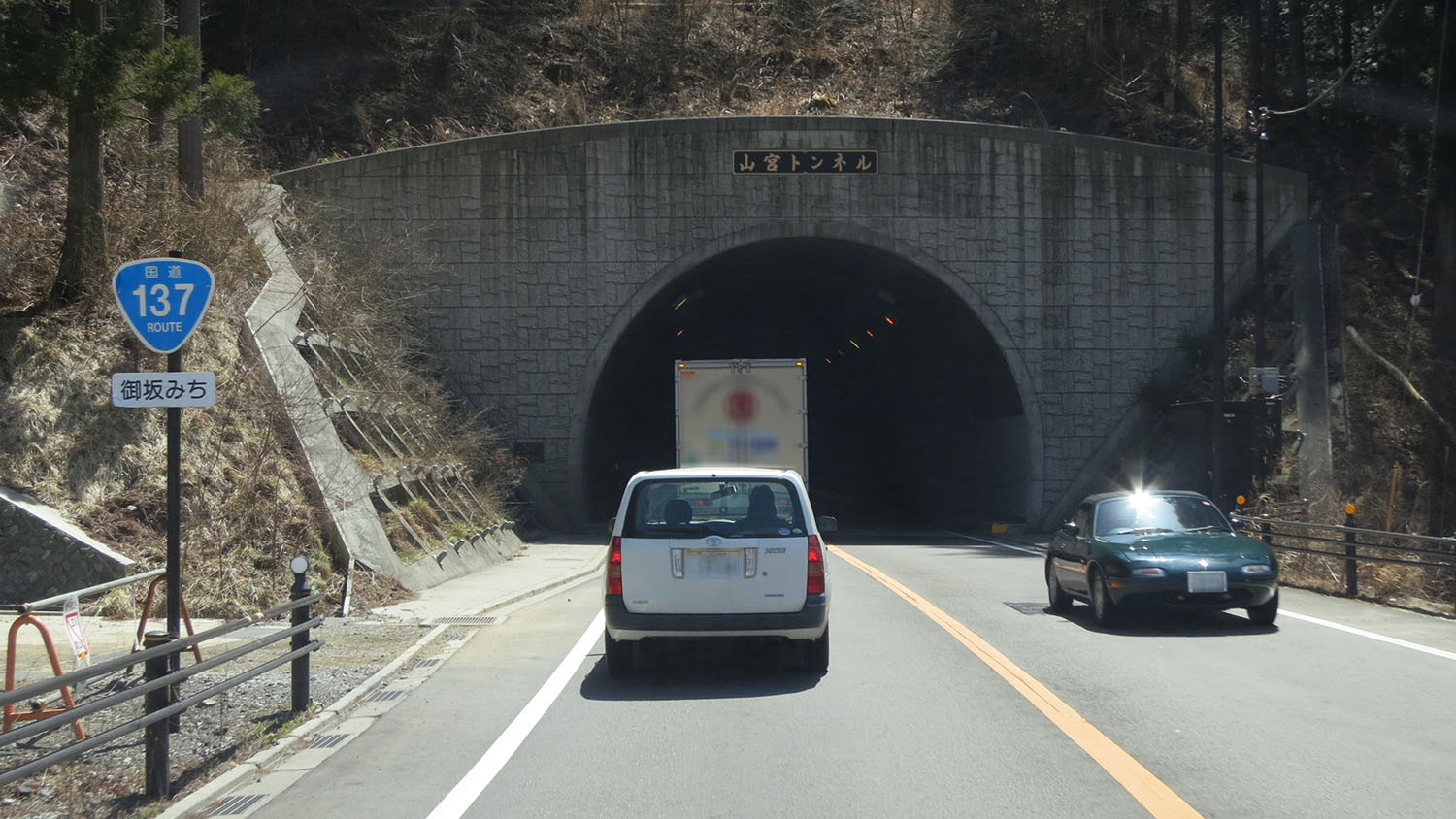

Route information
- Length: 30.0 km (18.6 mi)
- Existed: 1953–present

Major junctions
- South end: National Route 138 / National Route 139 in Fujiyoshida, Yamanashi
- North end: National Route 20 in Fuefuki, Yamanashi

Location
- Country: Japan

Highway system
- National highways of Japan; Expressways of Japan
← National Route 136	→ National Route 138

National Route 137 is a national highway of Japan connecting Fujiyoshida, Yamanashi and Fuefuki, Yamanashi in Japan, with a total length of 30 km (18.64 mi).
