= Chūō Expressway =

Expressway in Japan

Chūō Expressway
- 中央自動車道

Route information
- Length: 366.8 km (227.9 mi) Main Route - 344.9 km Kawaguchiko Route - 21.9 km
- Existed: 1967–present

Major junctions
- From: Takaido Interchange in Suginami, Tokyo; Shuto Expressway Shinjuku Route; Tokyo Metropolitan Route 14
- To: Komaki Junction in Komaki, Aichi; Tōmei Expressway; Kawaguchiko Interchange in Fujikawaguchiko, Yamanashi; Higashifuji-goko Road; National Route 139

Location
- Country: Japan
- Major cities: Hachiōji, Sagamihara, Ōtsuki, Kōfu, Suwa, Okaya, Iida, Nakatsugawa, Tajimi, Kasugai

Highway system
- National highways of Japan; Expressways of Japan

The Chūō Expressway (中央自動車道, Chūō Jidōsha-dō, lit. Central Motorway, formerly Chūō Kōsoku-dōro (中央高速道路) until 1972) is a national expressway in Japan. It is owned and operated by NEXCO Central.

== Naming ==
Officially the expressway is designated as the Chūō Expressway Nishinomiya Route (from Takaido Interchange to Komaki Junction), the Chūō Expressway Nagano Route (from Takaido Interchange to Okaya Junction), and the Chūō Expressway Fujiyoshida Route (from Takaido Interchange through Ōtsuki Junction to Kawaguchiko Interchange, this section being a branch of the main route). These designations do not appear on any signage as all sections are signed simply as the Chūō Expressway.

== Overview ==
The Chūō Expressway is a major roadway connecting the greater Tokyo and Nagoya urban areas, a role also shared by the Tōmei Expressway. While the Tōmei Expressway follows a coastal route, the Chūō Expressway follows an inland route through the mountainous regions of Kanagawa, Yamanashi, Nagano, and Gifu Prefectures, its highest point (1,015 meters above sea level) being at 157.3 km point sandwiched between the Yatsugatake Mountains and Southern Japanese Alps. In addition, a branch of the expressway in Yamanashi Prefecture known as the Kawaguchiko Route facilitates access to Mount Fuji and the Fuji Five Lakes area.

The expressway is 4 lanes for its entire length except for the section between Uenohara Interchange and Ōtuski Junction, which is 6 to 7 lanes. This section was originally 4 lanes as well, however increasing traffic volume led to the construction of a new parallel roadway for Uenohara-bound traffic, with the original 4 lanes of roadway being converted for the use of Ōtsuki-bound traffic only.

Tolls on the section from Takaido Interchange to Hachiōji Interchange are charged at a flat rate. As of October 2024, the toll on this section is 1000 yen for a regular passenger car. Tolls on all other sections of the expressway are assessed according to distance travelled in the same manner as most other national expressways. Also, tolls on the section from Sonohara Interchange to Nakatsugawa Interchange are assessed at 1.6 times the normal rate to account for the high cost of constructing the Enasan Tunnel. Vehicles carrying dangerous materials are forbidden from using this tunnel and must use alternate routes.

== History ==
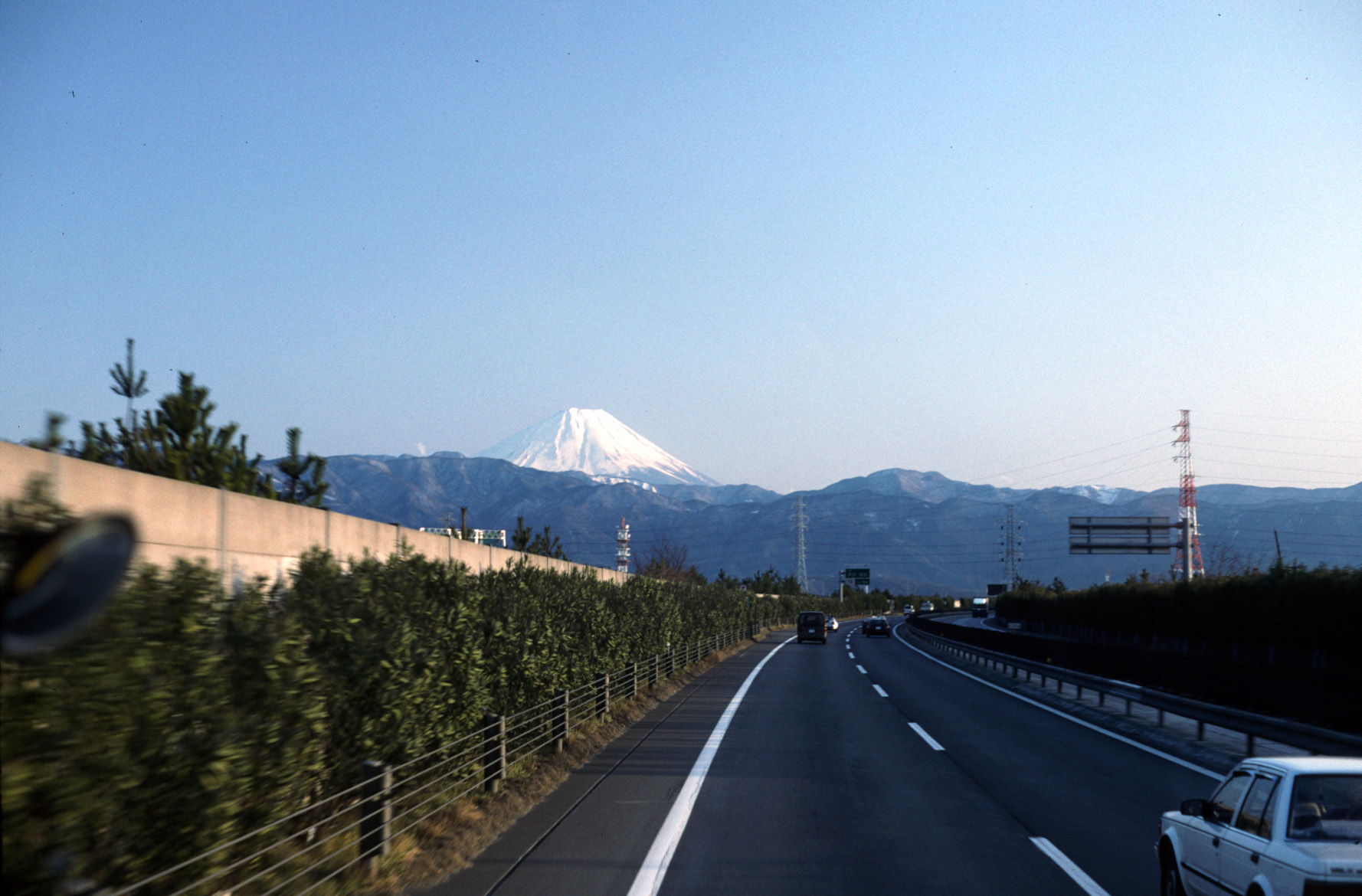
The Chūō Expressway affords many fine views of Mount Fuji.

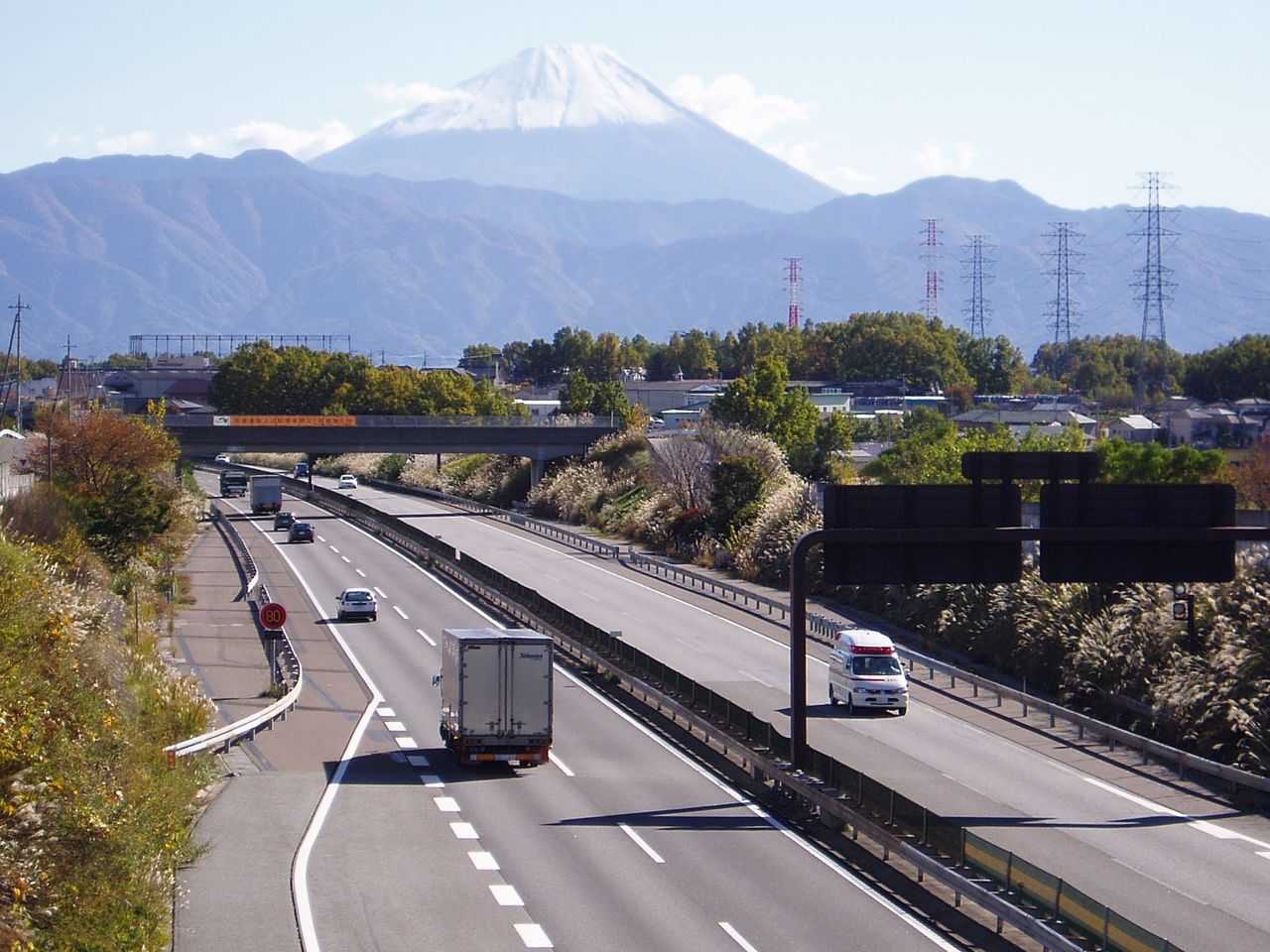
Near Futaba Junction

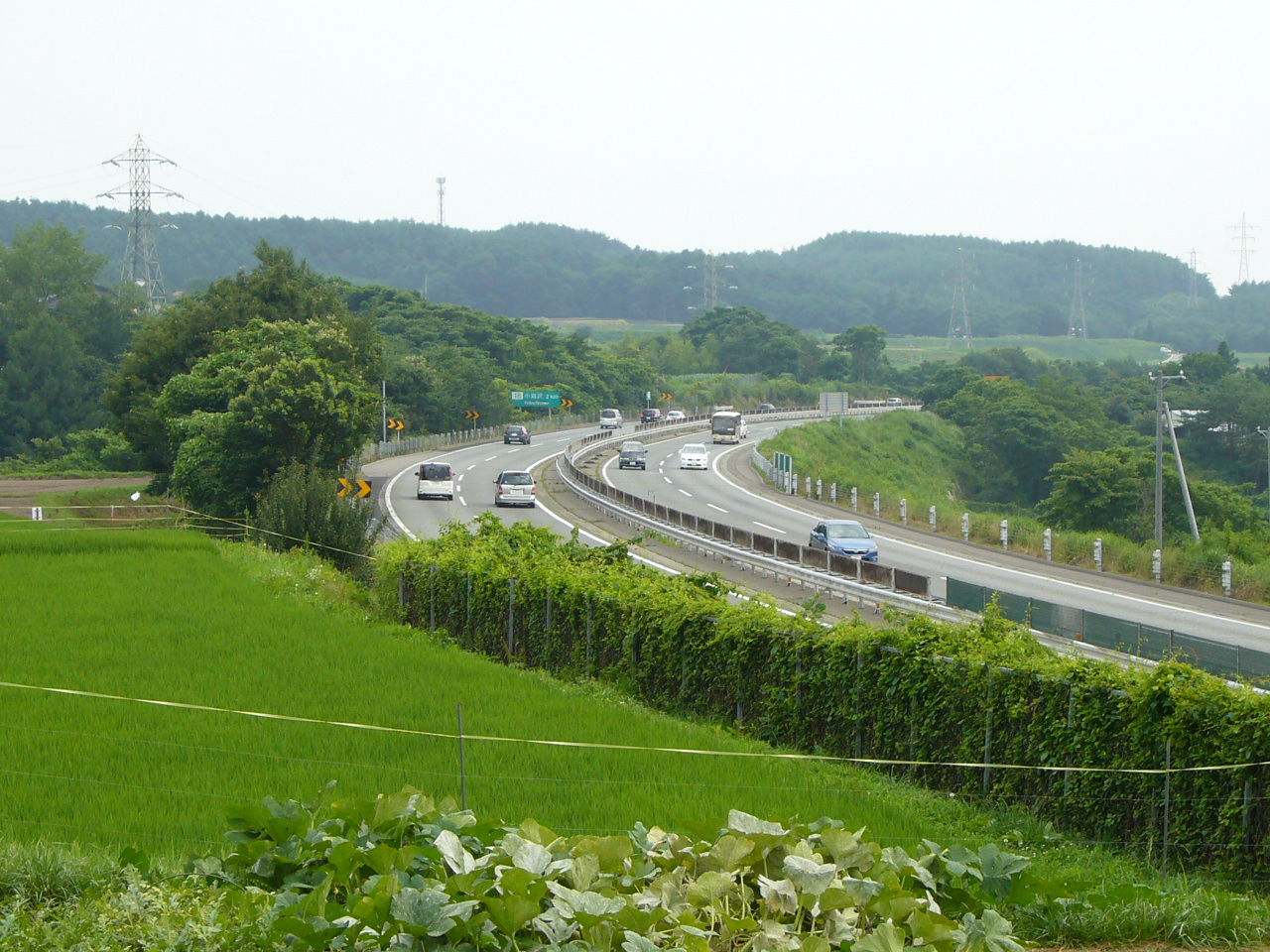
Chūō Expressway in Fujimi, Nagano

- December 15, 1967 - Chōfu Interchange - Hachiōji Interchange section opened.
- December 20, 1968 - Hachiōji Interchange - Sagamiko Interchange section opened.
- March 17, 1969 - Sagamiko Interchange - Kawaguchiko Interchange section opened.
- October 5, 1972 - Tajimi Interchange - Komaki Junction section opened, connecting with the Tōmei Expressway.
- September 6, 1973 - Mizunami Interchange - Tajimi Interchange section opened.
- March 5, 1975 - Nakatsugawa Interchange - Mizunami Interchange section opened.
- August 23, 1975 - Komagane Interchange - Nakatsugawa Interchange section opened (Enasan Tunnel opened with 2 lanes of traffic only).
- May 18, 1976 - Takaido Interchange - Chōfu Interchange section opened.
- September 18, 1976 - Ihoku Interchange - Komagane Interchange section opened.
- December 19, 1976 - Nirasaki Interchange - Kobuchisawa Interchange section opened.
- December 20, 1977 - Ōtsuki Junction - Katsunuma Interchange section opened.
- November 16, 1979 - Komaki-higashi Interchange opened.
- March 26, 1980 - Kōfu-Shōwa Interchange - Nirasaki Interchange section opened.
- March 30, 1981 - Kobuchisawa Interchange - Ihoku Interchange section opened.
- November 10, 1982 - Katsunuma Interchange - Kōfu-Shōwa Interchange section opened, completing the entire route.
- November, 1984 - Tsuru Interchange opened.
- March 25, 1986 - Okaya Junction - Okaya Interchange section opened.
- August 28, 1986 - Connection to Higashifuji-goko Road at Kawaguchiko Interchange is completed.
- September 27, 1986 - Nagasaka Interchange opened.
- March 5, 1988 - Okaya Junction - Okaya Interchange section is transferred to the Nagano Expressway.
- September 27, 1989 - Uenohara Interchange opened.
- March 25, 1992 - Sonohara Interchange opened.
- January, 1993 - Renovation of Dangōzaka Service Area completed. The Komaki-bound service area is moved 2 km closer to Tokyo, while the Tokyo-bound service area is moved to the former site of the Komaki-bound service area.
- April 14, 1995 - Inagi Interchange opened.
- March 24, 2002 - Futaba Junction is opened, connecting with the Chūbu-Ōdan Expressway.
- March 16, 2003 - Reconstruction of the Uenohara Interchange - Ōtsuki Junction section is completed (additional lanes added, areas with sharp curves abandoned, Tokyo-bound Dangōzaka Service Area renovated, area near Ōtsuki Junction susceptible to traffic weaving eliminated).
- March 19, 2005 - Toki Junction is opened, connecting with the Tōkai-Kanjō Expressway.
- October 1, 2005 - Expressway management is transferred from Japan Highway Public Corporation to Central Nippon Expressway Company as a result of the privatization of the national expressway network.
- October 1, 2006 - Futaba Smart Interchange opened.
- June 23, 2007 - Hachiōji Junction is opened, connecting with the Ken-Ō Expressway.
- December 2, 2012 - Sasago Tunnel collapses, killing nine people.

== List of interchanges and features ==
- IC - interchange, SIC - smart interchange, JCT - junction, SA - service area, PA - parking area, BS - bus stop, TN - tunnel, TB - toll gate

=== Main Route ===
No.	Name	Connections	Dist. from Origin	Bus Stop	Notes	Speed Limit	Location	
Through to Shuto Expressway Shinjuku Route
1	Takaido IC	Met. Route 14 (Shinjuku Kunitachi Route) (Tōhachi Road)	0.0		Tokyo-bound exit only	60 km/h	Suginami	Tokyo
<2>	Chūō JCT	Tokyo Gaikan Expressway			Planned	60 km/h	Mitaka	Tokyo
BS	Mitaka Bus Stop		4.0	○		60 km/h	Mitaka	Tokyo
TB	Mitaka Toll Gate		4.0		Komaki-bound only	60 km/h	Mitaka	Tokyo
TB	Mitaka Toll Gate		4.0		Komaki-bound only	80 km/h	Mitaka	Tokyo
BS	Jindaiji Bus Stop		6.0	○		80 km/h	Chōfu	Tokyo
3	Chōfu IC	National Route 20 (Kōshū Kaidō)	7.7			80 km/h	Chōfu	Tokyo
3-1	Inagi IC	Met. Route 9 (Kawasaki Fuchū Route)	10.0		Komaki-bound exit, Takaido-bound entrance only	80 km/h	Fuchū	Tokyo
3-1	Inagi IC	Met. Route 9 (Kawasaki Fuchū Route)	10.0		Komaki-bound exit, Takaido-bound entrance only	100 km/h	Fuchū	Tokyo
BS	Fuchū Bus Stop/ SIC	Met. Route 9 (Kawasaki Fuchū Route)	11.5	○	SIC: Takaido-bound exit, Komaki-bound entrance only	100 km/h	Fuchū	Tokyo
4	Kunitachi-Fuchū IC	National Route 20 (Hino Bypass)	17.0			100 km/h	Kunitachi	Tokyo
BS	Hino Bus Stop		20.0	○		100 km/h	Hino	Tokyo
PA	Ishikawa PA		23.3; 23.5		Takaido-bound; Komaki-bound	100 km/h	Hachiōji	Tokyo
5-1	Hachiōji No.1 Exit	National Route 16 (Hachiōji Bypass)	25.8		Komaki-bound only	100 km/h	Hachiōji	Tokyo
5-2	Hachiōji No.2 Exit	National Route 16	25.8		Komaki-bound only	100 km/h	Hachiōji	Tokyo
5 TB 5	Hachiōji IC; Hachiōji Toll Gate; Hachiōji Exit	National Route 16	25.8		Exit is Takaido-bound only	100 km/h	Hachiōji	Tokyo
BS	Motohachiōji Bus Stop		31.0	○		80 km/h	Hachiōji	Tokyo
-	Motohachiōji IC	Met. Route 61 (Yamada Miyanomae Route)	33.2		open in 2021	80 km/h	Hachiōji	Tokyo
6	Hachiōji JCT	Ken-Ō Expressway	36.0			80 km/h	Hachiōji	Tokyo
7	Sagamiko Higashi Exit	National Route 20	42.4		Komaki-bound only	80 km/h	Sagamihara	Kanagawa
BS	Sagamiko Bus Stop		42.9	○		80 km/h	Sagamihara	Kanagawa
8	Sagamiko IC	National Route 20	45.4			80 km/h	Sagamihara	Kanagawa
PA	Fujino PA		46.5			80 km/h	Sagamihara	Kanagawa
9	Uenohara IC	Pref. Route 35 (Yokkaichiba Uenohara Route)	50.3	○		80 km/h	Uenohara	Yamanashi
SA	Dangōzaka SA/ Nodajiri Bus Stop		55.6		Komaki-bound	80 km/h	Uenohara	Yamanashi
SA	Dangōzaka SA/ Nodajiri Bus Stop		57.7	○	Takaido-bound	80 km/h	Uenohara	Yamanashi
BS	Saruhashi Bus Stop		65.1	○		80 km/h	Ōtsuki	Yamanashi
10	Ōtsuki IC	National Route 20	70.4			80 km/h	Ōtsuki	Yamanashi
11	Ōtsuki JCT	Chūō Expressway (Kawaguchiko Route)	71.4			80 km/h	Ōtsuki	Yamanashi
BS	Magi Bus Stop		72.8	○		80 km/h	Ōtsuki	Yamanashi
PA	Hatsukari PA		74.8			80 km/h	Ōtsuki	Yamanashi
BS	Sasago Bus Stop		78.7	○		80 km/h	Ōtsuki	Yamanashi
BS	Sasago Bus Stop		78.7	○		70 km/h	Ōtsuki	Yamanashi
BS	Kai-Yamato Bus Stop		86.4	○		70 km/h	Kōshū	Yamanashi
12	Katsunuma IC	National Route 20 (Katsunuma Bypass)	90.5			70 km/h	Kōshū	Yamanashi
12	Katsunuma IC	National Route 20 (Katsunuma Bypass)	90.5			80 km/h	Kōshū	Yamanashi
PA	Shakadō PA		92.8	○		80 km/h	Kōshū	Yamanashi
PA	Shakadō PA		92.8	○		80 km/h	Fuefuki	Yamanashi
BS	Kai-Ichinomiya Bus Stop		95.2	○		80 km/h	Fuefuki	Yamanashi
13	Ichinomiya-Misaka IC	National Route 137	96.6			80 km/h	Fuefuki	Yamanashi
BS	Misaka Bus Stop		98.7	○		80 km/h	Fuefuki	Yamanashi
13-1	Fuefuki-Yatsushiro SIC/ Yatsushiro Bus Stop	Pref. Route 22 (Kōfu Fuefuki Route); Pref. Route 313 (Fujinuta Isawa Route)	100.6	○		80 km/h	Fuefuki	Yamanashi
PA	Sakaigawa PA		104.2; 104.5	○	Takaido-bound; Komaki-bound	80 km/h	Fuefuki	Yamanashi
14	Kōfu-minami IC	National Route 358	106.2	○		80 km/h	Kōfu	Yamanashi
-	Kōfu Chūō SIC		108.5		open in 2019	80 km/h	Kōfu	Yamanashi
BS	Shōwa Bus Stop		112.3	○		80 km/h	Shōwa	Yamanashi
15	Kōfu-Shōwa IC	National Route 20 (Kōfu Bypass)	113.8			80 km/h	Shōwa	Yamanashi
15-1	Futaba SA/ SIC/ Futaba-higashi Bus Stop	Pref. Route 6 (Kōfu Nirasaki Route); Pref. Route 25 (Kai Chūō Route)	118.5	○	SIC: Komaki-bound exit, Takaido-bound entrance only	80 km/h	Kai	Yamanashi
15-2	Futaba JCT	Chūbu-Ōdan Expressway	120.4			80 km/h	Kai	Yamanashi
-	Kai IC/ JCT	National Route 20 (Shin-Yamanashi ring road) (planned); Pref. Route 616 (Shimokamijō Miyakubo Emidō Route)			Planned	80 km/h	Kai	Yamanashi
16	Nirasaki IC	Pref. Route 27 (Nirasaki Shōsenkyō Route)	125.0			80 km/h	Nirasaki	Yamanashi
BS	Akeno Bus Stop		129.5	○		80 km/h	Hokuto	Yamanashi
17	Sutama IC	National Route 141	132.0			80 km/h	Hokuto	Yamanashi
17	Sutama IC	National Route 141	132.0			70 km/h	Hokuto	Yamanashi
BS	Nagasaka-Takane Bus Stop		140.1	○		70 km/h	Hokuto	Yamanashi
17-1	Nagasaka IC	Pref. Route 32 (Nagasaka Takane Route)	140.7			70 km/h	Hokuto	Yamanashi
17-1	Nagasaka IC	Pref. Route 32 (Nagasaka Takane Route)	140.7			80 km/h	Hokuto	Yamanashi
-	Nagasaka JCT	Chūbu-Ōdan Expressway (Planned)			Planned	80 km/h	Hokuto	Yamanashi
PA	Yatsugatake PA		143.1	○		80 km/h	Hokuto	Yamanashi
18	Kobuchisawa IC	Pref. Route 11 (Hokuto Fujimi Route)	148.9			80 km/h	Fujimi	Nagano
BS	Fujimi Bus Stop		157.7	○		80 km/h	Fujimi	Nagano
19	Suwa-minami IC	Pref. Route 425 (Haraizawa Fujimi Route); Pref. Route 90 (Suwa-minami Inter Route)	161.5			80 km/h	Fujimi	Nagano
PA	Chūōdō-Hara PA		163.8	○	Komaki-bound	80 km/h	Hara	Nagano
PA	Chūōdō-Hara PA		164.6		Takaido-bound	80 km/h	Hara	Nagano
BS	Chino Bus Stop		169.9	○		80 km/h	Chino	Nagano
20	Suwa IC	National Route 20 (Suwa Bypass)	172.6			80 km/h	Suwa	Nagano
BS	Aruga Bus Stop		177.3	○		80 km/h	Suwa	Nagano
SA	Suwako SA		178.5			80 km/h	Suwa	Nagano
SA	Suwako SA		178.5			80 km/h	Okaya	Nagano
21	Okaya JCT	Nagano Expressway	182.7		From Okaya JCT to Komaki JCT the Chūō Expressway is signed "E19"	80 km/h	Okaya	Nagano
BS	Kawagishi Bus Stop		186.0	○		80 km/h	Okaya	Nagano
PA	Tatsuno PA		192.7	○		80 km/h	Tatsuno	Nagano
22	Ihoku IC	National Route 153	196.7	○		80 km/h	Tatsuno	Nagano
22	Ihoku IC	National Route 153	196.7	○		80 km/h	Minowa	Nagano
BS	Minowa Bus Stop		200.5	○		80 km/h	Minowa	Nagano
23	Ina IC	Pref. Route 476 (Ina Inter Nishiminowa Route); Pref. Route 87 (Ina Inter Route)	206.2	○		80 km/h	Minamiminowa	Nagano
23	Ina IC	Pref. Route 476 (Ina Inter Nishiminowa Route); Pref. Route 87 (Ina Inter Route)	206.2	○		80 km/h	Ina	Nagano
23-1	Ogurogawa PA/ SIC		209.1			80 km/h	Ina	Nagano
BS	Nishiharuchika Bus Stop		212.2	○		80 km/h	Ina	Nagano
BS	Miyada Bus Stop		217.4	○		80 km/h	Miyada	Nagano
24	Komagane IC	Pref. Route 75 (Komagane Komagatake Kōen Route)	221.4	○		80 km/h	Komagane	Nagano
24-1	Komagatake SA/ SIC		224.7			80 km/h	Komagane	Nagano
BS	Iijima Bus Stop		228.7	○		80 km/h	Iijima	Nagano
25	Matsukawa IC	Pref. Route 15 (Iijima Iida Route); Pref. Route 59 (Matsukawa Inter Ōshika Route)	236.7	○		80 km/h	Matsukawa	Nagano
BS	Takamori Bus Stop		243.1	○		80 km/h	Takamori	Nagano
PA	Zakōji PA		245.3			80 km/h	Iida	Nagano
BS	Kamiiida Bus Stop		248.9	○		80 km/h	Iida	Nagano
26	Iida IC/ Igara Bus Stop	National Route 153 (Iida Bypass)	252.2	○		80 km/h	Iida	Nagano
26-1	Iida-Yamamoto IC	San-en Nanshin Expressway	257.4			80 km/h	Iida	Nagano
PA	Achi PA/ Komaba Bus Stop		259.8	○		80 km/h	Achi	Nagano
PA	Achi PA/ Komaba Bus Stop		259.8	○		70 km/h	Achi	Nagano
26-1	Sonohara IC	Pref. Route 89 (Sonohara Inter Route); Pref. Route 477 (Fujimidai Kōen Route)	267.0	○	Takaido-bound exit, Komaki-bound entrance only	70 km/h	Achi	Nagano
TN	Enasan Tunnel		271.0		Length - 8,649 m, dangerous goods forbidden	70 km/h	Achi	Nagano
TN	Enasan Tunnel		271.0		Length - 8,649 m, dangerous goods forbidden	70 km/h	Nakatsugawa	Gifu
PA	Misaka PA/ Magome Bus Stop		278.9	○		80 km/h	Nakatsugawa	Gifu
27	Nakatsugawa IC	National Route 19	288.9	○		80 km/h	Nakatsugawa	Gifu
SA	Enakyō SA		294.4			80 km/h	Ena	Gifu
28	Ena IC	Pref. Route 68 (Ena Shirakawa Route)	298.3	○		80 km/h	Ena	Gifu
PA	Byōbuzan PA		310.2; 311.4		Takaido-bound; Komaki-bound	80 km/h	Mizunami	Gifu
BS	Mizunami-Tentoku Bus Stop		314.8	○		80 km/h	Mizunami	Gifu
29	Mizunami IC	Pref. Route 47 (Mizunami Inter Route)	316.4			80 km/h	Mizunami	Gifu
30	Toki IC	National Route 21	320.9	○		80 km/h	Toki	Gifu
30-1	Toki JCT	Tōkai-Kanjō Expressway	323.4			80 km/h	Toki	Gifu
PA	Kokeizan PA		327.9		Takaido-bound only	80 km/h	Tajimi	Gifu
31	Tajimi IC	National Route 248	329.7	○		80 km/h	Tajimi	Gifu
PA	Utsutsutōge PA		336.2			80 km/h	Kasugai	Aichi
32	Komaki-higashi IC	Pref. Route 49 (Kasugai Inuyama Route)	337.8			80 km/h	Komaki	Aichi
BS	Tōkadai Bus Stop		343.0	○		80 km/h	Komaki	Aichi
23	Komaki JCT	Tōmei Expressway	344.9			80 km/h	Komaki	Aichi

- Changing areas for snow chains
  - Achi PA - Sonohara IC
  - Hatsukari PA - Katsunuma IC
  - Sutama IC - Nagasaka IC (Komaki-bound)
  - Yatsugatake PA - Kobuchisawa IC (Two areas Komaki-bound)
  - Kobuchisawa IC - Suwa-minami IC
  - Okaya JCT - Tatsuno PA

=== Kawaguchiko Route ===
No.	Name	Connections	Dist. from Takaido IC	Bus Stop	Notes	Location (all in Yamanashi)
11	Ōtsuki JCT	Chūō Expressway	71.4			Ōtsuki
BS	Ogatayama Bus Stop		73.2	○		Tsuru
1	Tsuru IC	Pref. Route 705 (Takahatake Yamura Teishajō Route); Pref. Route 40 (Tsuru Inter Route)	77.6	○	Fujiyoshida-bound exit, Ōtsuki-bound entrance only	Tsuru
PA	Yamura PA		79.4; 79.7		Ōtsuki-bound; Fujiyoshida-bound	Tsuru
BS	Nishikatsura Bus Stop		84.7	○		Nishikatsura
BS	Shimoyoshida Bus Stop		89.8	○		Fujiyoshida
1-1	Fujiyoshida-Nishikatsura SIC	Pref. Route 718 (Fujiyoshida Nishikatsura Route)	93.9			Fujiyoshida
2	Kawaguchiko IC	National Route 139	93.9		Fujiyoshida-bound exit, Ōtsuki-bound entrance only	Fujikawaguchiko
Through to Higashifuji-goko Road

- The speed limit on the Kawaguchiko Route is 80 km/h.
- To prevent confusion with the main route, kilometer markers along the Kawaguchiko Route show the distance from Takaido Interchange plus 300 (the marker at Ōtsuki Junction is 371.4 while the marker at Kawaguchiko Interchange is 393.9)

== In popular culture ==
The Chūō Expressway features prominently in the song "Chūō Freeway" (中央フリーウェイ) by Yumi Matsutoya, from the 1976 studio album The 14th Moon. The song describes the scenery along the highway in the vicinity of Fuchū, Tokyo.
