= Chūbu-Ōdan Expressway =

Motorway in Japan

Chūbu-Ōdan Expressway
- 中部横断自動車道

Route information
- Existed: 2002–present

Major junctions
- South end: Shin-Shimizu Junction in Shimizu-ku, Shizuoka; New Tōmei Expressway (35.0488°N 138.4879°E)
- North end: Saku-Komoro Junction in Saku, Nagano; Jōshin-etsu Expressway (35.6883°N 138.4942°E)

Location
- Country: Japan
- Major cities: Minami-Alps, Kai, Hokuto

Highway system
- National highways of Japan; Expressways of Japan

The Chūbu-Ōdan Expressway (中部横断自動車道, Chūbu Ōdan Jidōsha-dō; lit. 'Trans-Chūbu Expressway') is a national expressway in Japan. It is managed by East Nippon Expressway Company and Central Nippon Expressway Company.

== Overview ==
The expressway is planned to commence in the city of Shizuoka and terminate in Saku, Nagano The route crosses (横断, ōdan) the mountainous Chūbu region, connecting Shizuoka, Yamanashi, and Nagano prefectures. Together with the Jōshin-etsu Expressway, the route forms a link connecting the coastline of the Japan Sea with that of the Pacific Ocean.

As of March 2008, most of the route is either under construction or still in the planning stages. Most of the incomplete areas will be built according to the New Direct Control System, whereby the financial burden for construction will be shared by both national and local governments and will be operated as toll-free roads upon completion.

== List of interchanges and features ==
- IC - interchange, JCT - junction, PA - parking area, BS - bus stop, TB - toll plaza

No.	Name	Connections	Dist. from Origin	Dist. from Terminus	Bus Stop	Notes	Location	
(9)	Shin-Shimizu JCT	New Tōmei Expressway	0.0	74.5			Shimizu-ku, Shizuoka	Shizuoka
TB	Tomizawa Toll Plaza		20.5	52.0			Nanbu	Yamanashi
1	Tomizawa IC	National Route 52	20.7	51.8		New Direct Control System	Nanbu	Yamanashi
2	Nanbu IC	National Route 52 (Nanbu Bypass)	27.4	45.1		New Direct Control System	Nanbu	Yamanashi
2-2	Minobusan IC	Pref. Route 10 (Fujikawa Minobu Route)				New Direct Control System	Minobu	Yamanashi
3	Shimobe-onsen Hayakawa IC	Pref. Route 9 (Ichikawamisato Minobu Route)	39.4	33.1		New Direct Control System	Minobu	Yamanashi
3-2	Nakatomi IC	Pref. Route 405 (Wariko Kiriishi Route)	-	-		New Direct Control System	Minobu	Yamanashi
4	Rokugō IC	Pref. Route 9 (Ichikawamisato Minobu Route); Pref. Route 43 (Rokugō Interchange Route)	49.2	23.3			Ichikawamisato	Yamanashi
TB	Fujikawa Toll Plaza		↓	↑		Opens in 2016	Fujikawa	Yamanashi
5 <PA>	Masuho IC/PA	National Route 52 (Kōsai Road); National Route 140	58.5	16.0		PA Opens in 2016	Fujikawa	Yamanashi
TB	Minami-Alps Toll Plaza		↓	↑		Temporary - Closes in 2016	Minami-Alps	Yamanashi
6	Minami-Alps IC	Shin-Yamanashi ring road Pref. Route 12 (Nirasaki Minami-Alps Chūō Route)	64.7	9.8			Minami-Alps	Yamanashi
7	Shirane IC	Shin-Yamanashi ring road Pref. Route 39 (Imasuwa Kitamura Route); National Route 52 (Kōsai Road)	67.7	6.8			Minami-Alps	Yamanashi
(15-2)	Futaba JCT	Chūō Expressway	74.5	0.0			Kai	Yamanashi
Concurrent with Chūō Expressway
(<17-2>)	Nagasaka JCT	Chūō Expressway				Planned	Hokuto	Yamanashi
-	Takane IC					Planned	Hokuto	Yamanashi
-	Minamimaki IC					Planned	Minamimaki	Nagano
-	Koumi IC					Planned	Koumi	Nagano
-	Yachiho-Kogen IC	National Route 299	0.0	23.1		New Direct Control System	Sakuho	Nagano
-	Sakuho IC	National Route 141	4.5	18.6		New Direct Control System	Sakuho	Nagano
-	Saku-Usuda IC	Pref. Route 121 (Kamiotagiri Usuda Teishajō Route)	6.9	16.2		New Direct Control System	Saku	Nagano
-	Saku-minami IC	National Route 142	14.6	8.5		New Direct Control System	Saku	Nagano
-	Saku-Nakasato IC	Pref. Route 154 (Shionada Saku Route)	17.6	5.5		New Direct Control System	Saku	Nagano
-	Saku-kita IC	National Route 141	21.8	1.3		New Direct Control System	Saku	Nagano
TB	Komoro-Mikage Toll Plaza		22.6	0.5			Saku	Nagano
(7-1)	Saku-Komoro JCT	Jōshin-etsu Expressway	23.1	0.0			Saku	Nagano
