= Japan National Route 412 =

Road in Kanagawa prefecture, Japan

National Route 412
- 国道412号
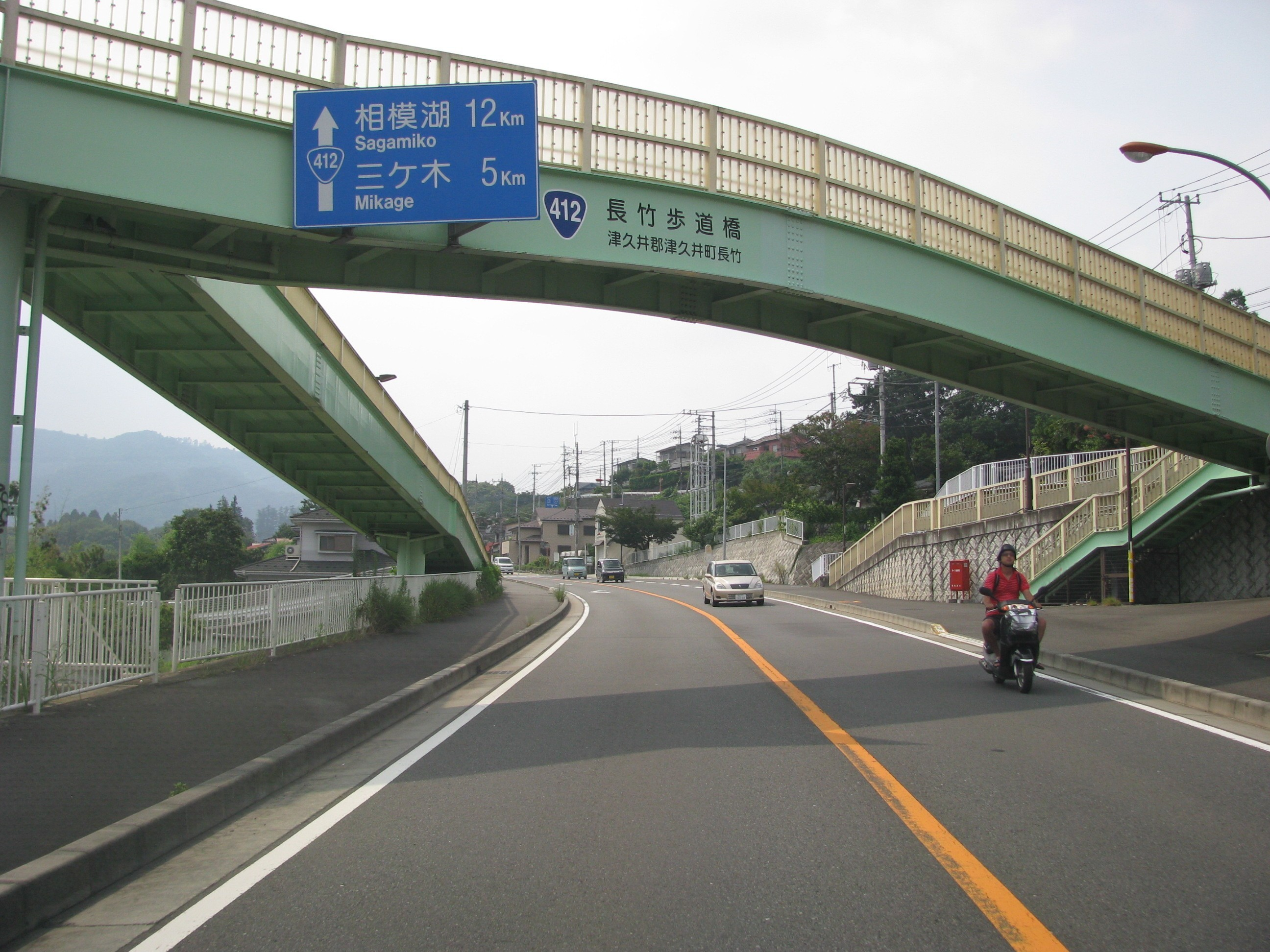

Route information
- Length: 48.6 km (30.2 mi)

Location
- Country: Japan

Highway system
- National highways of Japan; Expressways of Japan
← National Route 411	→ National Route 413

National Route 412 is a national highway of Japan connecting Hiratsuka, Kanagawa and Sagamihara, Kanagawa via Atsugi, with a total length of 48.6 km (30.2 mi).
