= Japan National Route 300 =

Road in Yamanashi prefecture, Japan

National Route 300
- 国道300号
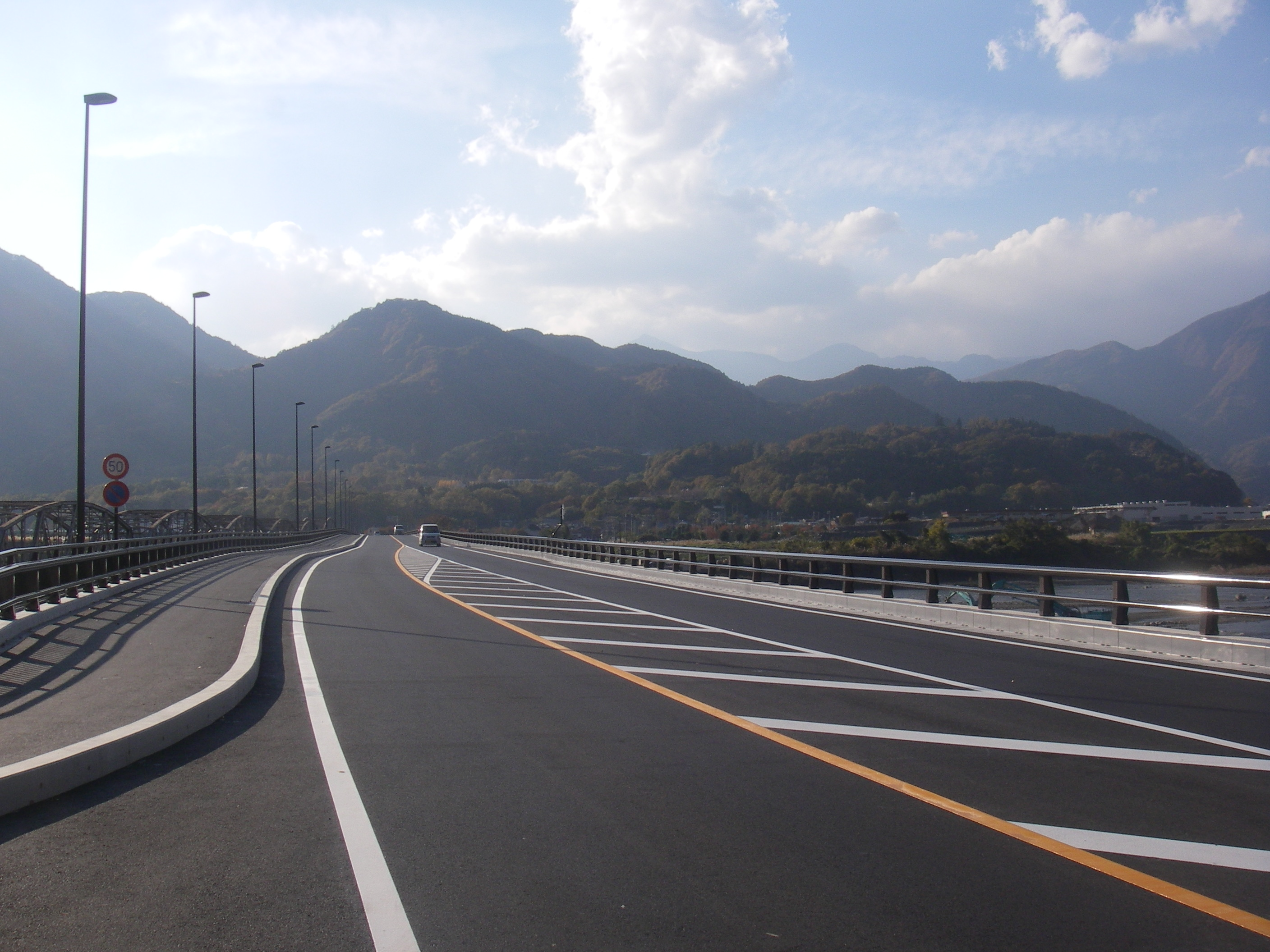

Route information
- Length: 48.2 km (30.0 mi)

Location
- Country: Japan

Highway system
- National highways of Japan; Expressways of Japan
← National Route 299	→ National Route 301

National Route 300 is a national highway of Japan connecting Fujiyoshida and Minobu in Yamanashi prefecture, with a total length of 48.2 km (29.95 mi).
