= Japan National Route 52 =

National highway in Japan

National Route 52
- 国道52号

Route information
- Length: 100.1 km (62.2 mi)
- Existed: 1 April 1963–present

Major junctions
- North end: National Route 411 in Kōfu
- South end: National Route 1 in Shimizu-ku, Shizuoka

Location
- Country: Japan

Highway system
- National highways of Japan; Expressways of Japan
← National Route 51	→ National Route 53

National Route 52 is a national highway of Japan connecting Shimizu-ku, Shizuoka and Kōfu.

== Route data ==
- Length: 100.1 km (62.2 mi).

== History ==
Route 52 was originally designated on 18 May 1953 as a section of National Route 141. After it was extended to Kōfu, this section was redesignated as Route 52 when the route was promoted to a Class 1 highway.
