= Japan National Route 413 =

Road in Japan

National Route 413
- 国道413号
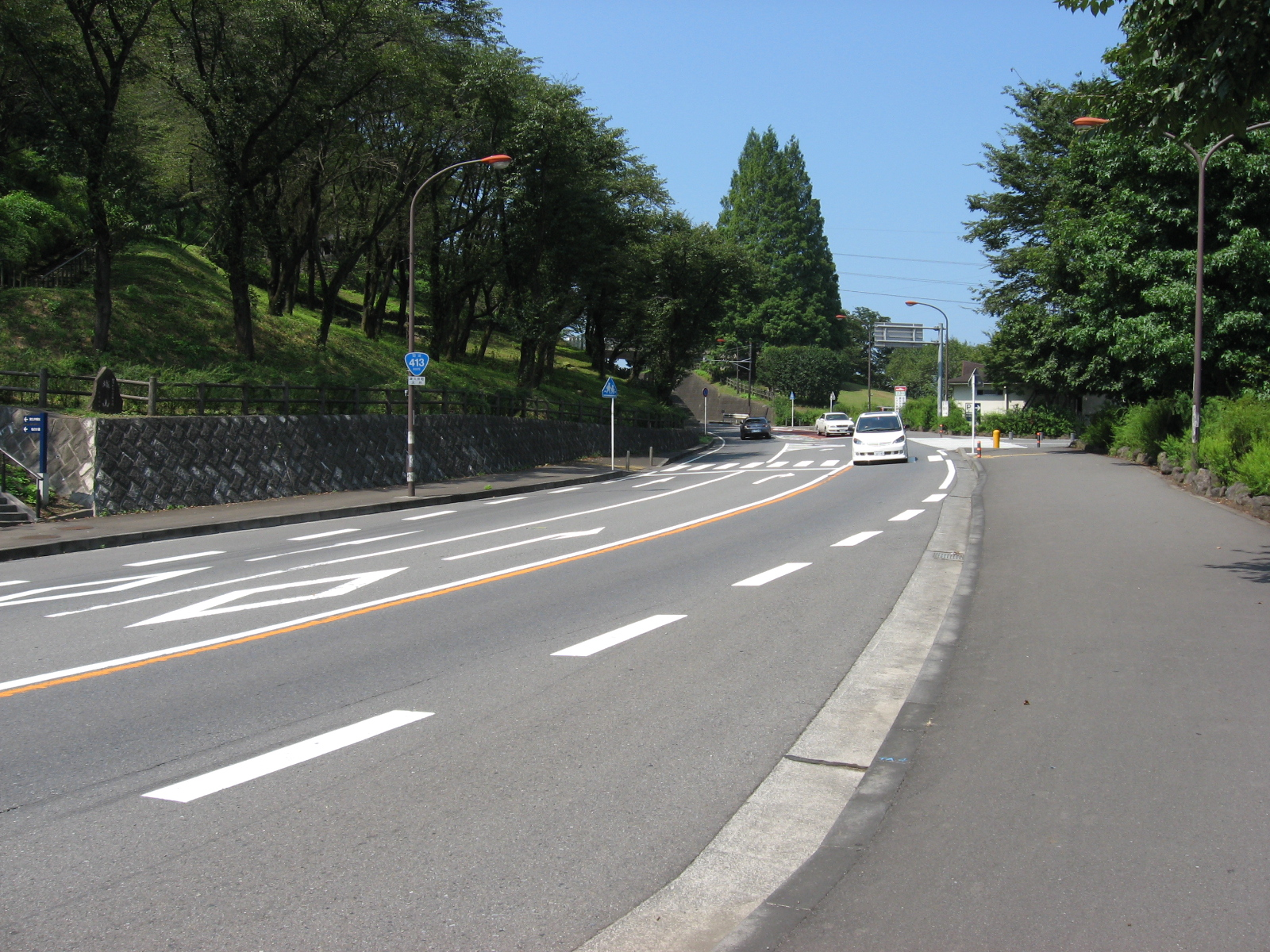

Route information
- Length: 71.7 km (44.6 mi)

Location
- Country: Japan

Highway system
- National highways of Japan; Expressways of Japan
← National Route 412	→ National Route 414

National Route 413 is a national highway of Japan connecting Fujiyoshida, Yamanashi and Sagamihara, Kanagawa in Japan, with a total length of 71.7 km (44.55 mi).

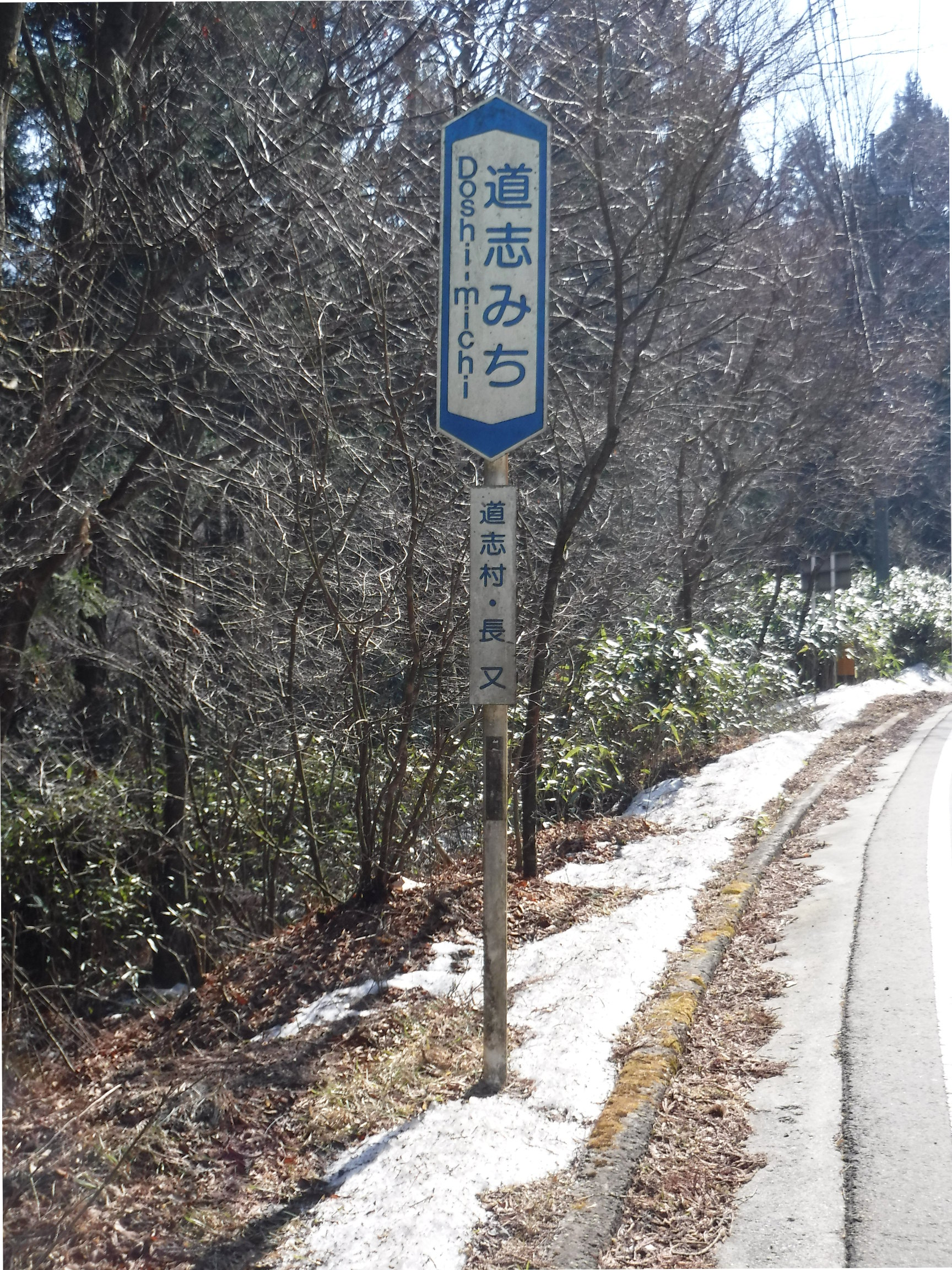
Reminder (in Nagamata, Dōshi) that this is Dōshi-michi

The road goes through Dōshi, and for some of its length is also known as Dōshi-michi (i.e. the Dōshi road).
