= Japan National Route 139 =

Road in Japan

National Route 139
- 国道139号
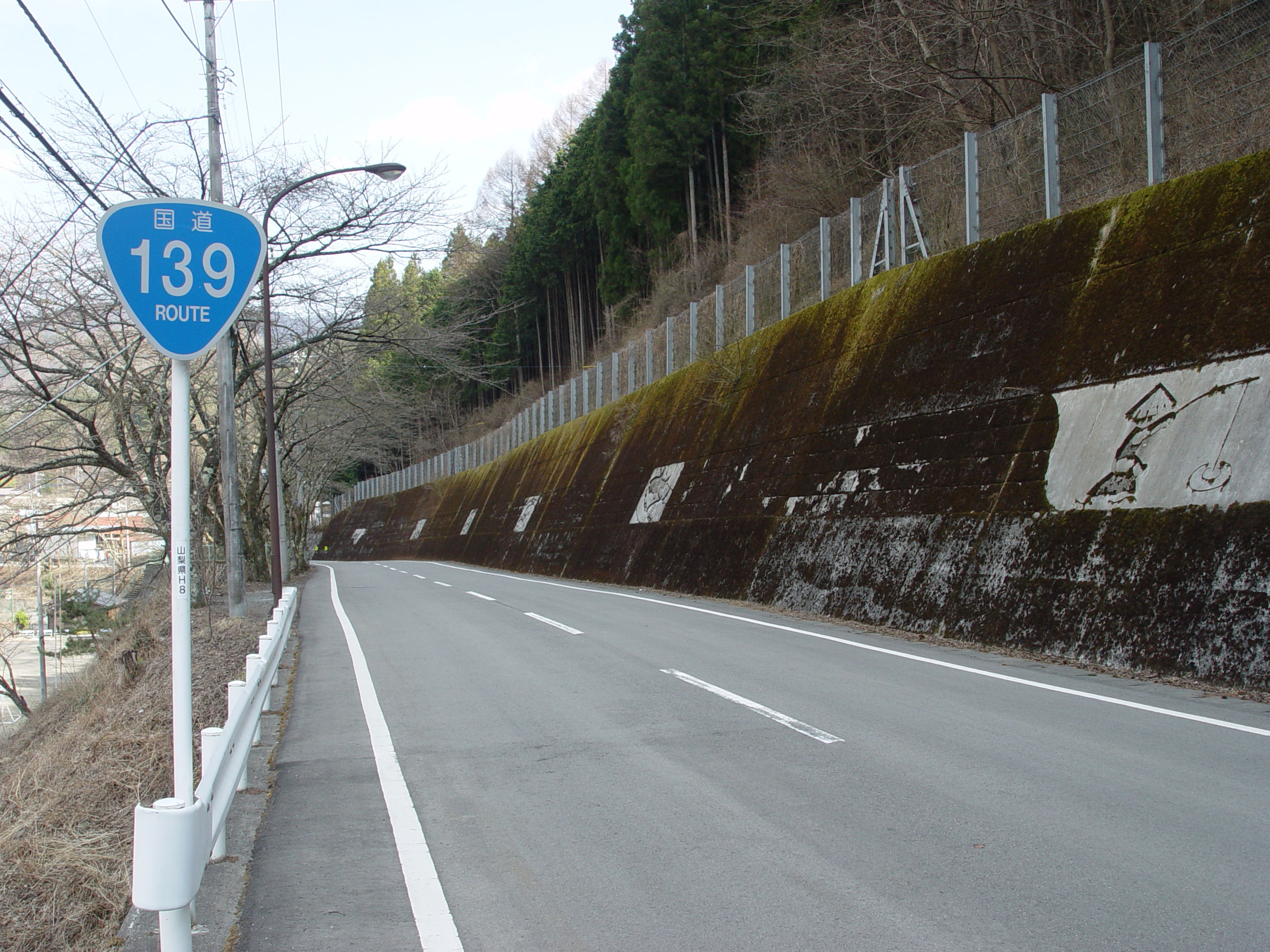

Route information
- Length: 134.4 km (83.5 mi)
- Existed: 1953–present

Major junctions
- South end: National Route 1 in Fuji, Shizuoka
- North end: National Route 411 in Okutama, Tokyo

Location
- Country: Japan

Highway system
- National highways of Japan; Expressways of Japan
← National Route 138	→ National Route 140

National Route 139 is a national highway of Japan connecting Fuji, Shizuoka and Okutama, Tokyo in Japan, with a total length of 134.4 km (83.51 mi).
