= Shinjuku Highway Bus Terminal =

Bus station in Tokyo, Japan

Coordinates: 35°41′23.5″N 139°41′54″E

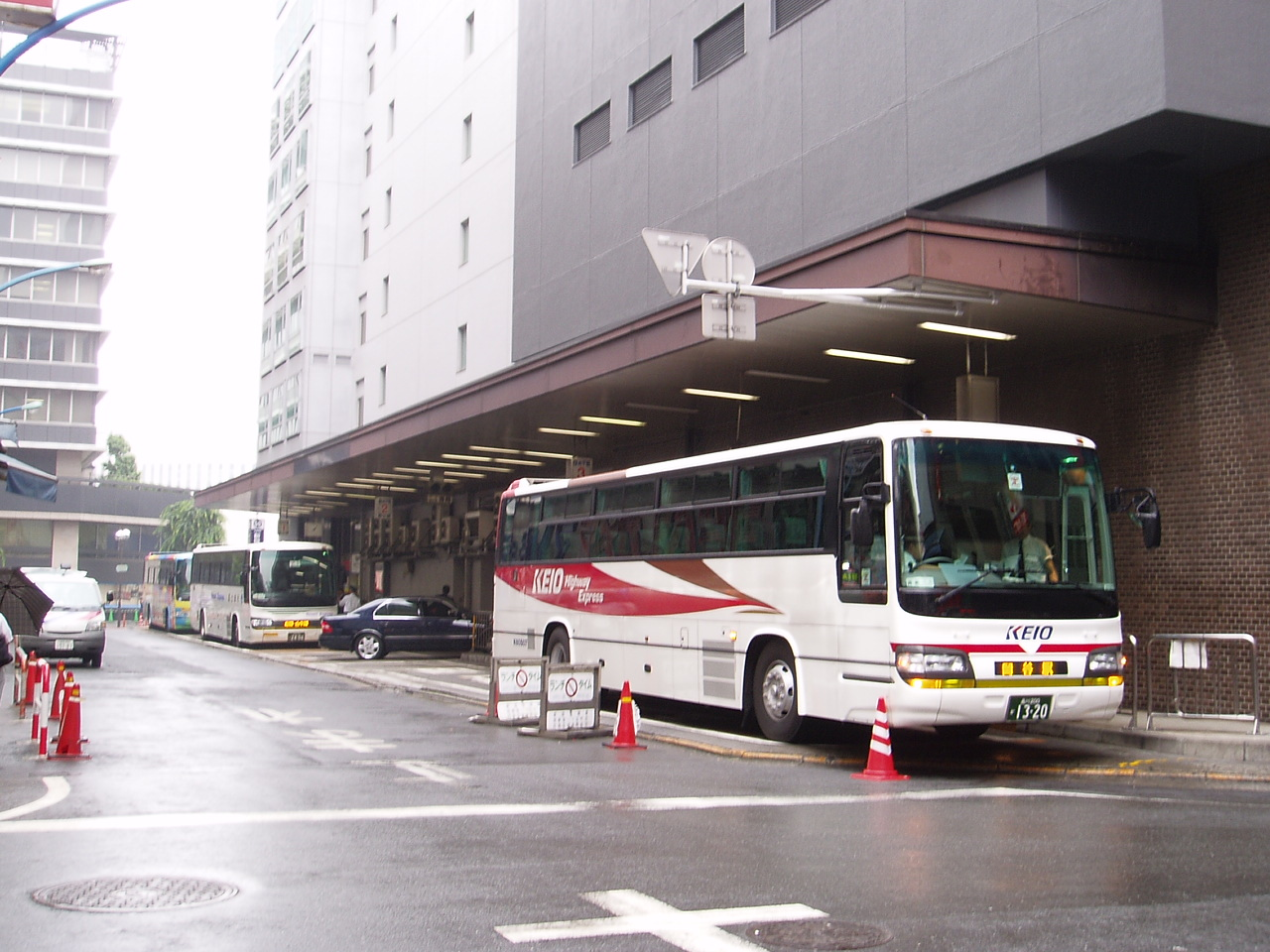
Shinjuku Highway Bus Terminal, June 2006

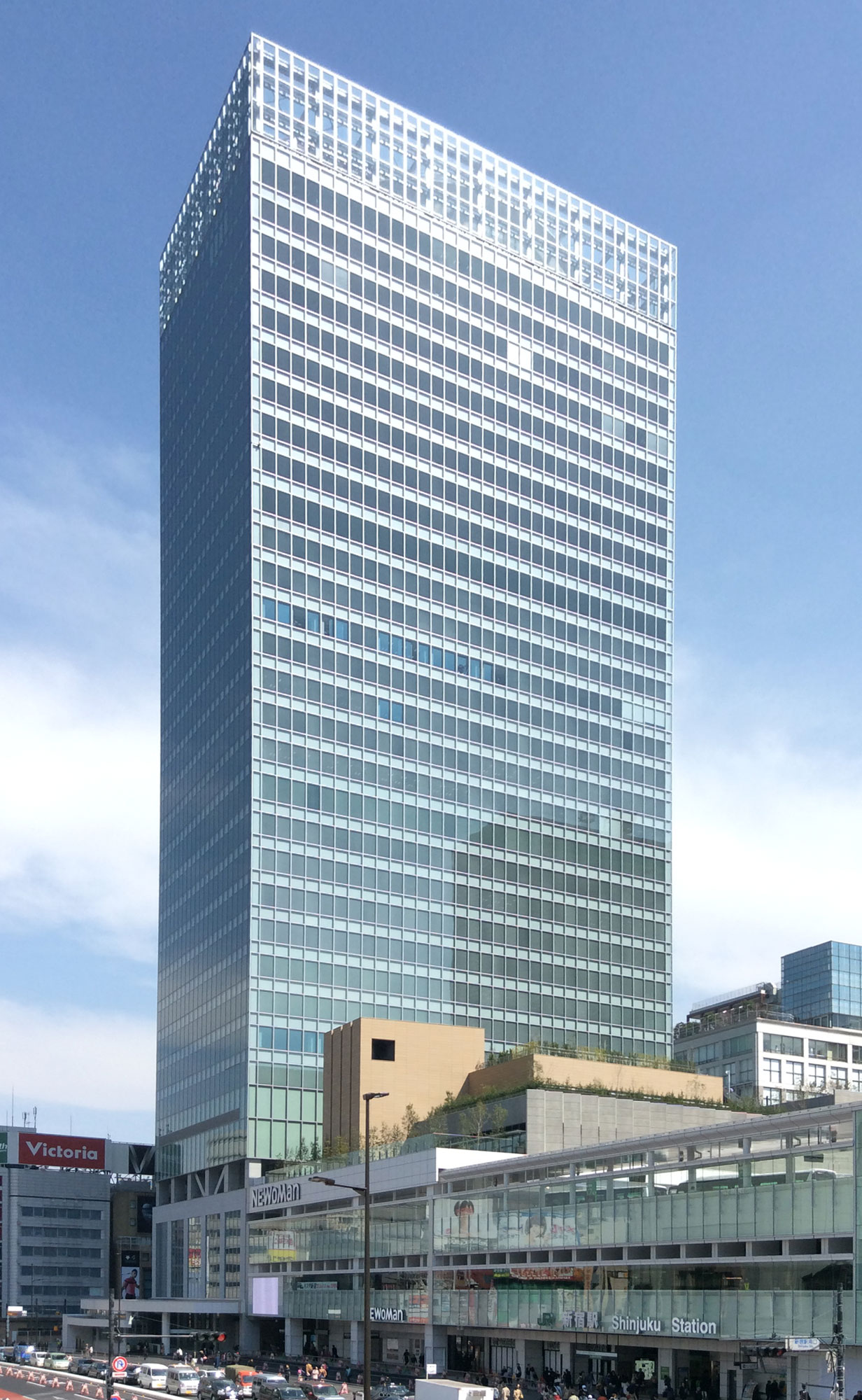
JR Shinjuku Miraina Tower

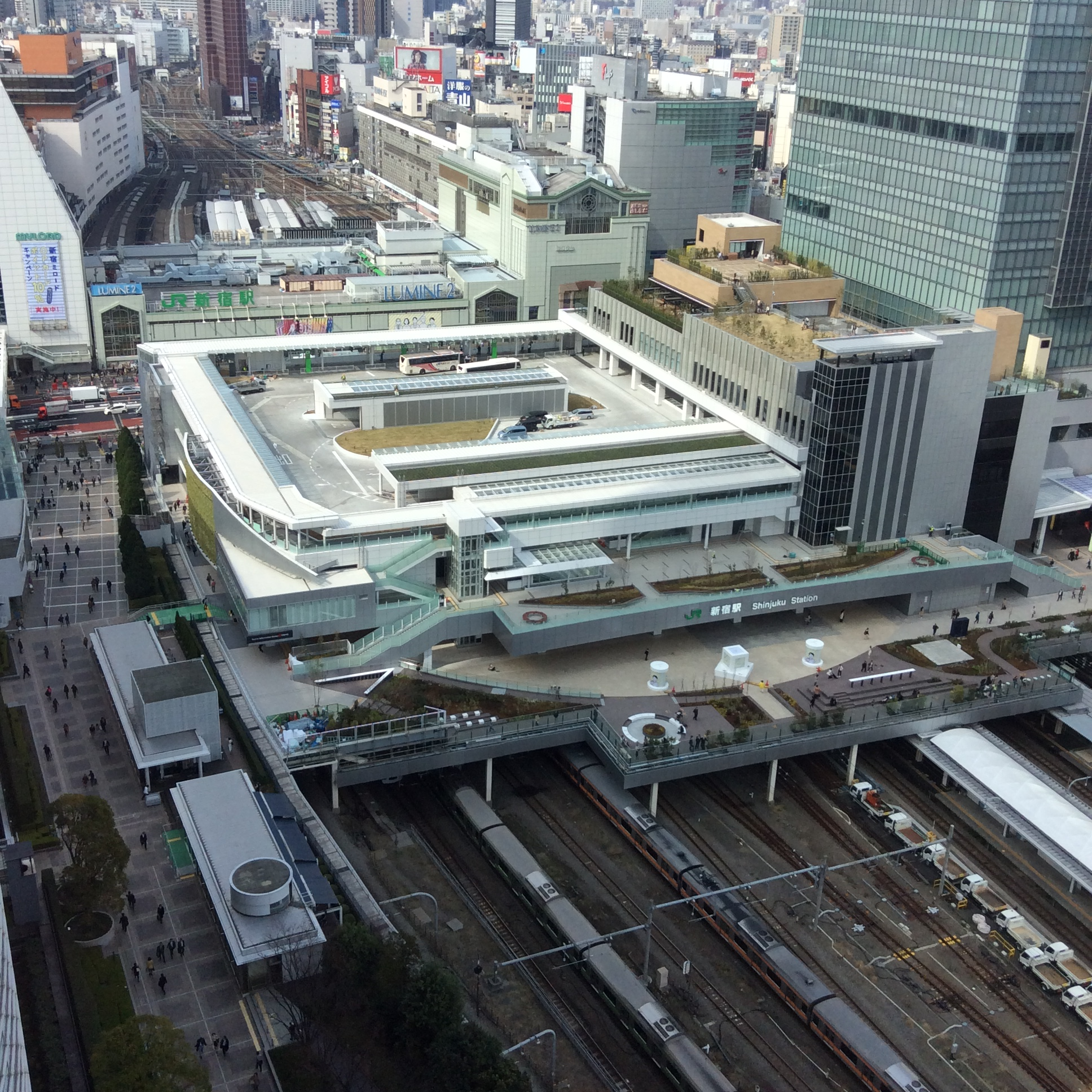
New bus terminal established together with JR Shinjuku Miraina Tower, March 2016

Shinjuku Highway Bus Terminal (新宿高速バスターミナル, Shinjuku Kōsoku-basu Tāminaru) was a bus terminal once operated by Keio Bus, in Nishishinjuku, Shinjuku, Tokyo, Japan. This bus terminal has been closed and replaced with the much larger South exit dedicated bus terminal which houses all companies under one roof and unifies ticketing systems and signage. Previously, each company had their own terminal serving the station. The new terminal, known as Busta for short, is the nation's largest bus terminal.

== Outline ==
The bus terminal is located on the first (ground) floor of MY Shinjuku No. 2 Building of Meiji Yasuda Life Insurance Company, near the west exit of Shinjuku Station and in front of Yodobashi Camera Shinjuku West shop.

The bus terminal serves mainly Keio Group bus routes, such as Chūō Kōsoku Bus, including those operated jointly with other companies. The terminal facilities include ticket windows to sell bus tickets.

The bus terminal was opened in 1971.

On April 4, 2016, the new bus terminal and commercial facilities nearby south exit has opened. The coaches and the airport buses started to depart from the new terminal.

== Routes ==
=== Keio Bus ===
- Chuo Kosoku Bus
  - Fuji-Goko Line; For Fuji-Q Highland, Kawaguchiko Station, Yamanakako, and Motosuko / with Fujikyu
  - The 5th uphill of Mt. Fuji Line; For Mount Fuji/5th with Fujikyu
  - Kofu Line; For Kōfu Station, Ryūō Station / with Fujikyu Yamanashi Bus and Yamanashi Kotsu
  - Minami-ALPS City /Minobu Line; For Minobu, Kuon-ji / with Yamanashi Kotsu
  - Chuo / Minami-ALPS Line (Minami-ALPS Eco Park Liner) For Tatomi, Hatta / with Yamanashi Kōtsū
  - Suwa / Okaya Line; For Suwa, Okaya, Chino / with Suwa Bus, Fuji Express, Yamanashi Kotsu and JR Bus Kanto
  - Ina Line; For Ina, Komagane /with Fuji Express, Ina Bus, Yamanashi Kotsu and Shinnan Kotsu
  - Iida Line; For Komagane, Matsukawa, Iida/ with Suwa Bus, Ina Bus and Shinnan Kotsu
  - Kisofukushima Line; For Kiso-Fukushima Station / with Ontake Kotsu
  - Matsumoto Line; For Matsumoto Bus Terminal / with Matsumoto Electric Railway
  - Hakuba Line; For Shinano-Ōmachi Station, Hakuba Station, Hakuba Happo / with Kawanakajima Bus
  - HidaTakayama Line; For Hirayu, Takayama Station / with Nohi Bus
  - Nagoya Line; For Nakatsugawa, Sakae, Nagoya Station / with Meitetsu Bus
- Nagano Line; For Nagano Station, Zenkō-ji / with Kawanakajima Bus
- Osaka (Hankyu Umeda) Line; For Nagaokakyō, Senri-Chūō Station, Shin-Osaka Station, and Umeda Station / with Hankyu Bus
- Kobe/Himeji Line (Princess Road); For Sannomiya, Kakogawa, Himeji / with Shinki Bus
- Sendai/Ishinomaki Line (Hirose Liner); For Sendai, Ishinomaki Station / with Miyagi Transportation
- Mishima/Numazu Line; For Susono, Mishima, Numazu / with Fujikyu City Bus
- Shizuoka Line (Shibuya/Shinjuku Liner Shizuoka); For Shimizu, Kusanagi, Shizuoka Station / with JR Tokai Bus
- Hamamatsu Line (Shibuya/Shinjuku Liner Hamamatsu); For Hamamatsu Station / with JR Tokai Bus, Enshū Railway
- Toke Line; For Tokyo Skytree, Chiba, Kamatori Station, Honda Station, and Toke Station / with Chiba Chuo Bus

=== Fujikyu ===
- Koshu/Enzan Line (Koshu Wine Liner) For Katsunuma, Enzan, Yamanashi
- Sanagmiko Line; For Sagamiko

=== Alpico Kōtsū ===
- Kamikochi Line (Sawayaka Shinshu); For Shi-Shimashima Station, Kamikōchi

=== Nishi Tokyo Bus ===
- Osaka (Abenobashi) Line (Twinkle); For Ibaraki Station, Osaka Station, Namba Station, Ōsaka Abenobashi Station / with Kintetsu Bus
- Takamatsu/Marugame Line (Hello Bridge); For Takamatsu, Sakaide Station, Zentsūji. Marugame Station / with Shikoku Kousoku Bus
- Matsuyama Line (Orange Liner Ehime); For Dōgo Onsen, Matsuyama City Station, Iyoshi Station, Yawatahama Station / with Iyo Railway
- Summer Land Line; For Tokyo Summer Land

=== Kanto Bus ===
- Tenri/Nara Line (Yamato); For Tenri Station, Nara Station, Kintetsu Nara Station/ with Nara Kotsu
- Tenri/Takada/Gojo Line (Yamato); For Tenri Station, Yamato-Yagi Station, Yamato-Takada Station, Gose Station, Oshimi Station, Gojō / with Nara Kotsu
- Kyoto/Hirakata Line (Tokyo Midnight Express Kyoto); For Yamashina Station, Sanjō, Kyoto Station, Hirakatashi Station / with Keihan Bus
- Okayama/Kurashiki Line (Muscat); For Tsuyama, Okayama Station, Kurashiki / with Ryobi Bus
- Toyohashi Line (Shinjuku/Toyohashi Express Honokuni); For Toyokawa, Toyohashi, Mikawa Tahara Station / with Toyotetsu Bus

=== Kintetsu Bus ===
- Osaka (Abenobashi) Line (Casual Twinkle); For Ibaraki, Osaka Station, Namba, Abenobashi

=== Nishitetsu ===
- Fukuoka Line (Hakata) For Kokura Station, Nishitetsu Fukuoka (Tenjin) Station, Hakata Station

=== Konan Bus ===
- Hirosaki/Goshogawara Line (Panda); For Hirosaki, Goshogawara Station
- Hachinohe/Aomori Line (Emburi); For Hachinohe Station, Towada, Shichinohe-Towada, Noheji Station, Kominato Station, and Aomori Station
- Aomori Line (Tsugaru); For Aomori Station

=== Kokusai Kogyo Bus ===
- Sakata Line (Yuuhi); For Shōnai, Tsuruoka Station, Amarume Station, Sakata / with Shonai Kotsu
- Mutsu Line (Shimokita); For Hachinohe Station, Misawa Station, Noheji, Yokohama, Shimokita Station, Mutsu City Office

=== Kaifu Kanko ===
- Tokushima Line (My Repeat, My Flora); For Matsushige, Tokushima Station, Komatsushima, Anan

== Other cities ==
Bus Terminals bearing designation "Highway" are few in Japan, they are: ja:福島高速バスターミナル (Fukushima City), ja:阪急三番街高速バスターミナル (Hankyu Sanban), ja:京王八王子高速バスターミナル (Keio Hachioji), ja:西鉄天神高速バスターミナル (Nishitetsu Tenjin), ja:なんば高速バスターミナル (Namba Osaka). Needless to say, long distance buses serve hundreds of stations without such designation.
