= Matsumoto Bus Terminal =

Bus terminal in Matsumoto, Nagano, Japan

Coordinates: 36°13′49″N 137°58′0.1″E

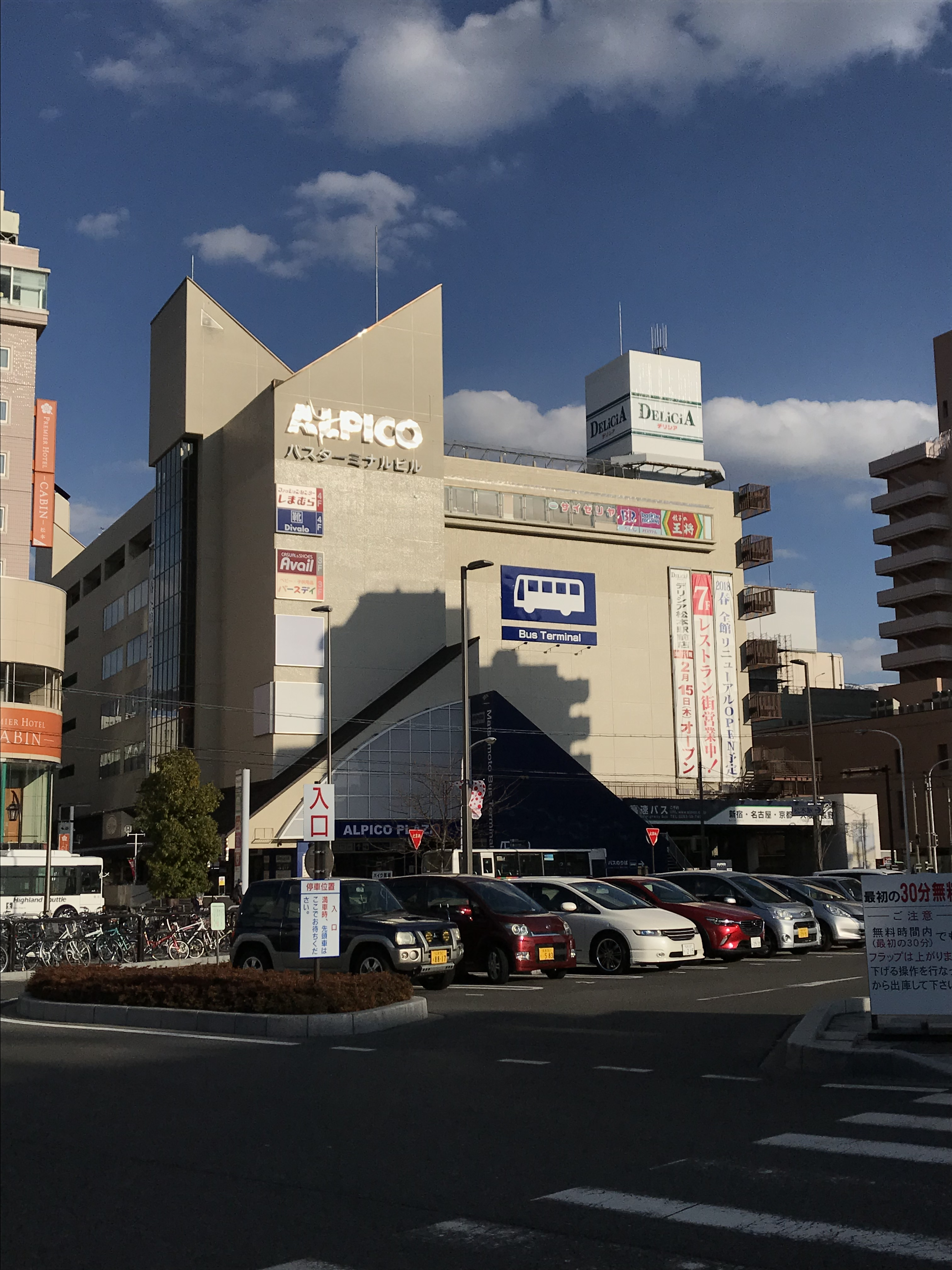

General information
- Location: Japan
- Operator: Alpico Kōtsū
Location

Matsumoto Bus Terminal (松本バスターミナル, Matsumoto Basu Tāminaru) is a bus terminal to the east of Matsumoto Station in Matsumoto, Nagano, Japan, managed by Alpico Kōtsū.

== Outline ==
This bus terminal is on the ground floor of "Matsuden Bus Terminal Building" (Note: "Matsuden" is abbreviation of Matsumoto Dentetsu) which Alpico Kotsu owns and manages. "ALPICO PLAZA" is also on the building.

== Lines ==
=== Commuter Lines ===
- Track 1
  - Shindai-Yokota Cycle Line
  - Asama Line
- Track 2
  - Yokota-Shindai Cycle Line
  - Shin-Asama Line
- Track 3
  - Utsukushigahara-Spa Line
  - Iriyamabe Line
  - Shiga Line
  - Alps-Park Line
- Track 4
  - Kotobukidai Line
  - Uchida Line
  - Namiyanagi Danchi Line
- Track 5
  - Airport-Asahi Line
  - Kambayashi-Mizushiro Line
  - Yamagata Line
  - Kakeyu-Spa Line (Note: Passengers are able to transfer onto Chikuma Bus bound for Ueda Station (Nagano) at Kakeyu Onsen bus stop.) (Runs on weekdays)
  - Misayama Line
  - Nakayama Line

=== Highway Lines ===
- Track 6
  - Chuo Highway Bus Matsumoto Line; For Shinjuku Highway Bus Terminal
  - Chuodo Highway Bus Matsumoto Line; For Nagoya
  - Osaka Line (Alpin Matsumoto) For Kyōto, Ōsaka
- Track 7
  - For Kawaguchiko Station, Fuji-Q Highland
  - For Ueda Station (Nagano) (Runs on holidays and all days of August. Passengers are able to go to Ueda Station on weekdays by using Kakeyu-Spa Line.) (Note: Transfer onto bus bound for Ueda at Kakeyu Onsen bus stop.)
- Track 8
  - For Kamikōchi
  - Shirahone-Onsen Line
- Track 9
  - For Nagano Station
  - For Matsumoto Airport
- Track 10
  - For Takayama
  - For Shinhotaka Ropeway
  - For Hakuba Happo
- Track 11
  - For Keisei Ueno Station, Asakusa, Nishi-Funabashi, Narita International Airport

== Companies ==
- Alpico Kotsu
- Kawanakajima Bus
- Keio Bus
- Meitetsu Bus
- Hankyu Bus
- Nohi Bus
