= Chuo Highway Bus =

Chuo Highway Bus may refer to:

- Chūō Kōsoku Bus (中央高速バス) of Keio Bus
- Chūō-dō Kōsoku Bus (中央道高速バス) of Meitetsu Bus
- Chūō Liner (bus) (中央ライナー) of JR Bus
