= Alpico Kōtsū =

Transport company in Chūbu region, Japan

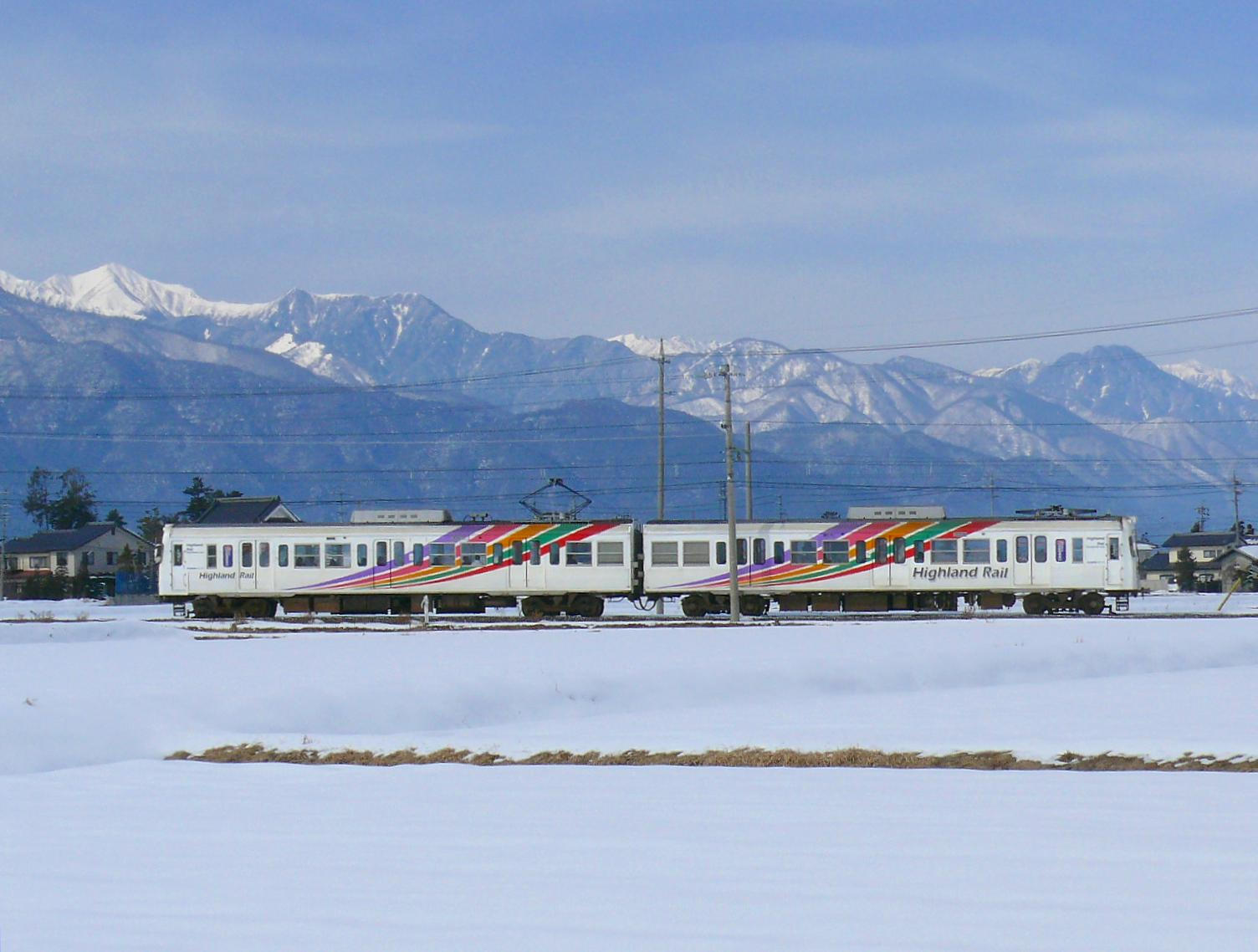
The train on the Kamikōchi Line runs as it commands a view of the mountain range in the Northern Japanese Alps. (Photo taken in 2008)

Alpico Kōtsū Co., Ltd. (アルピコ交通株式会社, Arupiko Kōtsū Kabushiki-gaisha) is a public transport company in Nagano Prefecture, Japan. It is the core company of Alpico Group and is wholly owned by Alpico Holdings Co., Ltd. The company was known as Matsumoto Electric Railway Co., Ltd. (松本電気鉄道株式会社, Matsumoto Denki-tetsudō Kabushiki-gaisha) until its merger with two affiliate companies on April 1, 2011.

== Headquarters ==
The company's headquarters are at 1-1 Igawajō 2-chōme, Matsumoto, Nagano Prefecture 390-8518 Japan.

== Area served ==
The company serves the cities of Chino, Matsumoto, Nagano, Okaya, Suwa, and their vicinities.

== History ==
- May 29, 1920 - Incorporated as Chikuma Railway (筑摩鉄道)
- October 2, 1921 - Opens Shimashima Line railway between Matsumoto and Niimura.
- May 3, 1922 - Extends Shimashima Line from Niimura to Hata.
- September 26, 1922 - Extends Shimashima Line from Hata to Shimashima.
- October 31, 1922 - Renamed as Chikuma Electric Railway (筑摩電気鉄道)
- April 19, 1924 - Opens Asama Line tramway between Matsumoto and Asama-onsen.
- December 2, 1932 - Renamed as Matsumoto Electric Railway
- 1942 - Merges with Matsumoto Jidōsha (松本自動車) bus company.
- 1955 - Renames Shimashima Line as Kamikōchi Line.
- April 1, 1964 - Abolishes Asama Line.
- September 28, 1983 - As a result of typhoon disaster, suspends a section of Kamikōchi Line between Shin-Shimashima and Shimashima.
- December 31, 1984 - Officially abolishes the suspended section of Kamikōchi Line.
- April 1, 2011 - Merges with Kawanakajima Bus and Suwa Bus and renamed as Alpico Kōtsū.

== Railway operation ==
The company operates the Kamikōchi Line railway, which serves the Kamikōchi tourism area in conjunction with bus service.

The Asama Line, closed in 1964, was a tramway that connected the city of Matsumoto with Asama Onsen hot spa resort.

== Bus operation ==
The company operates highway bus routes and commuter bus routes.

=== Highway bus routes ===
- Chuo Kosoku Bus
  - Matsumoto Bus Terminal - Shinjuku: servicing it in collaboration with Keio Bus
  - Hakuba - Shinjuku: servicing it in collaboration with Keio Bus
- Chuo-do Kosoku Bus
  - Matsumoto Bus Terminal - Nagoya
  - servicing it in collaboration with Meitetsu Bus
- Matsumoto Bus Terminal - Chubu Centrair International Airport
- Alpine Matsumoto Go
  - Matsumoto Bus Terminal - Osaka
  - servicing it in collaboration with Hankyu Bus
- Misuzu Highway Bus
  - Nagano - Matsumoto Bus Terminal
  - Matsumoto Bus Terminal - Iida

== See also ==
- Kawanakajima Bus
- Suwa Bus
