= Suwa Bus =

Japanese bus company

Suwa Bus Co., Ltd.
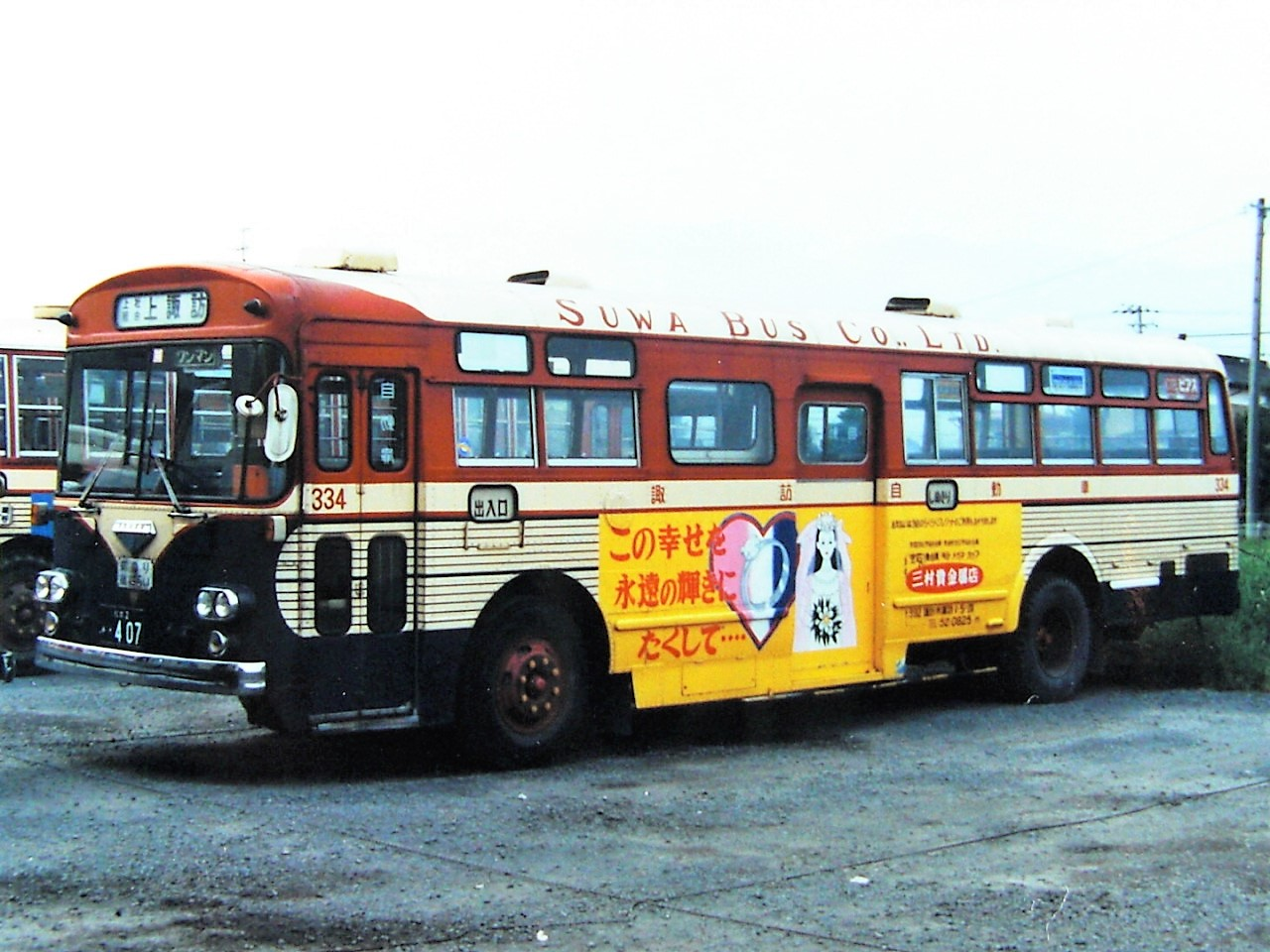
- Suwa Bus
- Parent: Alpico Kotsu
- Founded: 3 July 1919
- Service area: Nagano
- Service type: Bus
- Website: Suwa Bus(in Japanese)

Suwa Bus (諏訪バス) had been a bus company in Suwa area Nagano Prefecture, Japan until March 2011 because the company has been be taken over by Alpico Kotsu. After merging to Alpico Kotsu, Suwa Bus is a nickname which Alpico Kotsu Group operates on Suwa area.

== History ==
- July 3, 1919 - Incorporation of Suwa Jidōsha K.K.
- July 1941 - Setting of greater Suwa area as business area
- December 1963 - Acquisition by Matsumoto Electric Railway as a subsidiary
- May 1981 - Change of corporate name to Suwa Bus K.K.
- December 1984 - Opening of Chuo Kosoku Bus Iida route (Iida–Shinjuku)
- November 1986 - Opening of Chūō Expressway Bus Chino Route (Chūō Expressway Chino Bus Stop–Shinjuku)
- July 1987 - Opening of Chūō Expressway Bus Suwa–Okaya Route (Kami-Suwa/Okaya–Shinjuku)
- September 1988 - Opening of Misuzu Highway Bus
- July 1989 - Opening of Chino–Nagoya route via Chūō Expressway (discontinued in April 1997)
- December 1989 - Opening of Chino–Osaka route via Chūō Expressway
- March 1993 - Opening of Fujimi/Chino–Nagano route via Nagano Expressway (discontinued in 1996)
- August 1999 - Opening of Chino city welfare bus
- September 1999 - Opening of "Karinchan Bus" circulation route in Suwa
- July 2000 - Opening of Okaya citizens bus "Silky Bus"
- July 2004 - Opening of "Swan Bus" Lake Suwa circulation route in Okaya

== Lines ==
=== Highway Lines ===
- Okaya, Suwa⇔Shinjuku (Chuo Kosoku Bus Suwa/Okaya Line: collaboration with Keio Bus, Fuji Express, Yamanashi Kotsu, JR Bus Kanto)
- Iida⇔Shinjuku (Chuo Kosoku Bus Iida Line: collaboration with Keio Bus, Ina Bus, Shin'nan Kotsu)
- Chino, Suwa, Okaya⇔Osaka (Alpine Suwa Go: collaboration with Hankyu Bus)
  - Chino BT, Kamisuwa Station, Shimosuwa, Osachi, Okaya City Office, Imai, Chuo. Exp Tatsuno⇔Kyoto-Fukakusa, Meishin-Oyamazaki, Takatsuki BS, Ibaraki BS, Senri New Town, Shin-Osaka, Osaka (Umeda)

== See also ==
- Matsumoto Electric Railway
- Kawanakajima Bus
