= Smart Roadway Transit =

Bus transit system in Nagoya, Aichi Prefecture, Japan

Overview
- Status: In operation
- Began service: 13 February 2026

Route
- Start: Sakae
- Via: Nagoya Station
- End: Sakae
- Length: 5.6 km
- Stops: 7

Smart Roadway Transit, or SRT is a bus line in Nagoya, Japan. The line is planned to start operating on 13 February 2026, running four days a week with 12 trips a day.

== History ==
The opening ceremony was held on 11 February 2026. The line will start operating on 13 February. Additional buses is planned to enter service when the new route connecting Nagoya Station with Nagoya Castle opens.

== Operations ==
The line will be operated by Meitetsu Bus, and will operate from Friday to Monday with 12 trips a day. The line will use articulated buses that has a capacity of 122 people. The line will have seven stops, three of which are currently under construction.
