= Keio Dentetsu Bus =

Japanese bus company

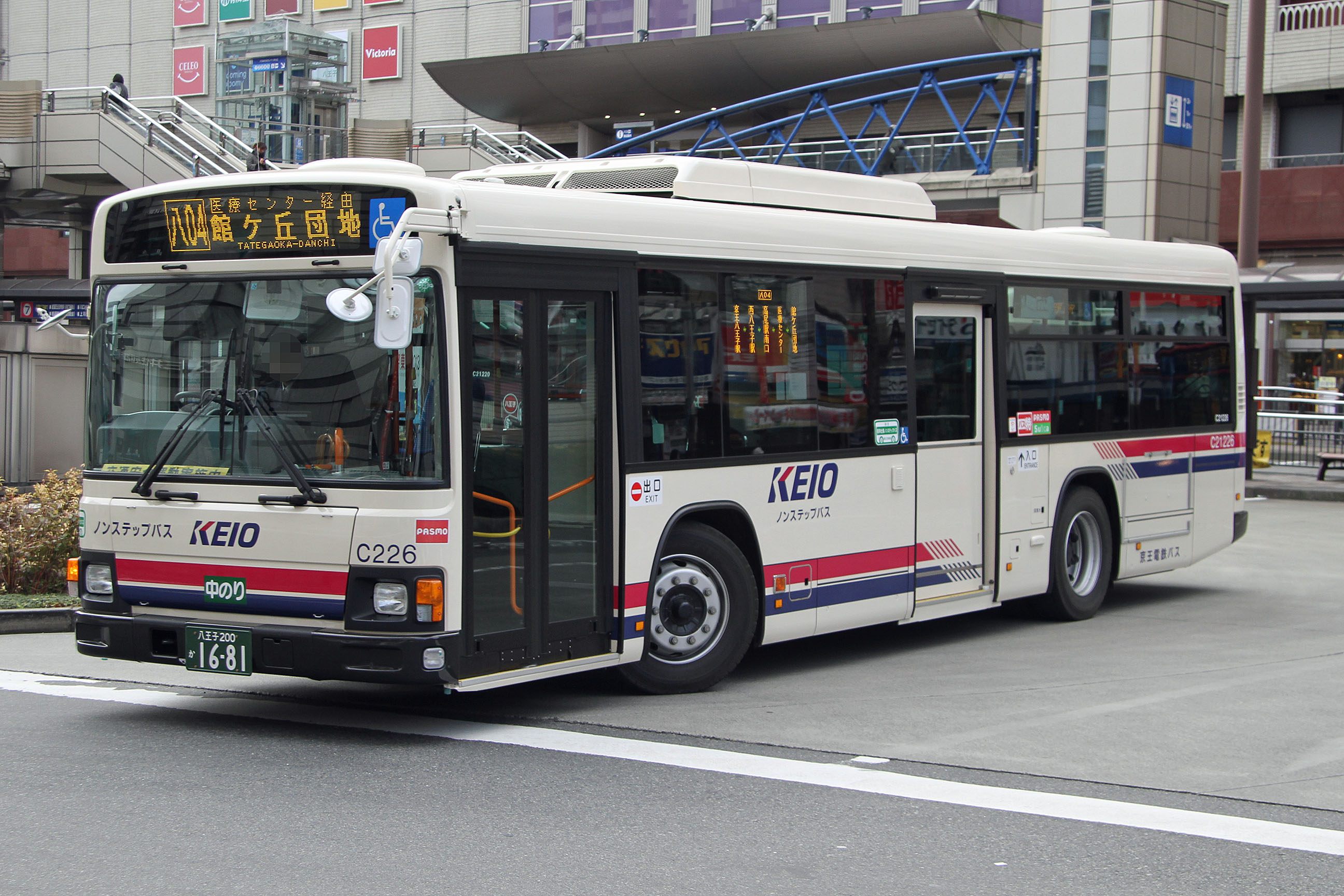
- A Keio Dentetsu Bus car in Hachioji
- Founded: 2002
- Headquarters: Fuchū, Tokyo, Japan
- Service area: Tokyo along Keio Line
- Service type: Bus
- Stations: 10 depots, 2 branch offices
- Fleet: 858 buses (as of July 2007)
- Fuel type: Diesel fuel, Compressed natural gas
- Operator: Keio Dentetsu Bus Co., Ltd. Keio Bus Higashi Co., Ltd. Keio Bus Chūō Co., Ltd. Keio Bus Minami Co., Ltd. Keio Bus Koganei Co., Ltd.
- Website: http://www.keio-bus.com

Keio Dentetsu Bus Co., Ltd. (京王電鉄バス株式会社, Keiō Dentetsu Basu Kabushiki-gaisha) is a core bus-operating company of the Keio Group which was established on February 1, 2002, inherited business all of the Keio Electric Railway (present Keio Corporation) automobile operation division and started business on August 1 of the same year. It has four subsidiaries, Keio Bus Higashi Co., Ltd. (京王バス東株式会社, Keiō Basu Higashi Kabushiki-gaisha), Keio Bus Chuo Co., Ltd. (京王バス中央株式会社, Keiō Basu Chūō Kabusiki-gaisha), Keio Bus Minami Co., Ltd. (京王バス南株式会社, Keiō Basu Minami Kabushiki-gaisha) and Keio Bus Koganei Co., Ltd. (京王バス小金井株式会社, Keiō Basu Koganei Kabushiki-gaisha) (This article also deals with these subsidiaries). The head office of these companies is located in Fuchu, Tokyo, Japan. The operating area of a general bus on a regular route is mainly the Tokyo Tama area and if the management commission route to each subsidiary company is included, the operating area is reached mostly whole region along all areas along the Keio railroad lines. Moreover, it operates around the expressway bus routes to Nagano Prefecture, Hida-Takayama, Miyagi Prefecture, etc. from Shinjuku.

== History ==
The history of the bus of Keio starts for the Keio Denki Kidō Co. to have opened the bus on April 15, 1913 in the section where the railroad is not opened for traffic (between Shinjuku Station - Sasazuka Station and between Chōfu Station - Fuchū Station - Kokubunji Station). Although these were the first bus business in Tokyo, the tone of the provisional means of transport was deep, and canceled between Chōfu Station - Kokubunji Station in 1914, between Shinjuku Station - Sasazuka Station was abolished with railroad commencement of business in 1915, and all have taken down the curtain for a short period of time.

Keio sets about a bus enterprise in early stages of Shōwa period again. Banzai Jidōsha Co.(万歳自動車) which operated around the bus from the end of Taishō period changed the company name to the Kōshū Kaidō Noriai Jidōsha Co.(甲州街道乗合自動車) in July, 1924, and the route was extended to Tama-mura Tokyo city-owned park cemetery (present Tama Cemetery) through Karasuyama and Chofu. However, Keio which has a railroad in parallel to the Kōshū Kaidō felt this as the threat, and made more than the majority of the holdings of the company acquisition and an associated company in May, 1927. Furthermore, the Keio acquired Kōshū Kaidō Noriai Jidōsha in 1937, and absorbed enterprise all. Thereby, the automobile division and Sasazuka office were installed and the bus enterprise of the direct management which leads to the present Keio Dentetsu Bus Group was resumed. Hachiōji Shigai Jidōsha Co.(八王子市街自動車) was purchased and the Hachioji Office was established in 1938. Moreover, Takahata Noriai (高幡乗合) is purchased in the same year, Yugi Noriai Jidōsha (由木乗合自動車) was purchased in 1939, and these enterprises were absorbed. The Pacific War broke out and the route within Yamanote Line was transferred to Tokyo City on February 1, 1942 for the war integration based on a land transport business method of preparation. Moreover, the Keio came to be merged by Tokyu Corporation on May 31, 1944 (Keio Teito Electric Railway dissociated from Tokyu in 1948).

== Depots ==
Head Office of Keio Dentetsu Bus and its subsidiaries - 2-22, Harumichō, Fuchu, Tokyo, Japan

- Keio Dentetsu Bus
  - Hachioji Depot (八王子営業所) - 1304-3, Naganumamachi, Hachioji, Tokyo, Japan
  - Sakuragaoka Depot (桜ヶ丘営業所) - 4-898, Ochikawa, Hino, Tokyo, Japan.
- Keio Bus Higashi
  - Nakano Depot (中野営業所) - 51-9, Yayoichō 2-chōme, Nakano, Tokyo, Japan
  - Eifukucho Depot (永福町営業所) - 60-19, Eifuku 2-chōme, Suginami, Tokyo, Japan
  - Chofu Depot (調布営業所) - 6-6, Kokuryōchō, Chofu, Tokyo, Japan
  - Setagaya Depot (世田谷営業所) - 9-1, Kami-Kitazawa, 5-chōme, Setagaya, Tokyo, Japan
- Keio Bus Chuo
  - Fuchu Depot (府中営業所) - 22, Harumichō 2-chōme, Fuchu, Tokyo, Japan
- Keio Bus Minami
  - Minami-Osawa Depot (南大沢営業所) - 26-1, Minami-Ōsawa 5-chōme, Hachioji, Tokyo, Japan
  - Tama Depot (多摩営業所) - 1-1, Minamino 1-chōme, Tama, Tokyo, Japan
  - Terada Branch Office (寺田支所) - 374-1, Teradamachi, Hachiōji, Tokyo, Japan
- Keio Bus Koganei
  - Koganei Depot (小金井営業所) - 3-31, Honchō 5-chōme, Koganei, Tokyo, Japan

== Major routes ==
=== Expressway bus routes ===
Route name	Japanese	Terminals		via	Co-operator(s)	History	Notes
Shinjuku - Fuji Five Lakes Line	新宿 - 富士五湖線	Shinjuku Highway Bus Terminal	Lake Motosuko	Fuji-Q Highland, Yamanakako Terminal	Fuji Kyuko		
Shinjuku - Fujisan Gogōme Line	新宿 - 富士山五合目線	Shinjuku Highway Bus Terminal	Mount Fuji 5-gome	Mount Fuji 3-gome	Fuji Kyuko		
Shinjuku - Kōfu Line	新宿 - 甲府線	Shinjuku Highway Bus Terminal	Kōfu Yumura Onsen	Kōfu Station	Fuji Kyuko, Yamanashi Kotsu		
Shinjuku - Suwa - Okaya Line	新宿 - 諏訪・岡谷線	Shinjuku Highway Bus Terminal	Okaya Station	Kami-Suwa Station	Fuji Kyuko, JR Bus Kanto, Yamanashi Kotsu, Suwa Bus		
Shinjuku - Matsumoto Line	新宿 - 松本線	Shinjuku Highway Bus Terminal	Matsumoto Bus Terminal	Matsumoto I.C.	Matsumoto Electric Railway		
Shinjuku - Nagano Line	新宿 - 長野線	Shinjuku Highway Bus Terminal	Zenkō-ji Daimon	Nagano Station	Kawanakajima Bus	Started in 1992, changed to current route in 1997.	
Shinjuku - Ina Line	新宿 - 伊那線	Shinjuku Highway Bus Terminal	Ina Bus Komagane Shed	Ina, Komagane	Fuji Kyuko, Yamanashi Kotsu, Ina Bus, Shinnan Kotsu		
Shinjuku - Iida Line	新宿 - 飯田線	Shinjuku Highway Bus Terminal	Iida, Hirugami Onsen	Komagane I.C.	Suwa Bus, Ina Bus, Shinnan Kotsu		
Shinjuku - Hakuba Line	新宿 - 白馬線	Shinjuku Highway Bus Terminal	Hakuba Happō	Shinano-Ōmachi Station	Matsumoto Electric Railway		
Shinjuku - Hida-Takayama Line	新宿 - 飛騨高山線	Shinjuku Highway Bus Terminal	Takayama Nōhi Bus Center	Hirayu Onsen	Nōhi Noriai Jidōsha		
Shinjuku - Nagoya Line	新宿 - 名古屋線	Shinjuku Highway Bus Terminal	Meitetsu Bus Center		Meitetsu Bus		
Shinjuku - Kiso-Fukushima Line	新宿 - 木曽福島線	Shinjuku Highway Bus Terminal	Kiso-Fukushima Station		Ontake Kotsu		
Shinjuku - Osaka Line	新宿 - 大阪（阪急梅田）線	Shibuya Mark City, Shinjuku Highway Bus Terminal	Umeda Station		Hankyu Bus		
Shinjuku - Kobe - Himeji Line ("Princess Road")	新宿 - 神戸 - 姫路線	Shibuya Mark City, Shinjuku Highway Bus Terminal	Himeji Station	Sannomiya Bus Terminal	Shinki Bus	Started on March 3, 1989 as Shibuya-Himeji Line "Milky Way" and in December 2003 as Shinjuku-Himeji Line. Two routes merged on March 22, 2007.	
Shinjuku - Minobu Line	新宿 - 身延線	Shinjuku Highway Bus Terminal	Minobu	Minami-Alps City Hall	Yamanashi Kotsu		
Shinjuku - Numazu Line	新宿 - 沼津線	Shinjuku Highway Bus Terminal	Fujikyu Numazu Office	Numazu Station North	Fujikyu City Bus		
Shinjuku - Hamamatsu Line	新宿 - 浜松線	Shinjuku Highway Bus Terminal, Shibuya Mark City	Hamamatsu Station	Hamamatsu I.C.	JR Tokai Bus	Started on Dec 15, 2006	
Shinjuku - Shizuoka Line	新宿 - 静岡線	Shinjuku Highway Bus Terminal, Shibuya Mark City	Higashi-Shizuoka Station	Shizuoka Station			
"Hirose Liner"	広瀬ライナー号	Shinjuku Highway Bus Terminal, Shibuya Mark City	Ishinomaki Station	Sendai Station	Miyagi Transportation	Started on Mar. 31, 2006	
Narita - Chofu Line	成田 - 調布線	Narita Airport	Chōfu Station		Airport Transport Service		
Narita - Tama-Center Line	成田 - 多摩センター線	Narita Airport	Minami-Ōsawa Station	Seiseki-Sakuragaoka Station, Tama-Center Station	Airport Transport Service		
Haneda - Tama-Center Line	羽田 - 多摩センター線	Haneda Airport	Minami-Ōsawa Station	Tama-Center Station	Airport Transport Service		
Haneda - Chofu Line	羽田 - 調布線	Haneda Airport	Chōfu Station		Airport Transport Service		
Haneda - Kokubunji Line	羽田 - 国分寺線	Haneda Airport	Kokubunji Station		Airport Transport Service		
Haneda - Hachioji Line	羽田 - 八王子線	Haneda Airport	Hachiōji Station, Takao Station		Airport Transport Service, Tama Bus		

=== Regular routes ===
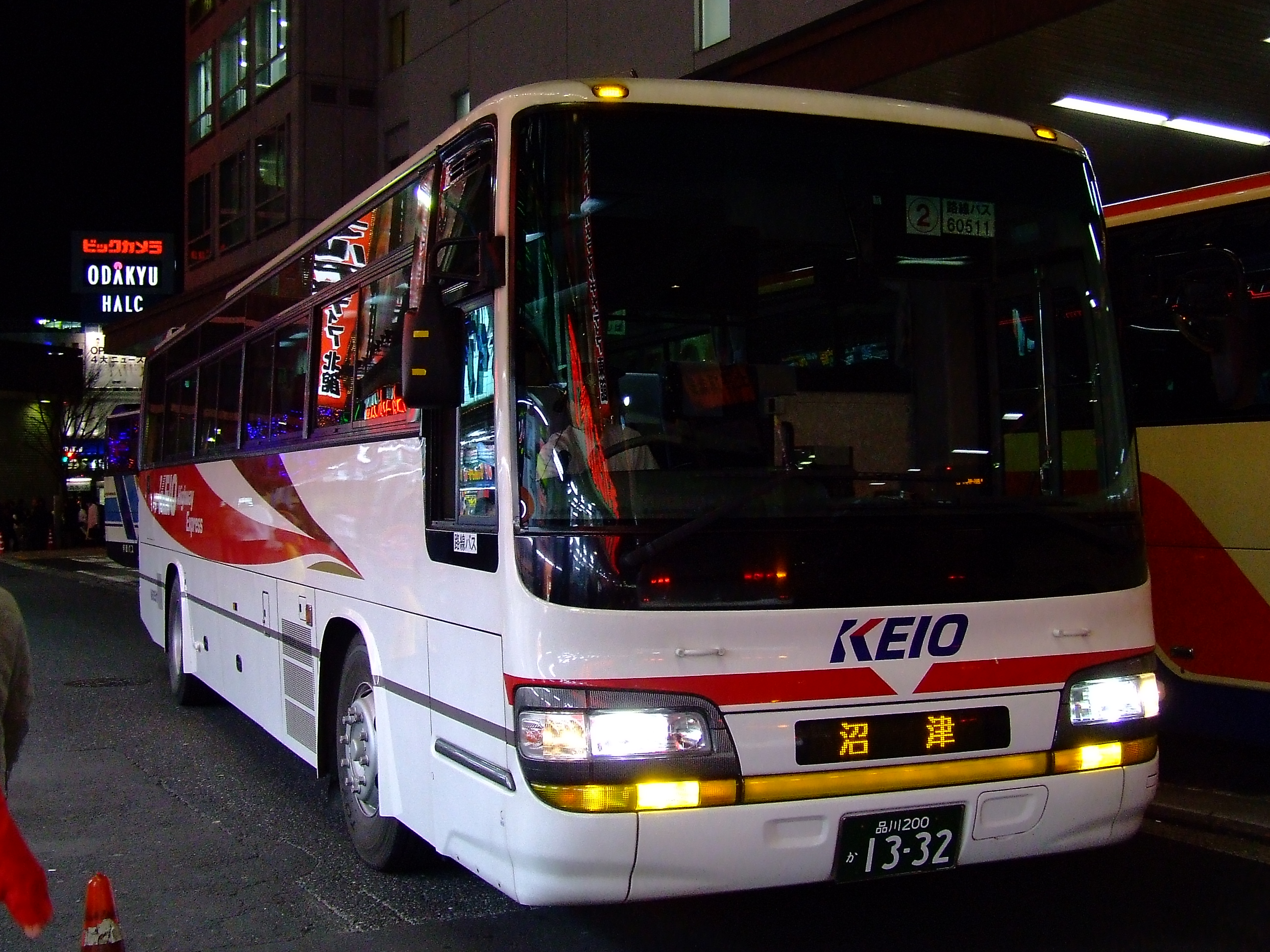
A Keio Dentetsu Bus highway bus

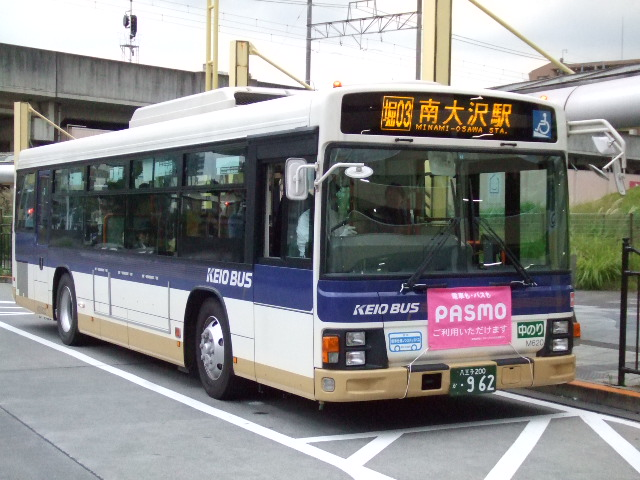
A Keio Bus Minami vehicle

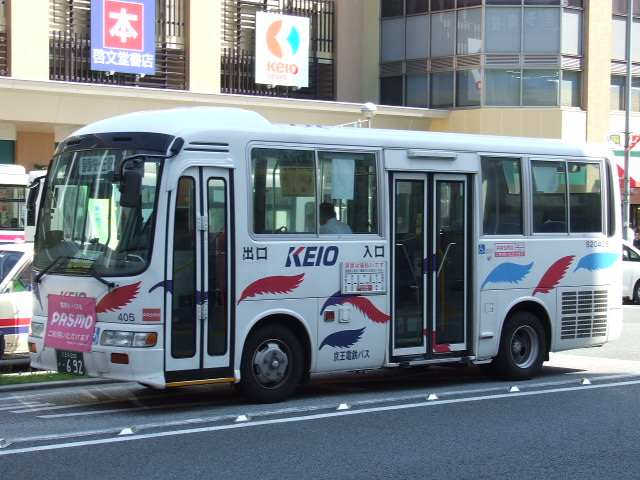
A minibus operated in Tama area

Operators:

^{D} : Keio Dentetsu Bus
^{H} : Keio Bus Higashi
^{C} : Keio Bus Chuo
^{M} : Keio Bus Minami
^{K} : Keio Bus Koganei

- From Shibuya Station
  - for Hatsudai Station via Tomigaya (富ヶ谷) and Tokyo Opera City ^{H}
  - for Sasazuka Station via Tomigaya ^{H}
  - for Asagaya Station via Hōnanchō (方南町) and Shin-Kōenji Station ^{H}
- From Shinjuku Station
  - for Nakano Station via Rokugō-Dōri (六号通り) ^{H}
  - for Eifukuchō (永福町) via Hōnanchō ^{H}
- From Nakano Station
  - for Eifukuchō via Hōnanchō ^{H}
  - Daitabashi Circulate Line (代田橋循環線) ^{H}
- From Kōenji Station
  - for Eifukuchō via Shin-Kōenji Station ^{H}
- From Chōfu Station North Exit
  - for Kichijōji Station via Chūō Expressway Jindaiji B.S. (中央道深大寺バス停下) ^{H}
  - for Kyorin University Hospital (杏林大学病院) via Chūō Expressway Jindaiji B.S. ^{H}
- From Chōfu station South Exit
  - for Tsutsujigaoka Station via Matsubara (松原) ^{H}
  - for Kurumagaeshi-Danchi-Orikaeshijō (車返団地折返場) via Tamagawa-Dōri (多摩川通り) ^{H}
  - for Inagi Municipal Hospital (稲城市立病院) via Yanokuchi Station ^{H}
- From Fuchū Station
  - for Musashi-Koganei Station via Ippongi (一本木) and Gakuen-Dōri Post Office (学園通り郵便局) ^{D}
  - for Kokubunji Station via Meisei Gakuen (明星学苑) ^{D}
  - for Kunitachi Station via Fuchu Hospital (府中病院) ^{C}
  - for Inagi Municipal Hospital via Koremasa (是政) ^{C}
- From Seiseki-Sakuragaoka Station
  - for Tama-Center Station via Matsugaya (松が谷) ^{D}
  - for Minami-Ōsawa Station via Yugi-Orikaeshijō (由木折返場) ^{M}
  - for Takahatafudō Station via Mogusaen Station ^{D}
- From Takahatafudō Station
  - for Tachikawa Station via Hino Bridge (日野橋) ^{D}
  - for Teikyo University (帝京大学) ^{D}
- From Hino Station
  - for Toyoda Station via Izumizuka (泉塚) ^{D}
  - for Hachiōji Station via Hinodai (日野台) ^{D}
- From Toyoda Station
  - for Hachiōji Station via Ōwada-Sakaue (大和田坂上) ^{D}
  - for Tama-Center Station via Tama Tech (多摩テック) ^{D}
- From Hachiōji Station (Keio & JR) North Exit
  - for Nagafusa-Danchi (長房団地) and Shiroyamate (城山手) via Oiwake (追分) ^{D}
  - for Tategaoka-Danchi (館ヶ丘団地) via Nishi-Hachiōji Station ^{D}
- From Hachiōji Station (JR) South Exit
  - for Mejirodai Station via Fujimori Park (富士森公園) ^{D}
  - for Minami-Ōsawa Station via Kitano Station ^{M}
- From Minami-Ōsawa Station
  - Minami-Ōsawa 5-chome junkan (Circulate Line) (南大沢5丁目循環) ^{M}
  - for Tama Art University (多摩美術大学) ^{M}
- From Takao Station
  - for Tategaoka-Danchi ^{D}
  - for Kobotoke (小仏) ^{M}

=== Community bus routes ===
- Hachiko Bus (ハチ公バス, Hachikō Basu) in Shibuya in collaboration with Tokyu Transsés and Fuji Express.
- Shinjuku WE Bus (新宿WEバス, Shinjuku Wii Basu) in Shinjuku.
- Sugimaru (すぎ丸, Sugimaru) in Suginami City in collaboration with Kanto Bus.
- Chofu City Mini Bus (調布市ミニバス, chōfushi Mini Basu) in Chōfu, Tokyo in collaboration with Odakyu Bus.
- Bun Bus (ぶんバス, Bunbasu) in Kokubunji City in collaboration with Tachikawa Bus.
- CoCo Bus (CoCoバス, Kokobasu) in Koganei City.
- Chu Bus (ちゅうバス, Chūbasu) in Fuchu City.
- Hino City Mini Bus (日野市ミニバス, Hinoshi Mini Basu) in Hino City.
- Tama City Mini Bus (多摩市ミニバス, Tamashi Mini Basu) in Tama City.

== Vehicles ==
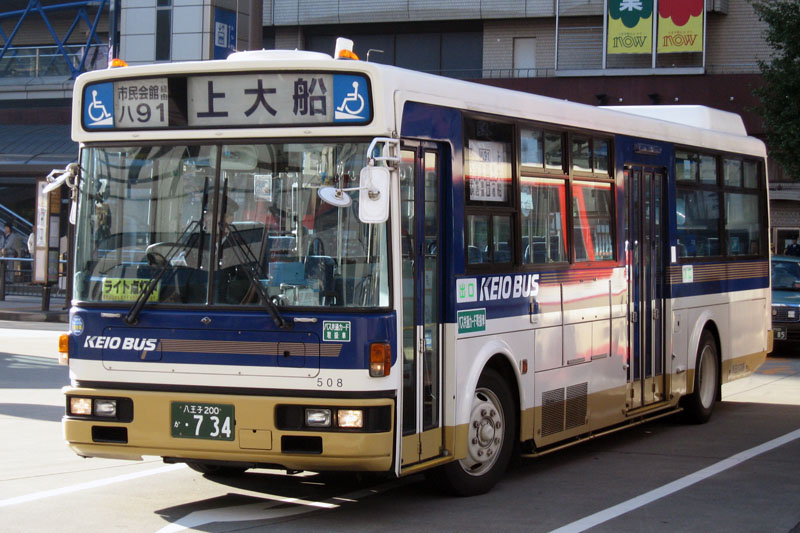
Nissan Diesel JP introduced in 1995

The vehicles introduced from four manufacturers, Hino, Isuzu, Mitsubishi Fuso and Nissan Diesel, are held into the Keio Dentetsu Bus Group. Although the general route vehicle is introduced from all these four manufacturers, the rate of the Nissan Diesel vehicles is slightly high. The reason is that the one-step vehicles with narrow width and long body (Nissan Diesel JP) were purchased in lump sum from Nissan Diesel in advancing low floor-ization of vehicles in the mid-1990s.

== See also ==
- List of bus operating companies in Japan (east)
- Keio Corporation
- Nishi Tokyo Bus
