= Ryūō Station =

Railway station in Kai, Yamanashi Prefecture, Japan

CO44 Ryūō Station 竜王駅
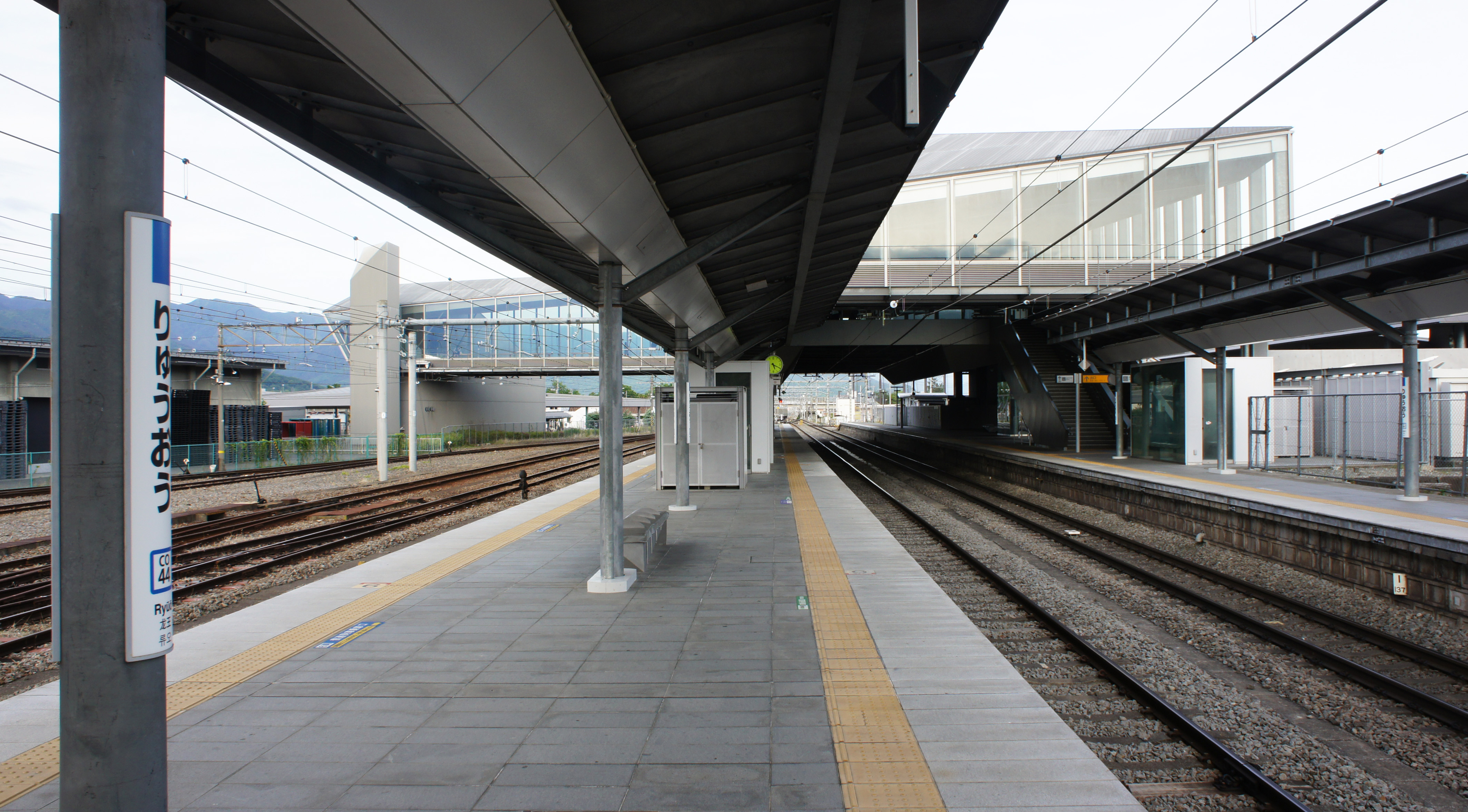
- Platforms and station building

General information
- Location: Mubanchi, Ryūōshinmachi, Kai-shi, Yamanashi-ken; Japan
- Coordinates: 35°40′08″N 138°31′11″E
- Operator: JR East; JR Freight
- Line: ■ Chūō Main Line
- Distance: 138.6 km from Tokyo
- Platforms: 1 side + 1 island platform
- Tracks: 3

Other information
- Status: Staffed (Midori no Madoguchi)
- Website: Official website

History
- Opened: December 15, 1903

Passengers
- FY2024: 4,916 (daily) ▲6.68%

Services
Preceding station	JR East	Following station
Terminus	Kaiji (limited service)	Kōfu CO43 towards Tokyo
Shiozaki CO45 towards Shiojiri	Chūō Main Line Local	Kōfu CO43 towards Tachikawa
Location
- Location within Yamanashi Prefecture Location within Japan

Ryūō Station (竜王駅, Ryūō-eki) is a railway station of Chūō Main Line, East Japan Railway Company (JR East) in Ryūō-shinmachi, in the city of Kai, Yamanashi Prefecture, Japan. The station is also a container terminal for the Japan Freight Railway Company (JR Freight).

== Lines ==
Ryūō Station is served by the Chūō Main Line, and is 138.6 kilometers from the terminus of the line at Tokyo Station.

== Layout ==
Ryūō Station has an elevated station building with one side platform and one island platform, serving three tracks. The station has a Midori no Madoguchi staffed ticket office.

=== Platforms ===
1, 2	■ Chūō Main Line	for Kobuchizawa, Shiojiri and Matsumoto
3	■ Chūō Main Line	for Kōfu, Ōtsuki, Hachiōji and Shinjuku

== History ==
Ryūō Station opened on December 15, 1903 as a station on the Japanese Government Railways (JGR). The JGR became the JNR (Japanese National Railways) after the end of World War II. With the dissolution and privatization of the JNR on April 1, 1987, the station came under the joint control of the East Japan Railway Company and the Japan Freight Railway Company. A container terminal was established on June 1, 1988. Automated turnstiles using the Suica IC Card system came into operation from October 16, 2004. A new station building was completed in March 2008.

== Passenger statistics ==
In fiscal 2017, the station was used by an average of 2,355 passengers daily (boarding passengers only).

== Gallery ==
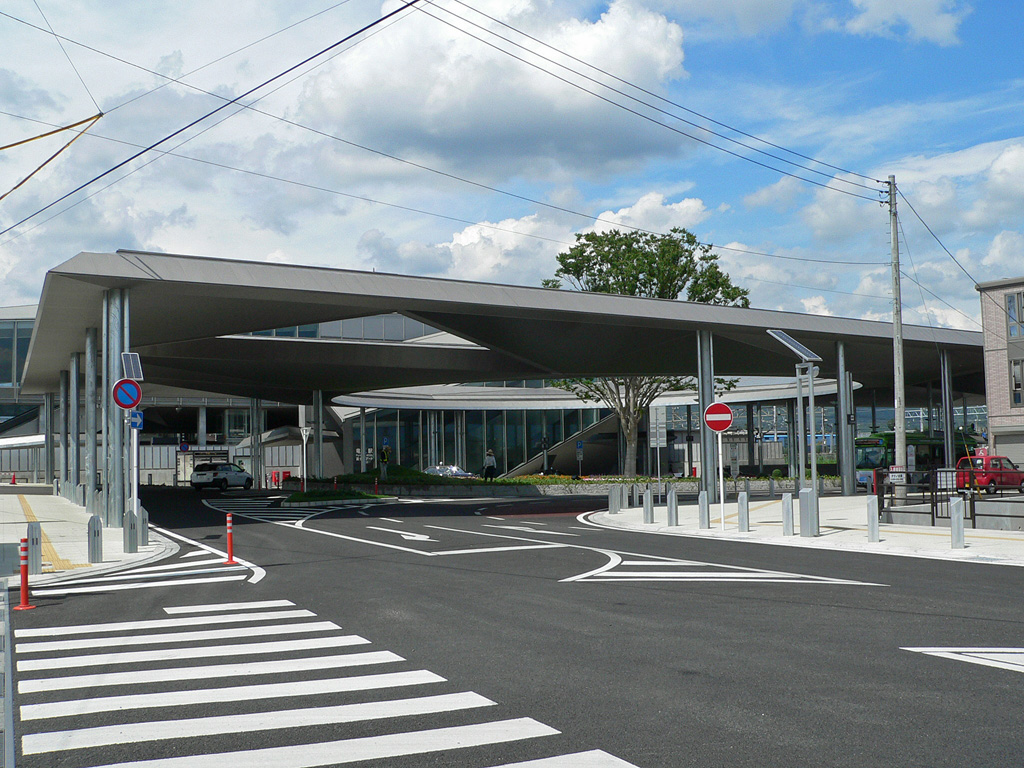
South entrance (a.k.a. Fujisan Gate)

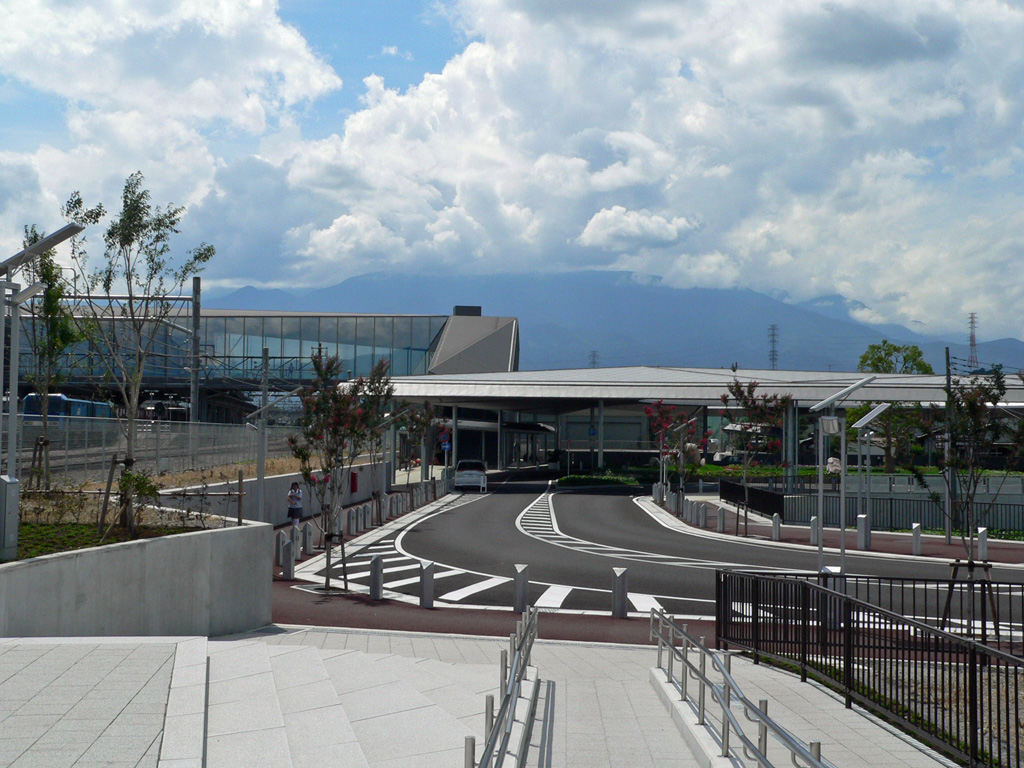
North entrance (a.k.a. Shōsen-kyō Gate)

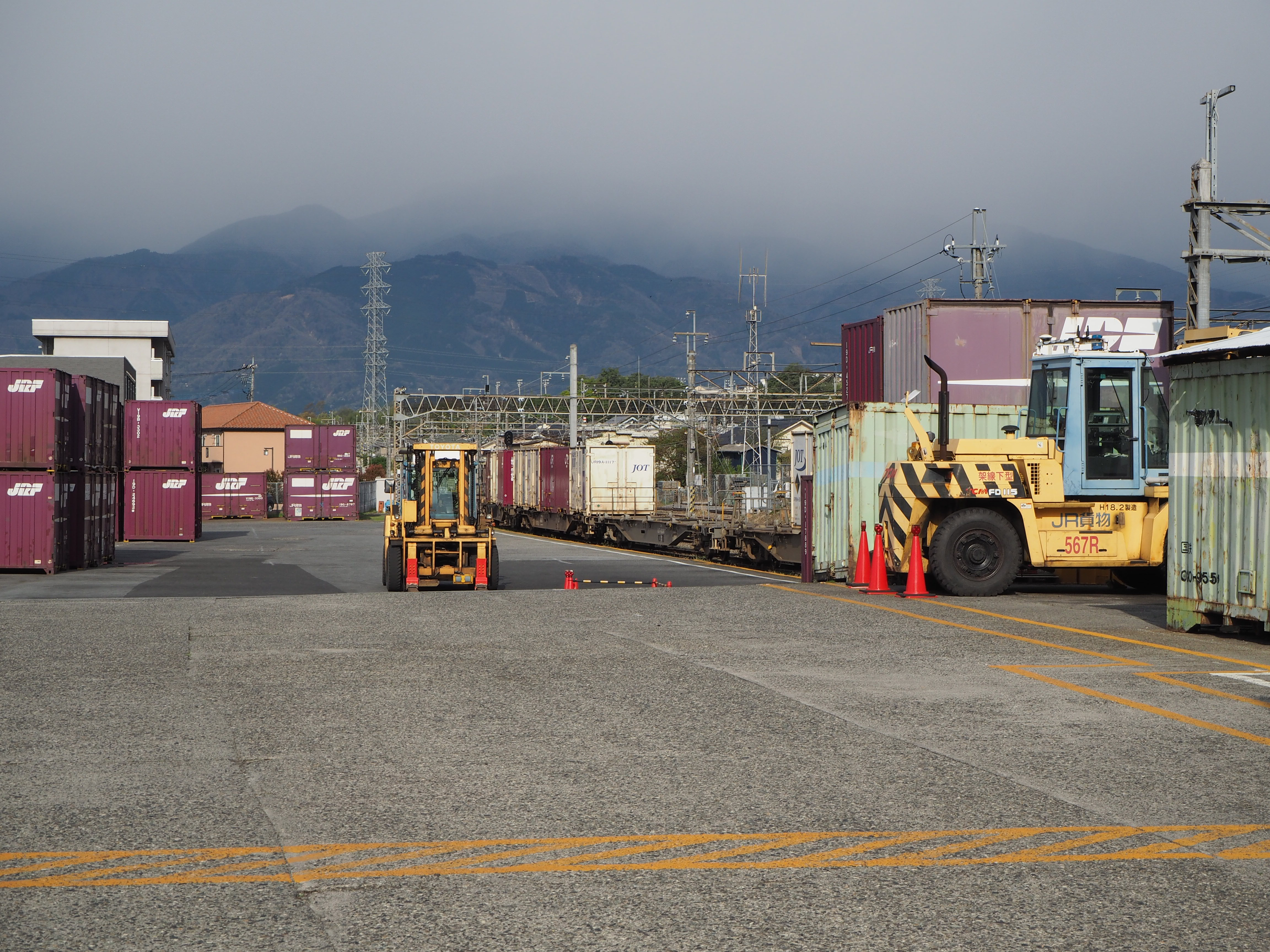
JR Freight container terminal

== Bus terminals ==
=== Highway Buses ===
Highway buses depart from the south exit.

- Chūō Kōsoku Bus; For Shinjuku Station (Yamanashi Kōtsū, Keio Bus East)
- Airport Limousine; For Haneda Airport (YamanashiKotsu, Keihin Kyuko Line)
- For Yokohama Station (Yamanashi Kotsu, Keihin Kyuko Bus)
- Airport Limousine; For Narita International Airport (Yamanashi Kotsu, Chiba Kotsu)
- For Minobu, Shin-Shizuoka Station, and Shizuoka Station (Yamanashi Kotsu, Shizutetsu Justline)
- Nagoya Liner Kofu; For Iida, Nakatsugawa, and Nagoya Station (Yamanashi Kotsu, JR Tokai Bus)
- Crystal Liner; For Kyōto Station, Ōsaka Station, Ōsaka Namba Station, and Universal Studios Japan (Yamanashi Kotsu, Kintetsu Bus)

== Surrounding area ==
- Ryūō post office
- Kōfu City Hall

== See also ==
- List of railway stations in Japan
