= Chūō Kōsoku Bus =

Highway bus route in Japan

Chūō Kōsoku Bus (中央高速バス, Chūō Kōsoku Basu) is a group of Japanese highway bus lines managed by Keio Bus. It connects Tokyo with the areas along the Chūō Expressway, especially Yamanashi Prefecture and Nagano Prefecture, in particular Fuji-San.

== Lines ==
=== Fuji-Goko Line ===
- Shinjuku - Uenohara - Tsuru - Fuji-Q Highaland - Kawaguchiko Sta. - Fujisan Sta. - Oshino - Yamanakako
- Shinjuku - Uenohara - Tsuru - Fuji-Q Highaland- Fujisan Sta. - Kawaguchiko Sta. - Motosuko

Companies：:Keio Bus, Fujikyu

- Shinjuku Kosoku Bus Terminal
- Chuo Exp. Mitaka
- Chuo Exp. Jindaiji
- Chuo Exp. Fuchu
- Chuo Exp. Hino
- Chuo Exp. Hachioji
- Chuo Exp. Sagamiko
- ||
- Chuo Exp. Uenohara
- ||
- Chuo Exp. Notajiri
- Chuo Exp. Saruhashi
- Chuo Exp. Ogatayama
- Chuo Exp. Tsuru
- Chuo Exp. Shimoyoshida
- Fuji-Q Highland
- Kawaguchiko Station
- Fujisan Station
- Oshino Iriguchi
- Hotel Mt. Fuji Iriguchi
- Yamanaka-Kyoku Iriguchi
- Yamanakako Village Office
- Yamanakako Asahigaoka
- Bugakusou
- Yamanakako Hirano

=== Tama - Kawaguchiko Line ===
- Minami-Osawa Sta.
- Tama-Center Sta.
- Seiseki-Sakuragaoka Sta.
- ||
- Chuo Exp. Uenohara
- Chuo Exp. Notajiri
- Chuo Exp. Saruhashi
- Chuo Exp. Ogatayama
- Chuo Exp. Tsuru
- Chuo Exp. Shimoyoshida
- Fuji-Q Highland
- Fujisan Station
- Kawaguchiko Station

=== The 5th uphill of Mt. Fuji Line ===
- Shinjuku Kosoku Bus Terminal
- Chuo Exp. Mitaka
- Chuo Exp. Jindaiji
- Chuo Exp. Fuchu
- Chuo Exp. Hino
- Chuo Exp. Hachioji
- Chuo Exp. Sagamiko
- Chuo Exp. Uenohara
- ||
- Mt. Fuji 3rd
- Mt. Fuji 5th

=== Kofu Line ===
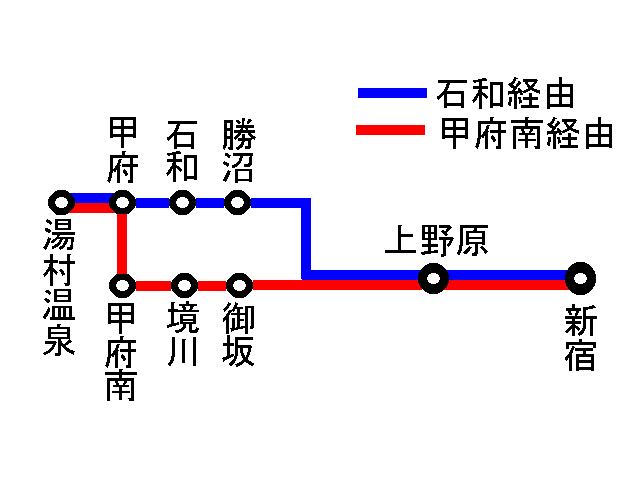
the route map of Kofu Line

- Shinjuku Highway Bus Terminal (新宿) - Chuo Exp. Uenohara (上野原) - Kōfu Station (甲府), Yumura-Onsen (湯村温泉)

Companies：:Keio Bus, Fujikyu, Yamanashi Kotsu

==== Via Isawa ====
- Shinjuku Kosoku Bus Terminal
- Chuo Exp. Mitaka
- Chuo Exp. Jindaiji
- Chuo Exp. Fuchu
- Chuo Exp. Hino
- Chuo Exp. Hachioji
- Chuo Exp. Sagamiko
- ||
- Chuo Exp. Uenohara
- ||
- Chuo Exp. Notajiri
- Chuo Exp. Saruhashi
- Chuo Exp. Magi
- Chuo Exp. Sasago
- Chuo Exp. Kai-Yamato
- Katsunuma
- Ichinomiya
- Isawa
- Yamanashi Gakuin Univ.
- Zenkoji
- Chuo 3-chome
- Kofu Station

==== Via Kofu-minami ====
- Shinjuku Kosoku Bus Terminal
- Chuo Exp. Mitaka
- Chuo Exp. Jindaiji
- Chuo Exp. Fuchu
- Chuo Exp. Hino
- Chuo Exp. Hachioji
- Chuo Exp. Sagamiko
- ||
- Chuo Exp. Uenohara
- ||
- Chuo Exp. Nodajiri
- Chuo Exp. Saruhashi
- Chuo Exp. Magi
- Chuo Exp. Sasago
- Chuo Exp. Kai-Yamato
- Chuo Exp. Shakado
- Chuo Exp. Kai-Ichinomiya
- Chuo Exp. Misaka
- Chuo Exp. Yatsushiro
- Chuo Exp. Sakaigawa
- Chuo Exp. Kofu-Minami (Down only)
- Nakamichi
- Minami-Kofu Police Office
- Ise 1-chome
- Kofu Station

=== Koshu-Enzan Line (Koshu-Wine Liner) ===
- Shinjuku Highway Bus Terminal
- ||
- Budou Bridge
- Katsunuma Town Office
- Budou no Oka
- Koshu Citty Office
- Erin-ji
- Chidoriko
- Yamanashi Cith Office
- Kofu Kamiahara

=== Minami-ALPS City / Minobu Line ===
- Shinjuku Kosoku Bus Terminal
- Chuo Exp. Mitaka
- Chuo Exp. Jindaiji
- Chuo Exp. Fuchu
- Chuo Exp. Hino
- Chuo Exp. Hachioji
- ||
- Nishi-Yahatata
- Kami-Imasuwa
- Shirane IC West
- Momozono
- Minami-Alps City Office
- Furuichiba
- Aoyagi
- Kajikazawa-Honcho
- Nishijima
- Kiriishi
- Iitomi
- Umedaira
- Minobusan
- Minobu

=== Chuo City / Minami-Alps City Line (Minami-Alps Eco Park Liner) ===
- Shinjuku Kosoku Bus Terminal
- Chuo Exp. Mitaka
- Chuo Exp. Jindaiji
- Chuo Exp. Fuchu
- Chuo Exp. Hino
- Chuo Exp. Hachioji
- ||
- Otsu Machi
- Yamanashi Univ. Hospital Iriguchi
- Tatomi
- Minami-Alps I.C. Iriguchi
- Minami-Alps Firehouse
- Iino-Kamishuku
- Mujina
- Hatta

=== Suwa / Okaya Line ===
==== Via Suwa IC ====
- Shinjuku Kosoku Bus Terminal
- Chuo Exp. Mitaka
- Chuo Exp. Jindaiji
- Chuo Exp. Fuchu
- Chuo Exp. Hino
- Chuo Exp. Hachioji
- ||
- Chuo Exp. Showa
- Chuo Exp. Futaba-Higashi
- Chuo Exp. Nirasaki
- Chuo Exp. Akeno
- Chuo Exp. Sutama
- Chuo Exp. Nagasaka-Takane
- Chuo Exp. Yatsugatake
- Chuo Exp. Kobuchizawa
- Chuo Exp. Fujimi
- Chuo Exp. Hara
- Chuo Exp. Chino
- Suwa IC Mae
- Kami-Suwa Station
- Shimosuwa
- Osachi
- Okaya City Office
- Okaya Station

==== Via Okaya IC ====
- Shinjuku Kosoku Bus Terminal
- Chuo Exp. Mitaka
- Chuo Exp. Jindaiji
- Chuo Exp. Fuchu
- Chuo Exp. Hino
- Chuo Exp. Hachioji
- ||
- Chuo Exp. Showa
- Chuo Exp. Futaba-Higashi
- Chuo Exp. Nirasaki
- Chuo Exp. Akeno
- Chuo Exp. Sutama
- Chuo Exp. Nagasaka-Takane
- Chuo Exp. Yatsugatake
- Chuo Exp. Kobuchizawa
- Chuo Exp. Fujimi
- Chuo Exp. Hara
- Chuo Exp. Chino
- Chuo Exp. Aruga
- Imai
- Okaya City Office
- Okaya Station
- Osachi
- Shimosuwa
- Kami-Suwa Station

=== Ina Line ===
- Shinjuku Highway Bus Terminal
- Chuo Exp. Mitaka
- Chuo Exp. Jindaiji
- Chuo Exp. Fuchu
- Chuo Exp. Hino
- Chuo Exp. Hachioji
- ||
- Chuo Exp. Kawagishi
- Chuo Exp. Tatsuno
- Chuo Exp. Minowa
- Ina I.C. Mae
- Inashi
- Sawando
- Miyada
- Komagane-Shi
- Ina-Bus Komagane Garrage

=== Iida Line ===
- Shinjuku Highway Bus Terminal
- Chuo Exp. Mitaka
- Chuo Exp. Jindaiji
- Chuo Exp. Fuchu
- Chuo Exp. Hino
- Chuo Exp. Hachioji
- ||
- Chuo Exp. Kawagishi
- Chuo Exp. Tatsuno
- Chuo Exp. Minowa
- Chuo Exp. Ina I.C.
- Chuo Exp. Nishi-Haruchika
- Chuo Exp. Miyada
- Chuo Exp. Komagane I.C.
- Iijima
- Matsukawa
- Takamori
- Kami-Iida
- Igara
- Iida Sta.
- Iida Chamber of Commerce and Industry

=== Tachikawa - Iida Line ===
- Haijima Sta
- Akishima Sta.
- Tachikawa Sta.
- ||
- Chuo Exp. Tatsuno
- Chuo Exp. Minowa
- Chuo Exp. Ina I.C.
- Chuo Exp. Nishi-Haruchika
- Chuo Exp. Miyada
- Chuo Exp. Komagane I.C.
- Iijima
- Matsukawa
- Takamori
- Kami-Iida
- Igara
- Iida Sta.

=== Kiso-Fukushima Line ===
- Shinjuku Highway Bus Terminal
- Chuo Exp. Mitaka
- Chuo Exp. Jindaiji
- Chuo Exp. Fuchu
- Chuo Exp. Hino
- Chuo Exp. Hachioji
- ||
- Shiojiri Sta.
- Motoyama-juku
- Urushi no Sato Hirasawa
- Narai-juku
- Yabuhara
- Hiyoshi Kisokoma Heights
- Fukushima Inspection
- Kiso-Fukushima Sta.

=== Matsumoto Line ===
- Shinjuku Kosoku Bus Terminal
- Chuo Exp. Hino
- ||
- Nagano Exp. Midoriko
- Nagano Exp. Hirookanomura
- Nagano Exp. Kambayashi
- Matsumoto IC-mae
- Matsumoto Bus Terminal

- Companies:Keio Bus / Matsumoto Electric Railway
- It takes a rest in Futaba SA.

=== Hakuba Line ===
- Shinjuku Kosoku Bus Terminal
- Chuo Exp. Mitaka
- Chuo Exp. Jindaiji
- Chuo Exp. Fuchu
- Chuo Exp. Hino
- Chuo Exp. Hachioji
- ||
- Azumino Swiss Mura
- Azumino Hotaka
- Azumino Matsukawa
- Shinano-Omachi Station
- Hakuba-Goryu
- Hakuba-Cho
- Hakuba-Happo

- Companies:Keio Bus / Matsumoto Electric Railway
- It takes a rest in Futaba SA and Azusagawa SA.

=== HidaTakayama Line ===
- Shinjuku Highway Bus Terminal
- Chuo Exp. Mitaka
- Chuo Exp. Jindaiji
- Chuo Exp. Fuchu
- Chuo Exp. Hino
- Chuo Exp. Hachioji
- ||
- Hirayu Onsen
- Nyukawa
- Takayama Nouhi Bus Center

=== Nagoya Line ===
- Shinjuku Highway Bus Terminal
- Chuo Exp. Mitaka
- Chuo Exp. Jindaiji
- Chuo Exp. Fuchu
- Fuchu Sta.
- Seiseki-Sakuragaoka Sta
- Chuo Exp. Hino
- Chuo Exp. Hachioji
- ||
- Magome
- Nakatsugawa
- Ena
- Mizunami-Tentoku
- Tajimi
- Toukadai
- Kachigawa Sta.
- Sakae
- Nagoya (Meitetsu Bus Center)

== See also ==
- Tokyo - Nagano Line, It used to be running via Chuo Expressway.
