= Yamanashi Kōtsū =

Japanese bus company

Yamanashi Kotsu CO., LTD.
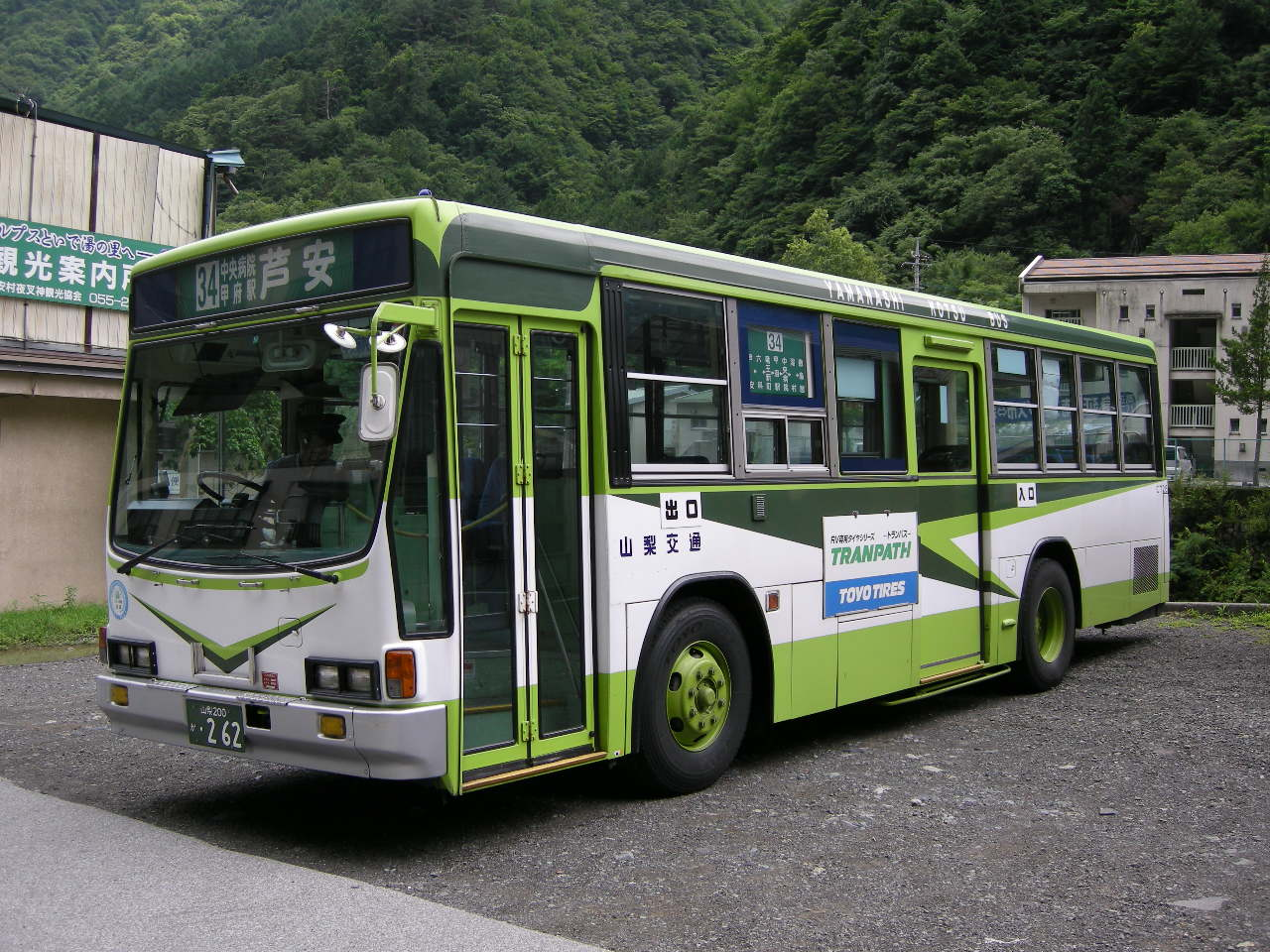
- Isuzu Cubic （Vehicles made by Isuzu are often used）
- Founded: 1 May 1950
- Headquarters: 3-2-34 Iida, Kōfu, Yamanashi, 400-0035 Japan (山梨県甲府市飯田三丁目2番34号)
- Service area: Yamanashi
- Service type: Bus
- Routes: Route map
- Chief executive: Masahide Amemiya
- Website: Yamanashi Kotsu(in Japanese)

Yamanashi Kōtsū (山梨交通) is a bus company in west of Yamanashi Prefecture, Japan.

== Outline ==
This company established in 1May 1945, as merged into many bus, taxi and railway companies.

Kanemaru Family, which Shin Kanemaru came from, established Yamanashi Kotsu in 1950. Kenji Osano, who was a chief executive operator in Kokusai Kogyo Group, invested into Yamanashi Kotsu and became a parent company of that. He helped Yamanashi Kotsu, which was in difficult to operate a lot of deficit routes because he was born in Yamanashi Prefecture.

Yamako Department Store was established by Kokusai Kogyo, and, from the first of establishment until bankruptcy, it connected with Tokyu Group and their department stores.

In 2009, Kokusai Kogyo transferred all their owned shares to Yamanashi Kotsu employee because Kokusai Kogyo got acquired by Cerberus Capital Management from Osano Family.

== History ==
=== Establishment in the first time ===
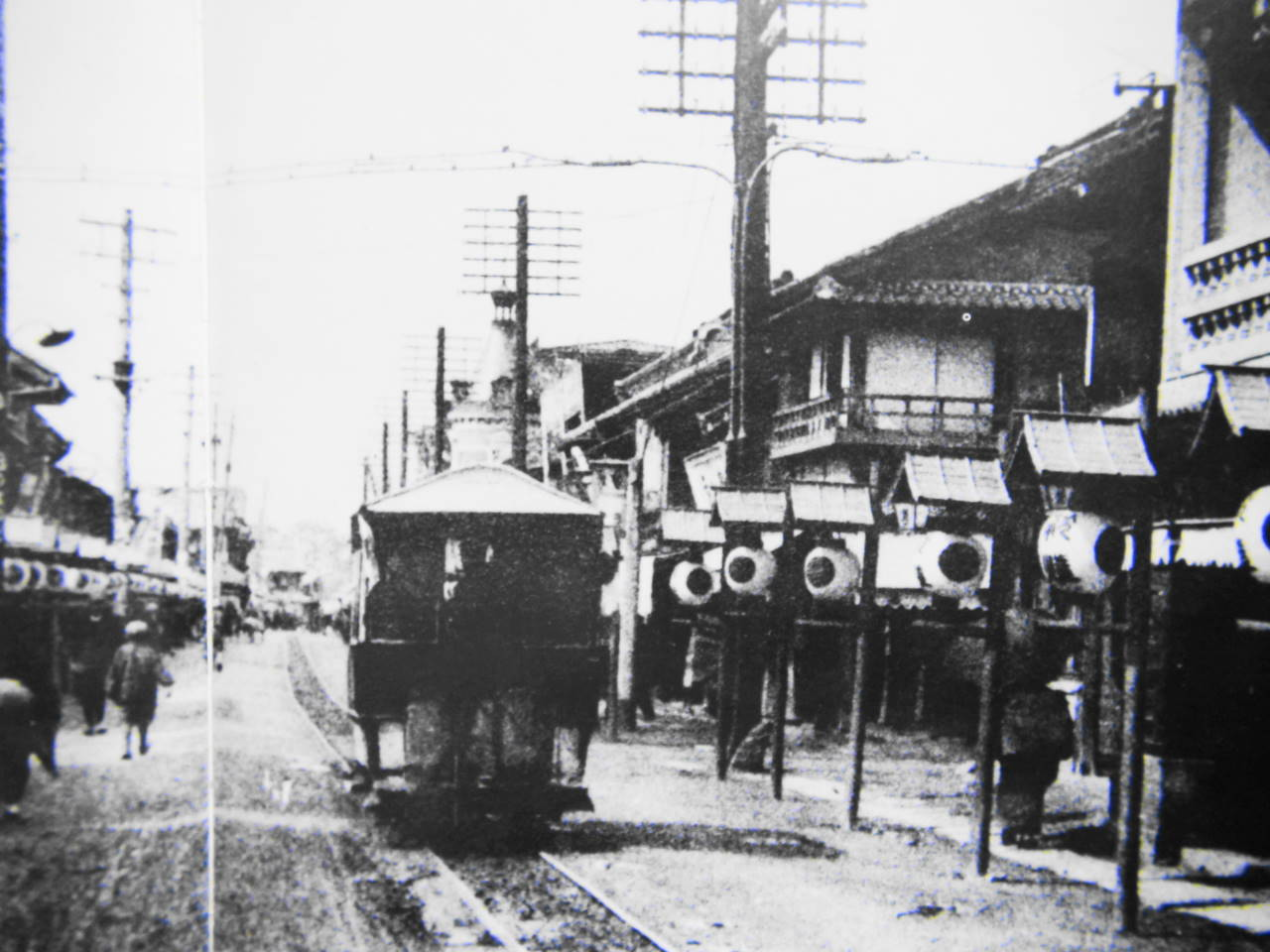
Yamanashi Horse Tram runs on Koshu Kaido

Railway business was established in 1897 as Yamanashi Horse Tram opened between Kofu, Yamanashi and Isawa, Yamanashi

== Area served ==
The company's bus lines serve city of Kōfu and vicinities.

== Highway Bus ==
=== Chūō Kōsoku Bus ===
nickname/line	section	companies
Shinjuku Line	Shinjuku Highway BT (Shinjuku Station)⇔Kofu Station, Yumura Onsen	Fujikyu, Keio Bus
Minobu Line	Shinjuku Highway BT⇔Minami-Alps City Office・Mount Minobu・Minobu Station	Keio Bus
Suwa-Okaya Line	Shinjuku Highway BT⇔Kami-Suwa Station / Okaya Station	Keio Bus, Fuji Express, Suwa Bus, JR Bus Kanto
Inaline	Shinjuku Highway BT⇔Ina City, Komagane City	Keio Bus, Fuji Express, Ina Bus

=== Route Buses ===
nickname/line	Terminus	Via	Terminus
Hirokawara Line	Kofu Station	Ryuo Station	Hirokawara
Shosenkyo Line	Kofu Station	Yumura Onsen	Shosenkyo
Nirasaki Line	Kofu Station	Shiozaki Station	Nirasaki Station
Shimokyorai Line	Nirasaki Station	Daigahara	Shimokyoraiishi

== Subsidiary companies ==
株式会社山交百貨店
- Type: Subsidiary
- Industry: Retail
- Founded: 1954
- Headquarters: 1-3-3 Marunouchi, Kofu, Yamanashi Prefecture Japan (山梨県甲府市丸の内1丁目3-3)
- Parent: Kokusai Kogyo Co., Ltd.
- Website: www.yamako-dept.jp/index.html

Yamako (山交百貨店) had been a department store company in Yamanashi Prefecture, Japan until 30 September 2019. And, since 30 September 2019, the company has specialized in managing parking areas and properties.

== See also ==
- Kokusai Kogyo
  - Kokusai Tohoku
- Tokyu Corporation
  - Odakyu
    - Hakone Tozan Railway
  - Fujikyu
  - Chikuma Bus
