= Kawanakajima Bus =

Bus company in Nagao, Japan

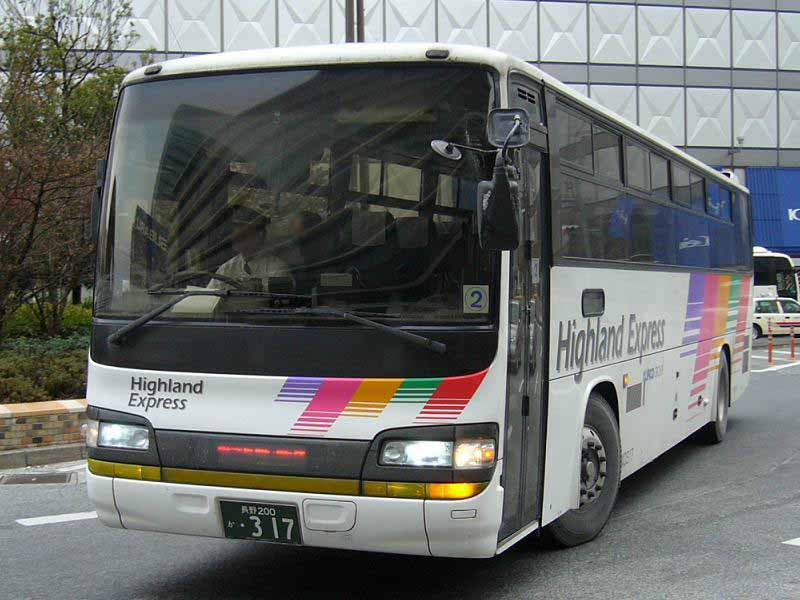
A highway bus owned by Kawanakajima Bus

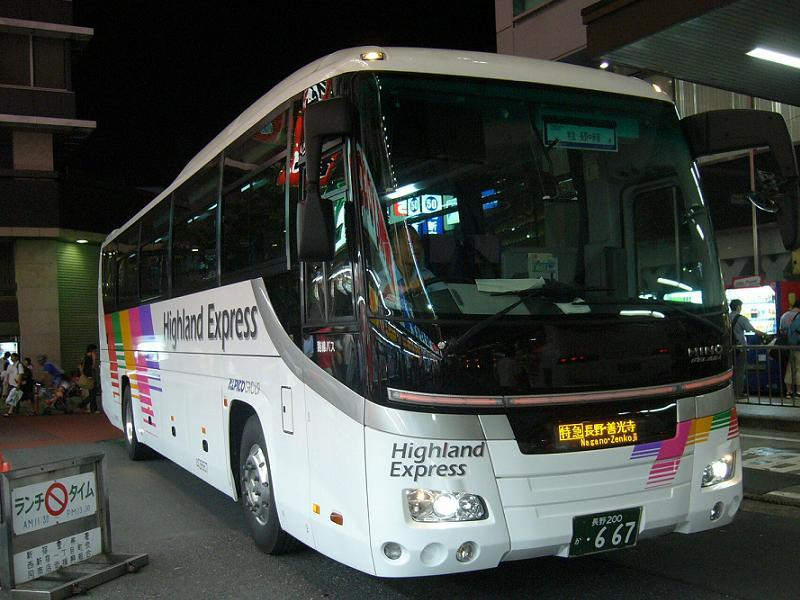
A highway bus owned by Kawanakajima Bus

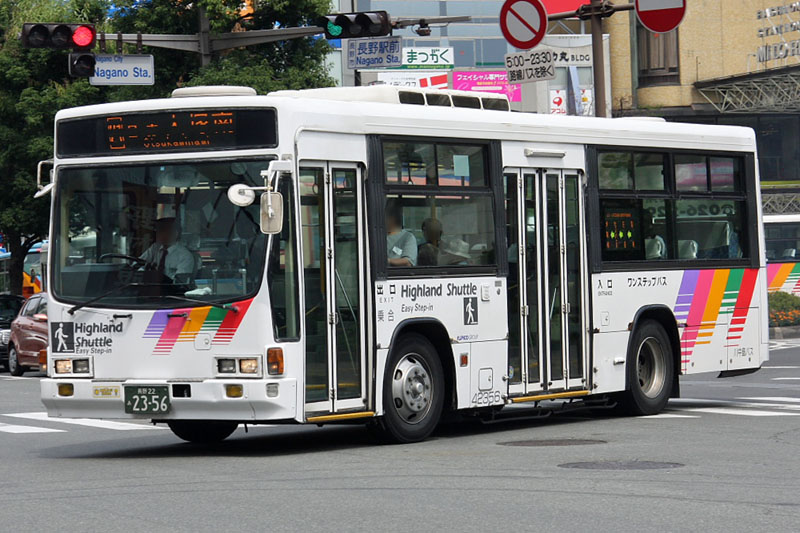
A transit bus owned by Kawanakajima Bus

Kawanakajima Bus (川中島バス株式会社) is a bus company in Nagano Prefecture, Japan.

== Headquarters ==
- 2131-1 Oshimada-machi Nagano City, Nagano Prefecture 381-2212 JAPAN
- Telephone Number: +81-26-254-6700

== Area ==
- Nagano City
- Shinano Town
- Myōkō City, Niigata

etc.

== History ==
- 1925 - Foundation as Kawanakajima Jidōsha (川中島自動車)
- 1966 - Opening of Nagano Bus Terminal
- 1983 - Voluntary petition to Nagano District Court for application of Corporate Rehabilitation Act; Court's election of Itaru Takizawa, then vice president of Matsumoto Electric Railway, as trustee
- 1984 - Joining into Matsumoto Electric Railway Group (Matsuden Group)
- 1984 - Change of corporate name to Kawanakajima Bus
- 1988 - Opening of Misuzu Highway Bus
- 1991 - End of corporate rehabilitation procedures
- 1992 - Rename of Matsuden Group to Alpico Group
- 2006 - Introduction of hybrid coach

== Lines ==
=== Highway lines ===
- Nagano - Shinjuku Line <Keio Dentetsu Bus>
- Alpine Nagano-go (Nagano - Kyoto, Osaka) <Hankyu Bus>
- Chuo-do Kosoku Bus
  - Nagano - Nagoya <Meitetsu Bus>
- Misuzu Highway Bus
- Nagano - Matsumoto - Iida <Ina Bus and Shinnan Kotsu>
- Nagano - Matsumoto <Matsumoto Electric Railway>
- Nagano - Usuda Line <Chikuma Bus>
- Nagano - Kamikōchi (closed at winter season)
- Nagano - Myokokogen (opened at winter season)

== See also ==
- Matsumoto Electric Railway
- Suwa Bus
