= Shibuya Mark City =

Building complex in Shibuya, Tokyo

Coordinates: 35.6581085°N 139.6986263°E

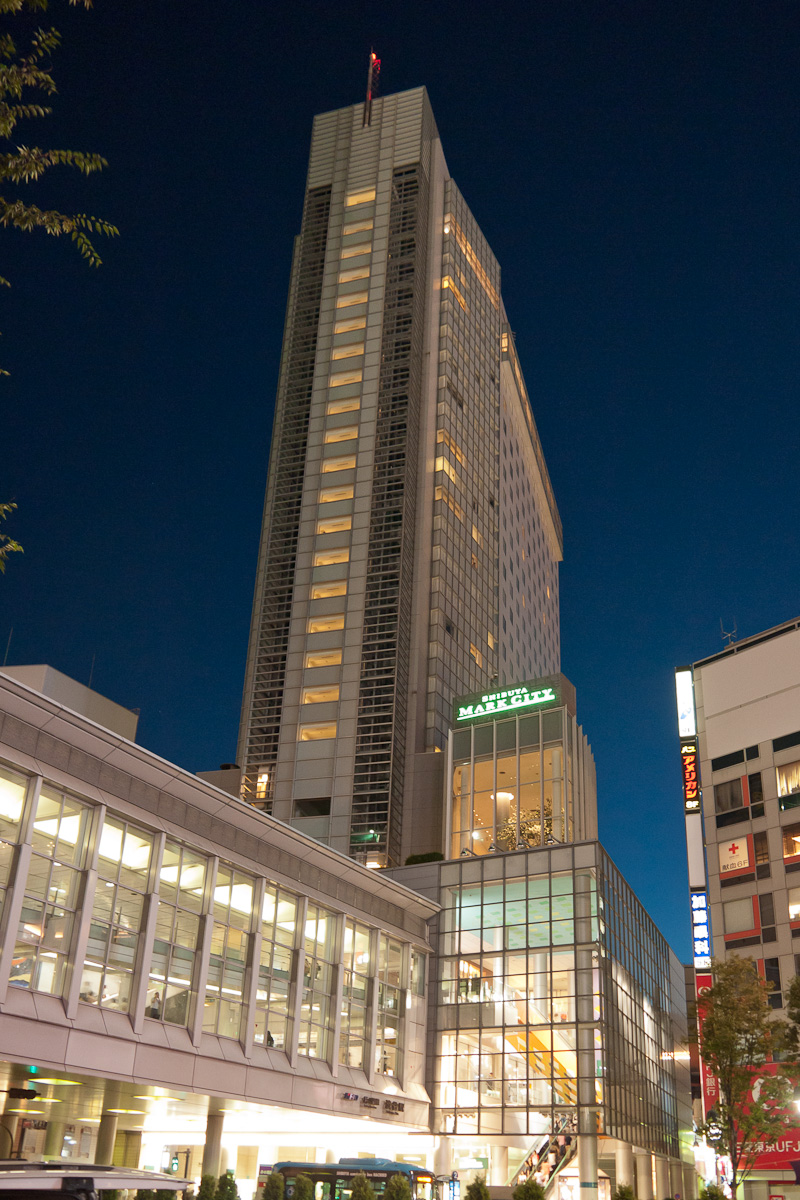
- Shibuya Mark City East building
- Native name: 株式会社渋谷マークシティ
- Romanized name: Kabushiki Kaisha Shibuya Māku Shitī
- Industry: Real estate
- Founded: April 7, 2000; 26 years ago in Shibuya, Tokyo, Japan
- Headquarters: Shibuya, Tokyo, Japan
- Services: Hotel, retail space, office space, bus terminal, train station, parking
- Website: www.s-markcity.co.jp

Shibuya Mark City (株式会社渋谷マークシティ, Kabushiki-gaisha Shibuya Māku Shitī) is a facility located in Shibuya, Tokyo, owned by Shibuya Mark City company. There are two buildings, "East" (Hotel side) and "West" (Office side). It was built and opened on April 7, 2000, targeting mainly women, collaborating with Keio Corporation.
