= Asama Onsen =

Thermal spring in Nagano Prefecture, Japan

Coordinates: 36.26°N 137.99°E

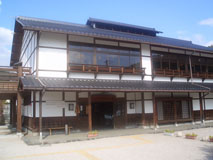
Asama Onsen

Asama Onsen (浅間温泉) is an onsen located in the city of Matsumoto, Nagano Prefecture, Japan.

The Asama Hot Spring Center, also known as the Hot Plaza Hall, has a configuration typical of many Japanese onsen with separate areas for males and females; each area contains multiple indoor pools, saunas and two outdoor pools, one hot and one cold. The published temperature range of this onsen is 42-47 degrees Celsius.

Between 1969 and 2011, Asama Onsen included an open-air speed skating rink.
