= Shikoku Kōsoku Bus =

Japanese bus company

Shikoku Kōsoku Bus Co., Ltd. (四国高速バス株式会社, Shikoku Kōsoku Basu Kabushiki-gaisha) is a bus company in Kagawa Prefecture, Japan. The company operates only expressway route buses.

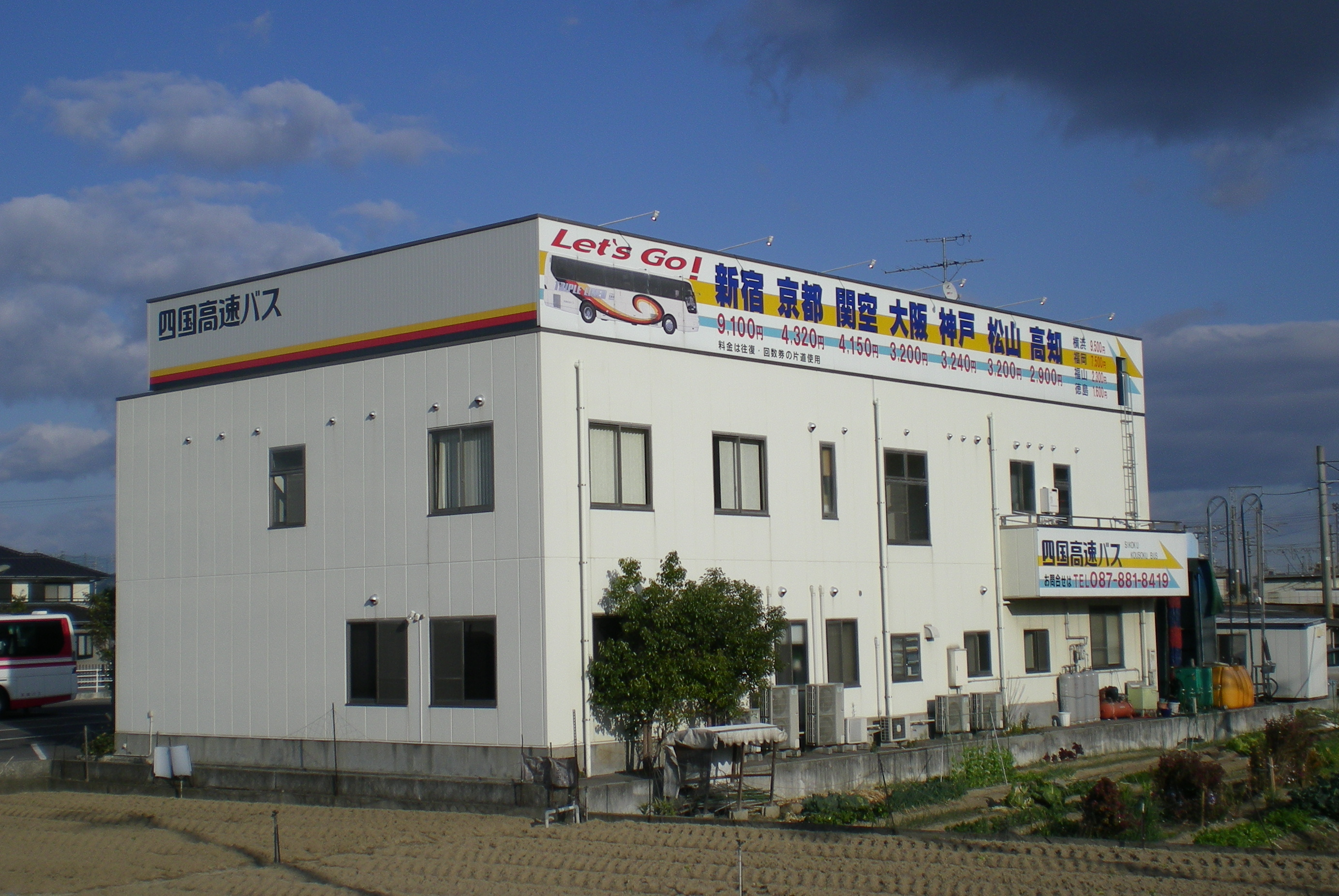
Shikoku Kousoku Bus Co. (Kagawa,Japan)

== Bus Lines ==
The nickname of bus line in bold.

=== Expressway Buses runs midnight ===
- For Tokyo
  - Shinjuku Line (**Hello Bridge**, Marugame, Takamatsu～Yokohama, Shinjuku, Hachioji); servicing it in collaboration with Nishi Tokyo Bus
- For Nagoya
  - Nagoya Line (**Sanuki Express Nagoya**, Marugame, Takamatsu～Nagoya)
- For Fukuoka
  - Fukuoka Line (**Sanuki Express Fukuoka**, Takamatsu, Marugame～Fukuoka); servicing it in collaboration with Nishitetsu Kosoku Bus (a group of Nishi-Nippon Railroad)

==== Past lines ====
- For Yokohama
  - Yokohama Line (**Sanuki Express Yokohama**, Marugame, Takamatsu～Yokohama); servicing it in collaboration with Kotosan Bus - defunct on November 30, 2008

=== Expressway Buses runs in daytime ===
- For Kansai region
  - Kyoto Line (**Takamatsu Express Kyoto**, Takamatsu～Kyoto); servicing it in collaboration with Keihan Bus (a company of Keihan Electric Railway group), JR Shikoku Bus and Nishinihon JR Bus
  - Osaka Line (**Sanuki Express Osaka**, Takamatsu～Namba, Osaka); servicing it in collaboration with Hankyu Bus (a company of Hankyu Hanshin Holdings), JR Shikoku Bus and Nishinihon JR Bus
  - Osaka Line (**Sanuki Express Osaka**, Marugame, Zentsuji〜Kobe, Osaka, Namba, Universal Studios Japan)
  - Kansai Airport Line (**Kansai Airport Limousine Bus**, Takamatsu～Kansai Int'l Airport); servicing it in collaboration with JR Shikoku Bus, Nankai Bus (a company of Nankai Electric Railway group) and Kansai Airport Limousine.
  - Kobe Line (**Sanuki Express Kobe**, Takamatsu～Sannomiya, Shin-Kobe, Universal Studios Japan); servicing it in collaboration with Shinki Bus, JR Shikoku Bus and Nishinihon JR Bus
- Intercity in Shikoku island
  - Matsuyama Line (**Bocchan Express**, Takamatsu～Matsuyama); servicing it in collaboration with Iyo Railway (Bus division) and JR Shikoku Bus.
  - Kochi Line (**Kuroshio Express**, Takamatsu～Kochi); servicing it in collaboration with Tosaden Kotsu and JR Shikoku Bus
  - Tokushima Line (**Kotoku Express**, Takamatsu～Tokushima); servicing it in collaboration with Okawa Bus

==== Past lines ====
- For Yawatahama
  - Yawatahama Line (**Sanuki Express Yawatahama**, Takamatsu～Uchiko, Ozu, Yawatahama); servicing it in collaboration with Iyotetsu Nan-yo Bus - defunct on March 31, 2010

== References and external links ==
- Shikoku Kōsoku Bus (Japanese)
