= Hakuba Happo-one Snow Resort =

Ski resort in Hakuba, Nagano, Japan

Coordinates: 36°42′07″N 137°50′14″E

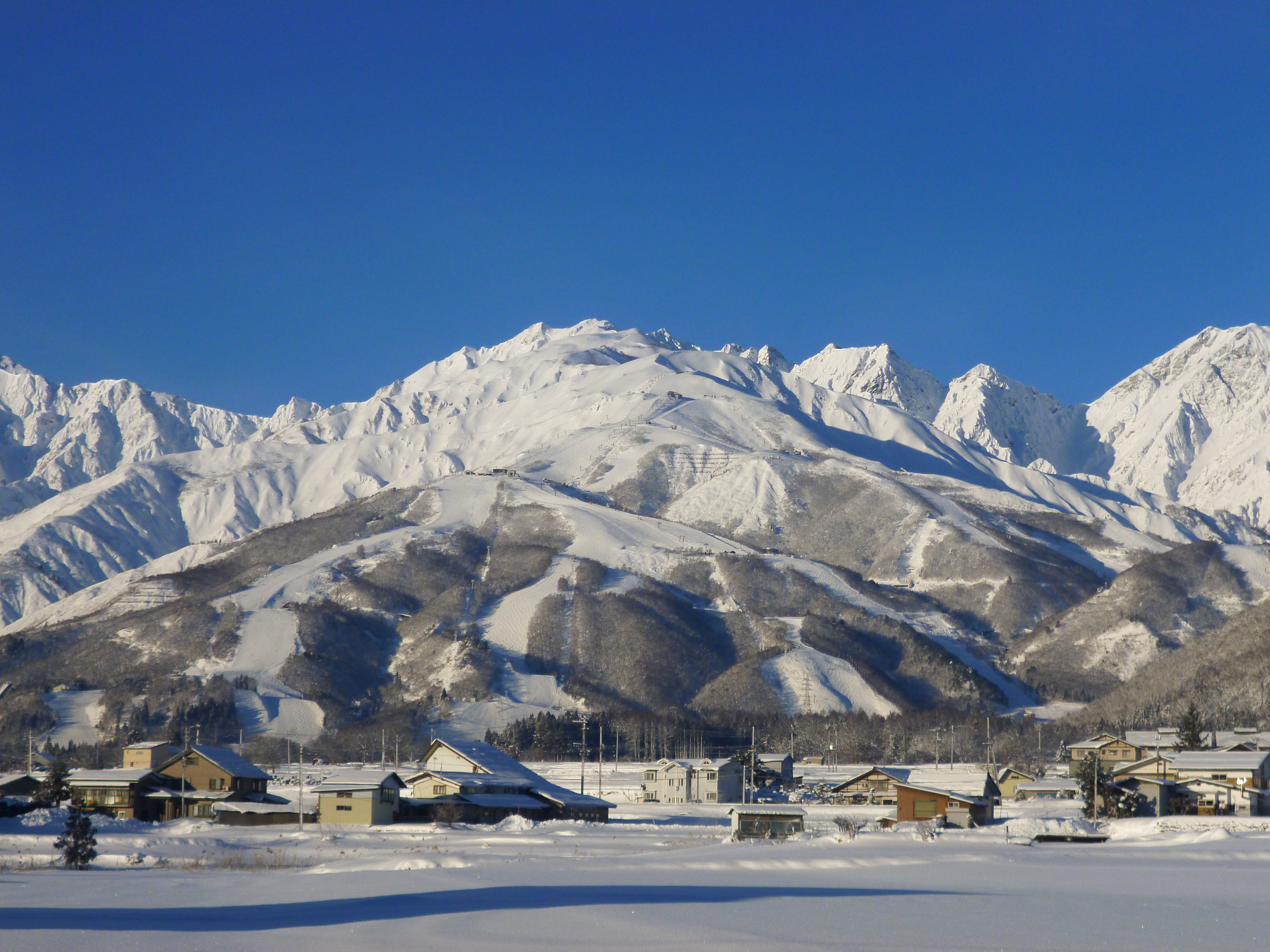
- Interactive map of Hakuba Happo-one Snow Resort
- Location: Hakuba, Nagano, Japan
- Vertical: 1,071 m (3,514 ft)
- Top elevation: 1,831 m (6,007 ft)
- Base elevation: 760 m (2,493 ft)
- Skiable area: 200 ha (494.2 acres)
- Trails: 13
- Lift system: 24 (1 gondola lifts, 5 quad chairlifts, 3 triple chairlifts, and 15 pair chairlifts)
- Website: Hakuba Happo-one Resort

Hakuba Happo-one Snow Resort (白馬八方尾根スキー場, Hakuba Happōone Sukī-jō; HAH-koo-bah HAH-poh-OH-nay) is a ski resort located on Mount Karamatsu in Hakuba, Japan. For the 1998 Winter Olympics in Nagano, it hosted the alpine skiing downhill, super giant slalom, and combined slalom events.

The resort's maximum altitude, 1,831 m (6,007 ft), is the highest of the resorts in the Hakuba Valley. The resort receives an average of about 12 m (39 ft) of snowfall per season.

The resort was constructed in 1958. In the lead-up to the 1998 Games, a test event was held in February 1996 that led to complaints by skiers to the International Ski Federation (FIS) that the 1,680 m (5,510 ft) course for men's downhill was too short. This led to a controversy between the Nagano Organizing Committee (NAOC) and the FIS over lengthening the course by 120 m (390 ft) or 15 seconds at most. NAOC refused on its promise of environmental stewardship despite the fact that FIS pointed out that 600,000 recreational skiers a year competed in that special zone and asked why elite skiers could not compete in the same area. In November 1997, the issue was resolved between the FIS and NAOC by adding an extra 85 m (279 ft) to the run. This was in follow-up to the FIS threatening not to run the event for the Games if the course length issue was not resolved. Course designer Bernhard Russi of Switzerland, the 1972 Winter Olympic champion in the alpine skiing downhill event, agreed to this.
