= JR Bus Kanto Company =

Japanese bus company

JR Bus Kantō Co., Ltd.

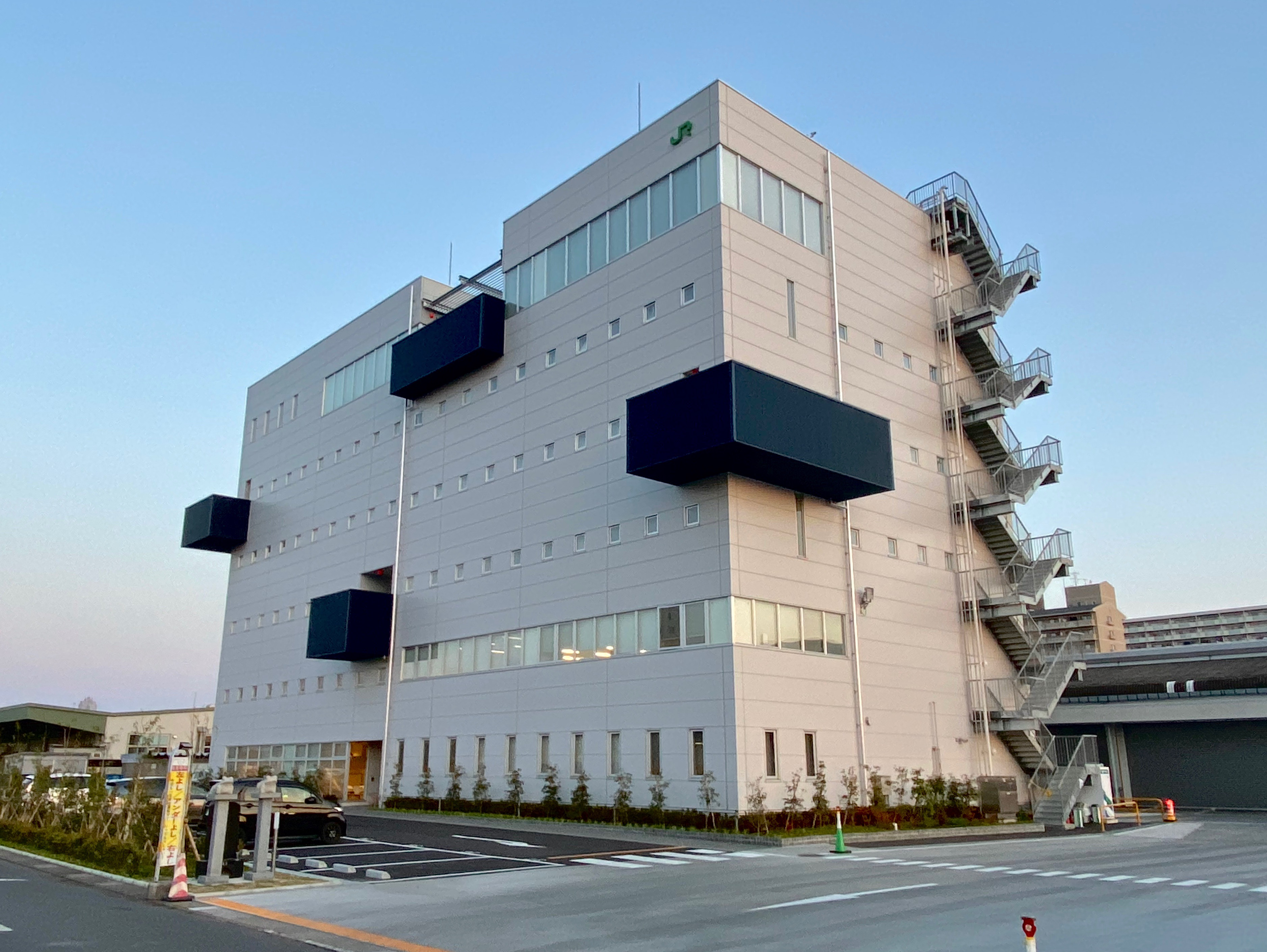
- New headquarters building located within the Tokyo branch premises, relocated in 2021
- Native name: ジェイアールバス関東株式会社
- Founded: 3 March 1988; 38 years ago
- Headquarters: Postal Code 135-0043, Tokyo, Koto- ku, Shiohama 2-18-13, Japan
- Operating income: ▲¥393 million (March 2024)
- Net income: ▲¥588 million (March 2024)
- Owner: Largest single shareholder: East Japan Railway Company (100%)
- Number of employees: 866 (as of 31 March 2024)
- Website: www.jrbuskanto.co.jp

JR Bus Kantō (ジェイアールバス関東株式会社, Jeiāru Basu Kantō Kabushiki-gaisha) is a bus operator of the JR East Group, headquartered in Kōtō-ku, Tokyo. It is part of the JR Bus Group.

With bases in a wide area spanning the Kantō region and Fukushima, Nagano, and Aichi prefectures, the company mainly operates express buses connecting Tokyo with various regions, but also operates regular route buses and chartered buses. In recent years, the company has also been contracted to operate many community buses operated by municipalities.

== Overview ==
It is a wholly owned subsidiary of East Japan Railway Company (JR East Japan). In April 1987, following the privatization of the Japanese National Railways, all bus operations of the Kantō and Tōhoku Regional Motor Vehicle Bureaus and the Ina and Shimo-Suwa Motor Vehicle Offices of the Chūbu Regional Motor Vehicle Bureau were taken over by JR East Japan.

A year later, in 1988, the bus business was split up into separate companies, and JR Bus Kantō was established on 3 March of the same year. On 1 April of the same year, it took over the business in the Kantō and Shinetsu regions and began operations. The Tōhoku region was taken over by JR Bus Tōhoku. However, both companies operated within Fukushima Prefecture, and the border is roughly the Ban'etsu East Line. Some routes in Fukushima Prefecture run on dedicated roads. At that time, the company had 492 vehicles, 888 employees, licensed kilometers were about 2,700 km, and operational organizations were 13 offices, 9 branches, and 2 substations. Originally, the main vehicles in the Kanto area were Isuzu (the bodies were often Teikoku → Hino, and there were more bodies than genuine Kawasaki → IK → Isuzu and Fuji Heavy Industries) and Hino, and Mitsubishi Fuso was the main manufacturer for express buses, but in the former Shinetsu area. There were many Nissan Diesels in the Chūbu area, so the company ended up owning four manufacturers.

As the number of Scania double-decker buses being introduced into highway bus fleets has increased, the partnership with Scania has been strengthened, and the Tokyo branch has become a designated dealer for maintenance services (bus service, accident repair) and sales services (parts sales) for Scania buses.

Regarding vehicle maintenance, the company has built a large-scale maintenance workshop at its Chūō Expressway Branch (currently the Ina Branch) where it also performs vehicle modification and renewal work in-house. It does everything in-house, from engine overhauls and chassis repairs to major specification changes such as reupholstering seat fabric and changing seating arrangements. Recently, it has also shared its maintenance and construction know-how with its Tsuchiura Branch, which is now able to modify second-hand vehicles to its own specifications.

Its main revenue comes from the highway bus business, with routes covering 5,654.8 km (as of 31 March 2023) from Tokyo to the Kantō, Tōhoku, Chūbu, Kinki, and Shikoku regions, from short distances to long distances (night buses), as well as long distances (night buses) connecting Nagano Prefecture with Kyoto and Osaka. It owns 388 vehicles (as of 31 March 2024). Japan recorded a total of 289 million high-speed-rail passengers in 2009. As of 2013, it had 440 vehicles, including 270 highway buses, 122 regular buses, 44 chartered buses, and 4 special buses (articulated buses in Shirakawa). As symbolized by the fact that the majority of its vehicles are highway buses, it is a representative operator of long-distance highway buses in both name and reality, and is a central player in the JR Bus Group in terms of both the number of routes and the number of vehicles.

== Former Presidents ==
- 1st: Kiyoshi Nozawa (1987 - 1992) Former President of Nippon Express Research Institute
- 2nd: Koji Sasaki (1992 - 1996)
- 3rd: Yoichi Yamamura (1996 - 2003)
- 4th: Tamotsu Tokairin (2003 - 2009) Former managing director of the Japan Railway Drivers Association
- 5th: Norihiko Bandai (2009 - 2016) First president of Shinjuku Expressway Bus Terminal
- 6th: Yasuyuki Nakamura (2016 - 2022) Former President of JR Bus Tōhoku, current chairman of the Board of Directors of JR Bus Kantō
- 7th: Ryuichi Kobanawa (2022-) Former President of JR Bus Tōhoku

== Express Bus ==
It is said that JR Bus Kantō's history cannot be discussed without mentioning the express bus business, and many express bus routes were established after the company was founded. In 1989 alone, during a boom in express bus route openings nationwide, 13 routes were launched. The licensed express bus route distance was just over 1,000 km when the company was founded in 1988, but by 1990 it had increased to 4,257 km. As a result of opening one route after another, the company became the largest operator of overnight express buses. Express bus revenue alone accounts for 60% ( percent ) of the company's total revenue.

On the other hand, there have been many cases where their somewhat forceful entry into the market has caused friction with other companies. Starting with the so-called "Chūō Expressway Bus Problem," La Foret, Sirius, and New Breeze were jointly operated by four companies, and the Rakuchin service saw an operator that had planned to enter the market withdraw. However, the company's reliability has increased due to the operational and sales know-how it has cultivated since the early days of Japanese highway buses, as well as its ability to adapt to change, and as of 2011 it has the largest number of joint operators in Japan.

In recent years, as local branches are in charge of express buses departing and arriving in Tokyo, some routes have been opened to send drivers to Tokyo by commercial buses in order to improve efficiency, instead of sending them to Tokyo by train from each branch. In addition, branches scattered along major expressways are used, and a unique operating method is used in which drivers are replaced at approximately the midpoint of the route, reducing the burden on drivers within the legal limits of driving time and distance for one-man operation. In addition, the driver's work and the vehicle's operation are separated, allowing for more flexible movements. As a result, there are cases where the vehicle and the driver do not belong to the same person on some routes. In addition, multiple branches are mobilized for routes with high demand. The company is taking an aggressive stance against tour buses that connect the metropolitan area with other cities, which sell low prices, and fares are diversified by setting various discount fares. In addition, for night buses between Tokyo and Keihanshin, a diverse lineup of vehicles is available to meet various needs, from the low-priced Seishun Eco Dream with four rows of seats and a toilet, to the private Dream Lulier. Furthermore, in July 2018, European-style double-decker buses (Inter City DD type) were introduced to replace the old double-decker buses, and the company continues to evolve.

The number of boarding and alighting points within Tokyo is also increasing, and in addition to the existing terminals of Tokyo Station and Shinjuku Station, Ōji Station, Ueno Station, Shin-Kiba Station, and Yaho Station, Ikejiri-Ōhashi Station, Toei Asakusa Station, and Nakano-Sakaue Station have been added as disembarking -only stations. Bus terminals are also being established in cities and towns, such as the Sano Shintoshi Bus Terminal and the Takodai Bus Terminal. As a new route development other than Tokyo, the "Seishun Dream Shinshu-go" was opened on 1 October 2015, connecting Nagano Prefecture with Kyoto and Osaka. The Ueno Station Iriyaguchi boarding and alighting point was used by the Ueno Bayside Line (Ueno Station - TDL) from the time of its opening, but was closed after the line was abolished and was used for disembarking on the Joban Expressway line (it has now moved to in front of the Tokyo Metro headquarters on Showa-dori). After that, it was used by the Dream bus between Tsukuba Center and Osaka Station (discontinued after shortening to Ueno Station) and the night bus between Tokyo and Kanazawa, but is now used as a departure and arrival point for the company's chartered tours. The Omiya Station West Exit bus stop was used by the ON Liner (Omiya - Narita Airport) from the time of its opening, but when JR Bus withdrew from the line, the bus stop was relocated, and it was also used by the Saitama-Tsukuba bus (Omiya - Tsukuba), but when the bus was discontinued, it is no longer used as a bus stop.

In order to ease traffic congestion in urban areas and tourist destinations, many express bus stops have introduced the park-and-ride system, in which passengers park their final transportation means, such as automobiles, in parking lots set up at bus stops in the suburbs and then transfer to public transportation such as local buses or express buses to reach their destination.

On 8 March 2010, some routes started offering a service for a fee of 500 yen to allow passengers to bring on board folding bicycles and other hand luggage that previously could not be brought on board.

On 16 December 2014, the company joined the Ginza Station/Tokyo Station - Narita Airport route "THE Access Narita" operated by B -Transse Holdings, and changed the boarding point for Narita Airport at Tokyo Station from Yaesu Street to the JR Expressway Bus Terminal and began joint operation. This was well received, and the number of services was increased each time the timetable was revised. As a latecomer, this route is the only one that is eligible for the mental disability welfare certificate discount (on the other hand, in Ibaraki and Fukushima prefectures, it is the only general route bus company that is not eligible). Furthermore, on 1 February 2020, the company merged with Tokyo Shuttle, operated by the Keisei Group, and was reborn as the "Airport Bus Tokyo-Narita" jointly operated by eight companies, becoming "Japan's largest airport bus company" with 284 round trips per day. After that, demand declined due to the spread of the coronavirus infection, and the number of services was significantly reduced.

At Busta Shinjuku, counter 2 is the counter for JR Bus Kanto (Express Bus Net) (tickets are only available for routes departing and arriving at Busta Shinjuku).

JR Bus Tokyo Station will open an information counter in the ticket office that offers English and Chinese services from 10 December 2017.

The company outsources the Tokyo, Nagano-Keihanshin route west of Shinshiro or Ogurogawa, and the Tokyo-Kanazawa route north of Tobu Yunomaru to West Japan JR Bus, the Tsukuba route and part of the Tomei Expressway Nagoya route to JR Bus Tech, part of the Isesaki route to Gunma Chūō Bus, the Kani route to Tono Railway, and the Tokushima route to Tokushima Bus. Overnight services are not outsourced to tourist bus companies.

As of April 2023, the bus industry is facing a serious shortage of drivers, which has affected our company and our joint operating company, resulting in reduced service on the Iwaki-go and Tokyo Station-Takodai Bus lines. The Tokyo Station-Takodai Bus line was withdrawn on 30 November 2023.
