= Meitetsu Bus =

Japanese bus company

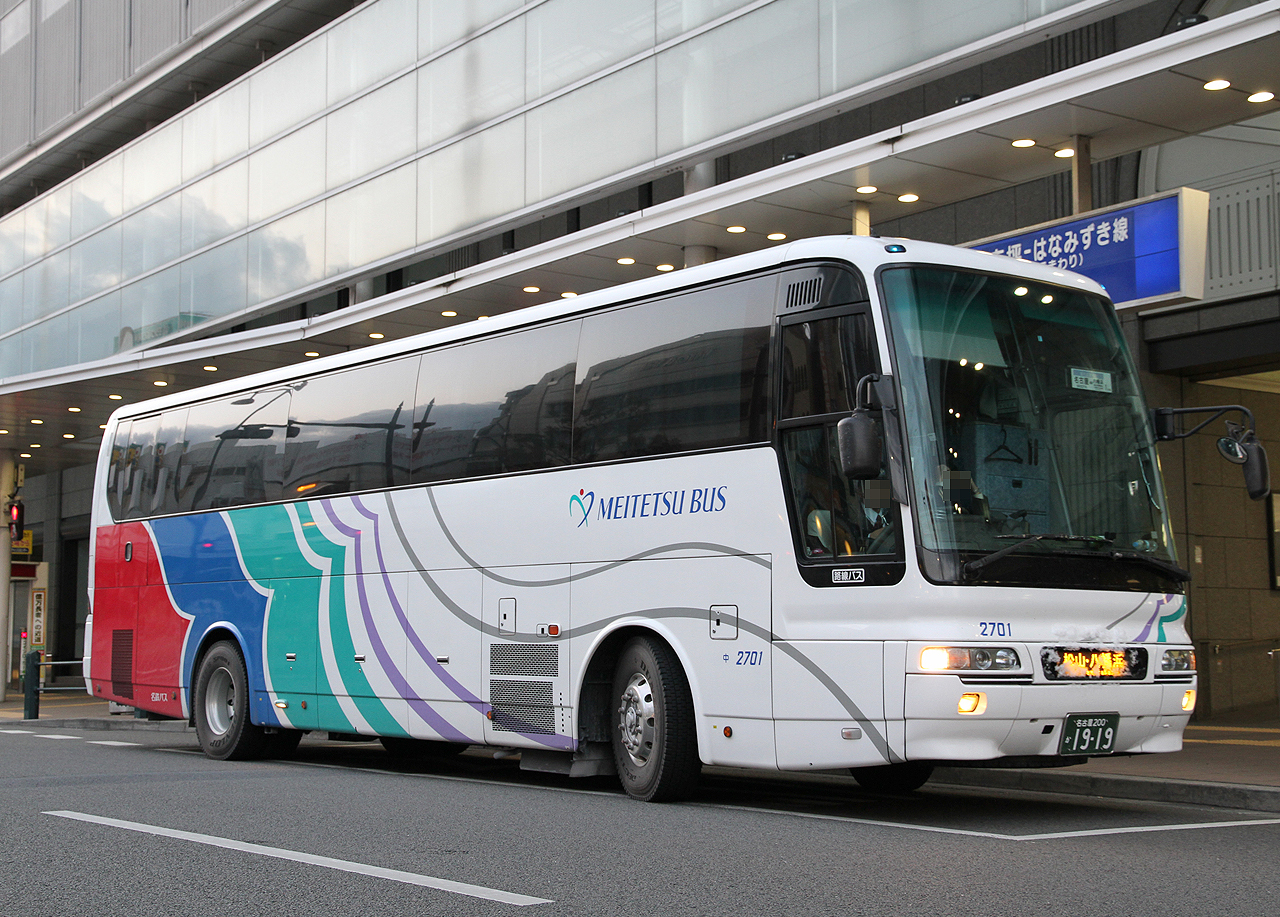
Meitetsu bus (2012)

Meitetsu Bus Co., Ltd. (名鉄バス株式会社, Meitesu Basu Kabushiki-gaisha) is a bus company in the Meitetsu Group.

== Bus lines ==
=== Highway buses ===
- Chuo Highway Bus
  - Meitetsu BC - Shinjuku
  - Meitetsu BC - Iida
  - Meitetsu BC - Ina, Komagane, Minowa
  - Meitetsu BC - Matsumoto
  - Meitetsu BC - Nagano
  - Meitetsu BC - Niigata
- Hokuriku Expressway Bus
  - Meitetsu BC - Fukui
  - Meitetsu BC - Kanazawa
- Tokai Hokuriku Expressway Bus
  - Meitetsu BC - Takayama
  - Meitetsu BC - Toyama
- Meishin Highway Bus
  - Meitetsu BC - Kyoto Station
  - Meitetsu BC - Kobe
- Others
  - Dontaku
    - Meitetsu BC - Kitakyushu, Fukuoka
  - Aoba
    - Meitetsu BC - Sendai
  - Nagoya - Aichi Gakuen University
  - Nagoya - Toyota
  - Nagoya - Komaki, Meiji-mura
  - Nagoya - Tajimi
  - Nagoya - Seki, Mino
  - Nagoya - Nagashima Spa Land (via Higashi Meihan Expressway)
  - Nagoya - Fuji-Q Highland, Lake Kawaguchi, Fujiyoshida (*Seasonal operation)
  - Nagoya - Nara
  - Sanuki Express
    - Meitetsu BC - Takamatsu, Marugame
  - Orange Liner
    - Meitetsu BC - Matsuyama, Yawatahama
  - Nagoya - Tokushima (*Seasonal operation)
  - Glover
    - Meitetsu BC - Nagasaki
  - Shiranui
    - Meitetsu BC - Kumamoto

== See also ==
- Gifu Bus
