= Akasaka Station (Yamanashi) =

Railway station in Tsuru, Yamanashi Prefecture, Japan

Akasaka Station 赤坂駅
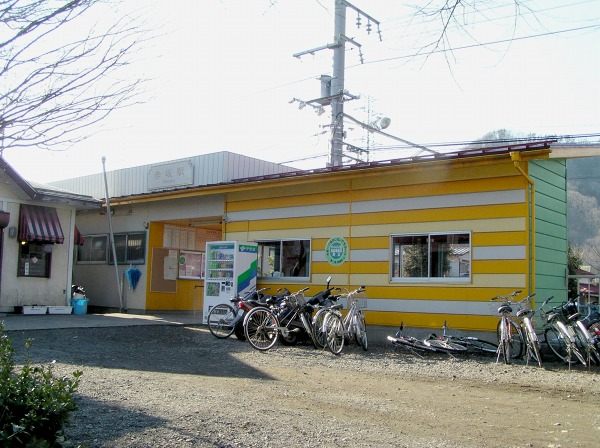
- Akasaka Station, February 2006

General information
- Location: 87–2 Yokkaichiba, Tsuru-shi, Yamanashi-ken; Japan
- Coordinates: 35°33′58″N 138°54′58″E
- Elevation: 445 m (1,460 ft)
- Operator: Fuji Kyuko
- Line: ■ Fujikyuko Line
- Distance: 7.1 km from Ōtsuki
- Platforms: 1 side platform
- Tracks: 1

Other information
- Status: Unstaffed
- Station code: FJ05
- Website: Official website

History
- Opened: 19 June 1929

Passengers
- FY2015: 778 daily
Location
- Location within Yamanashi Prefecture Location within Japan

Akasaka Station (赤坂駅, Akasaka-eki) is a railway station on the Fujikyuko Line in the city of Tsuru, Yamanashi, Japan, operated by Fuji Kyuko (Fujikyu).

== Lines ==
Akasaka Station is served by the 26.6 km (16.5 mi) privately operated Fujikyuko Line from Ōtsuki to Kawaguchiko, and lies 7.1 kilometres (4.4 mi) from the terminus of the line at Ōtsuki Station.

== Station layout ==
The station is unstaffed, and consists of a single side platform serving a single bidirectional track. It has a waiting room and toilet facilities.

== Adjacent stations ==
«	Service	»
Fujikyuko Line
Kasei	Local	Tsurushi
Fujisan Tokkyū: Does not stop at this station
Fuji Tozan Densha: Does not stop at this station

== History ==
Akasaka Station opened on 19 June 1929.

== Passenger statistics ==
In fiscal 1998, the station was used by an average of 1,239 passengers daily.

== Surrounding area ==
- Katsura High School

== See also ==
- List of railway stations in Japan
