= Fujikyu 6000 series =

Japanese train type

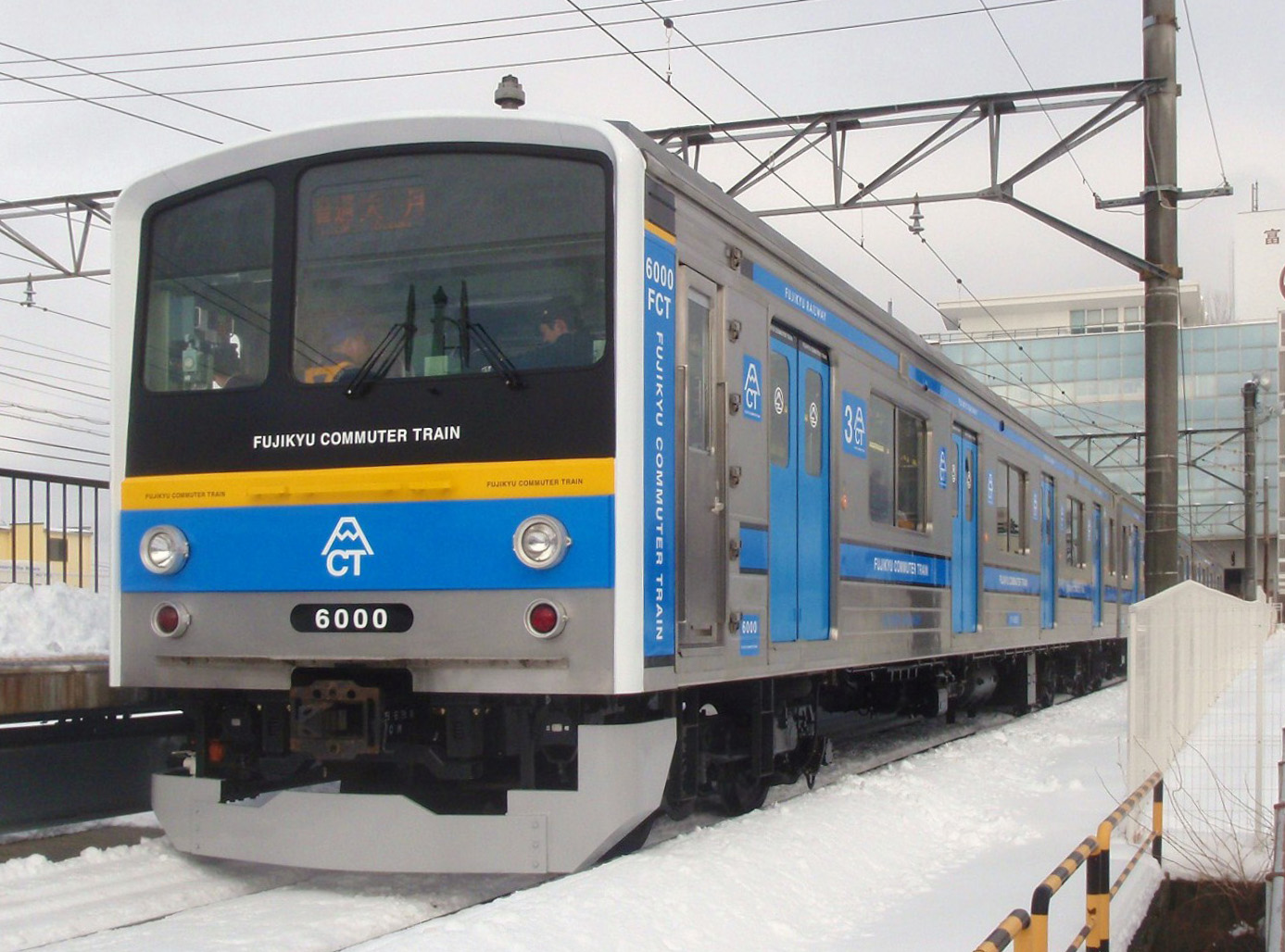
- Set 6501 on the first day of operations, February 2012
- In service: February 2012 – present
- Replaced: 1000 series
- Constructed: 1985–1991
- Entered service: 29 February 2012
- Refurbished: 2011–2012, 2018–2019
- Number in service: 21 vehicles (7 sets)
- Formation: 3 cars per set
- Capacity: 448
- Operators: Fujikyu
- Lines served: Fujikyuko Line

Specifications
- Car body construction: Stainless steel
- Car length: 19.615 m (64 ft 4.2 in) (car 1); 19.5 m (64 ft 0 in) (cars 2, 3)
- Width: 2,870 mm (9 ft 5 in)
- Height: 3,670 mm (12 ft 0 in)
- Floor height: 1,180 mm (3 ft 10 in)
- Doors: 4 pairs per side
- Traction system: MT61 x4 per motor car
- Electric system(s): 1,500 V DC overhead wire
- Current collection: FPS33E single-arm pantograph
- Bogies: DT50 (motored), TR235 (trailer)
- Safety system(s): ATS
- Track gauge: 1,067 mm (3 ft 6 in)

The Fujikyu 6000 series (富士急行6000系, Fuji Kyūkō 6000-kei) is an electric multiple unit (EMU) train type operated by the private railway operator Fuji Kyuko (Fujikyu) on the Fujikyuko Line in Yamanashi Prefecture, Japan, since February 2012. A total of four three-car trains were introduced during fiscal 2011 and 2012, converted from former JR East 205 series EMU cars.

== Design ==
Converted from former JR East 205 series EMU cars, the exterior and interior design of the 3-car 6000 series EMUs was overseen by industrial designer Eiji Mitooka. The second set to enter service, 6001, uses LED lighting throughout.

The first set, 6501, was converted from full-production 205 series cars constructed from 1985 to 1991, and has single-pane passenger windows, while subsequent sets (Set 6001 onwards) were converted from pre-production 205 series cars and have two-pane passenger windows which were originally from Yamanote Line from 1985 to 2005 and then Keiyo Line from 2005 to 2011.

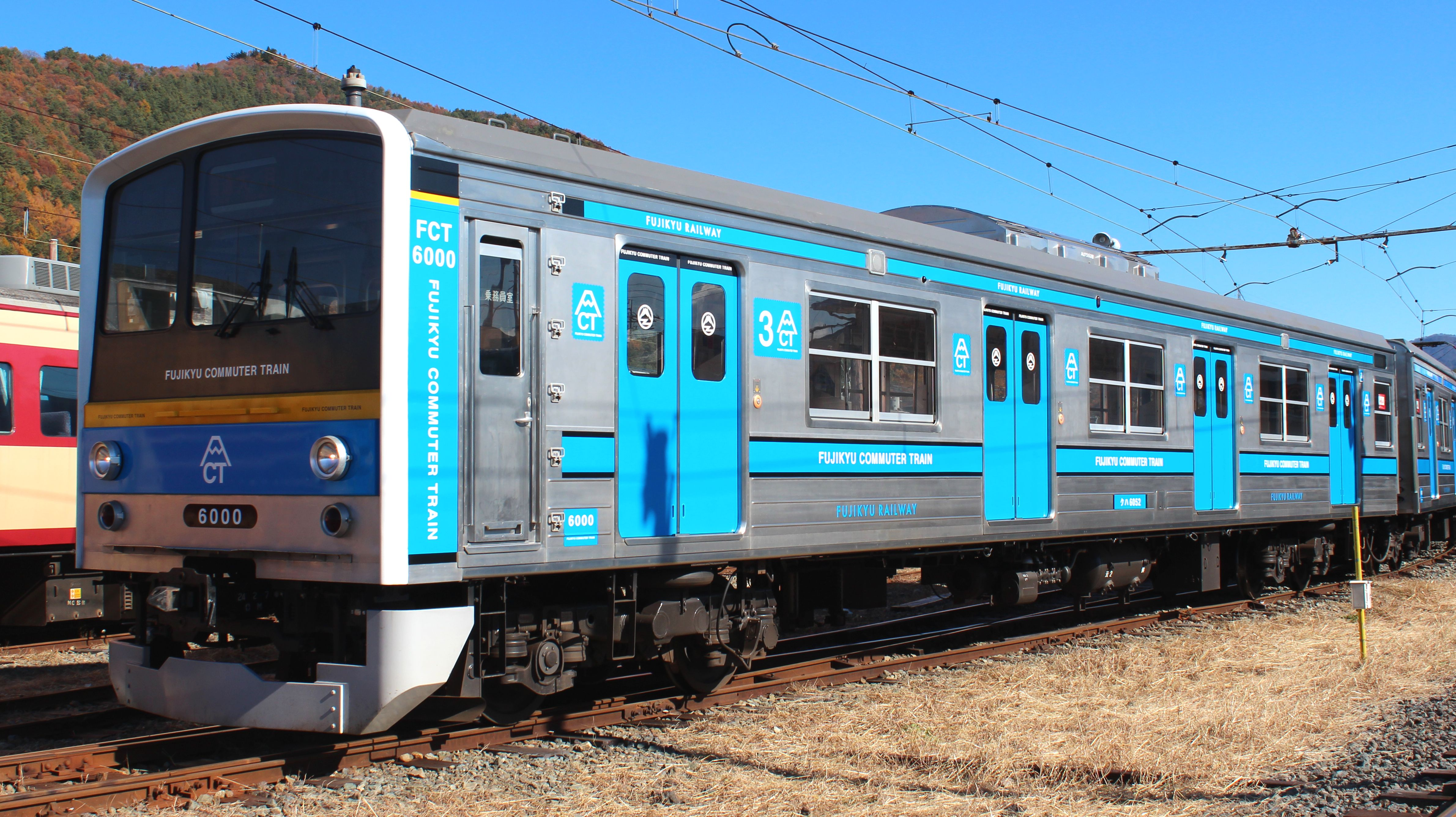
Set 6002, with two-pane side windows, in November 2012

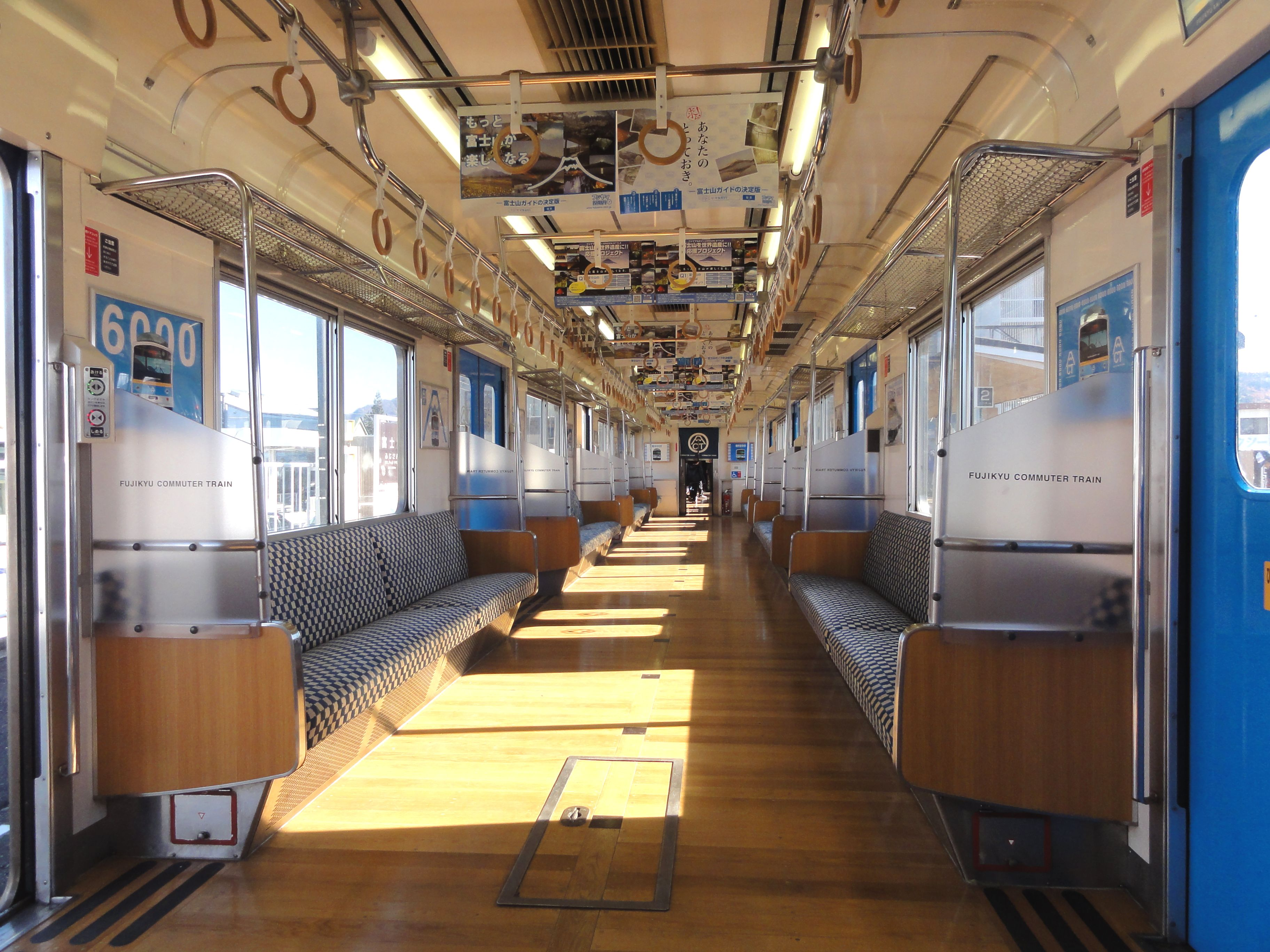
Interior view of set 6501 in November 2012

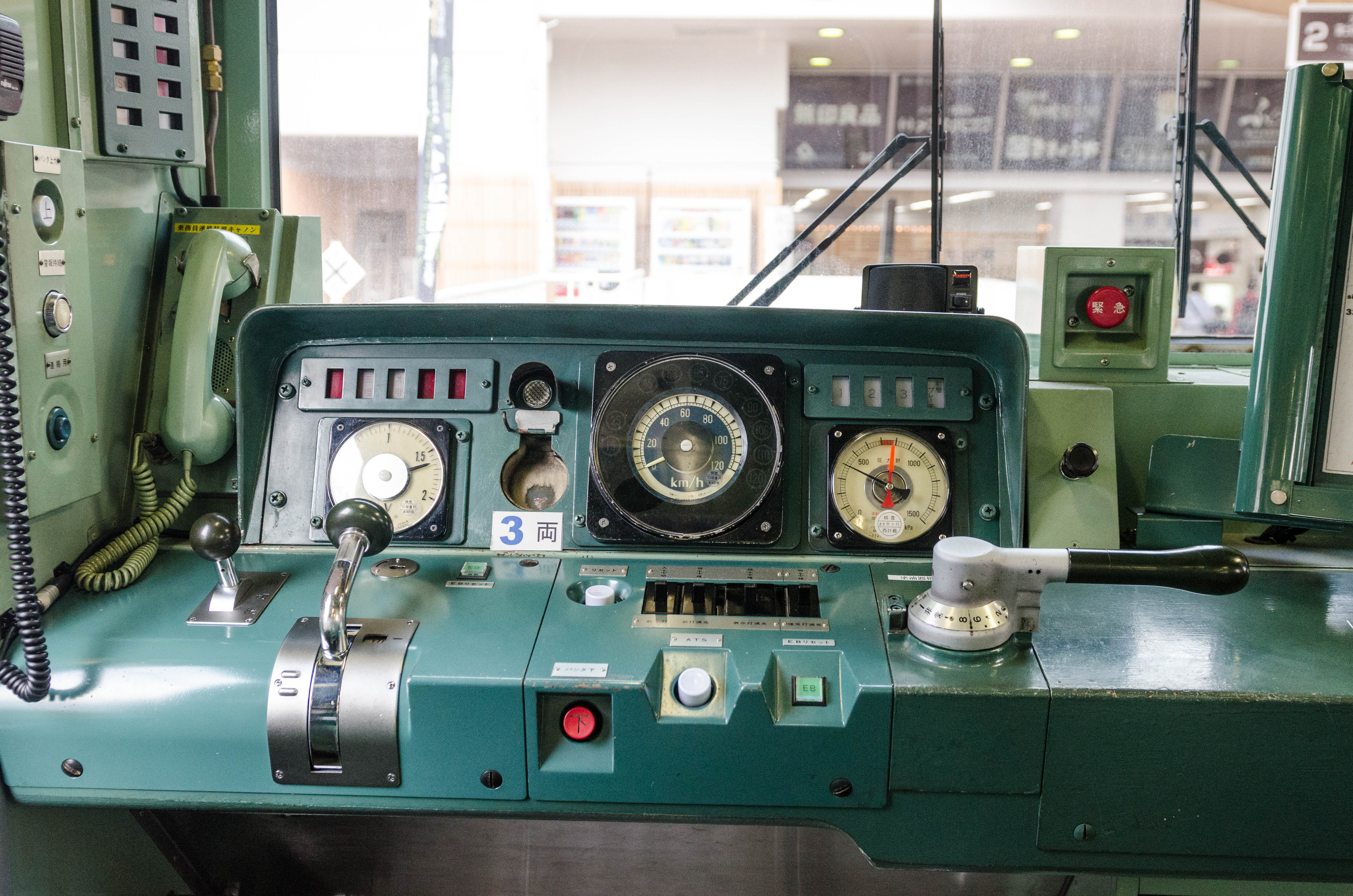
Cab view in August 2013

== Operations ==
The 6000 series trains operate on the 26.6 km (16.5 mi) Fujikyuko Line in Yamanashi Prefecture, which runs between Ōtsuki and Kawaguchiko, and are normally used on all-stations "Local" services.

== Formation ==
The 6000 series are formed as 3-car sets as shown below, with car 1 at the Fujisan end. The first set in service, 6501, was converted from three cars of former Keiyo Line 205 series set KeYo 22. The second set, 6001, was converted from three cars of former Keiyo Line set KeYo 25. The fifth set, 6502, was converted from three cars of former Saikyo Line set Hae 28. The sixth set, 6701, was converted from three cars of former Hachiko Line set Hae 85.

Car No.	1	2	3	Entry into service
Set No.	1	2	3	Entry into service
6001	KuMoHa 6001 (ex MoHa 205-6)	MoHa 6101 (ex MoHa 204-6)	KuHa 6051 (ex KuHa 204-2)	18 March 2012
6002	KuMoHa 6002 (ex MoHa 205-9)	MoHa 6102 (ex MoHa 204-9)	KuHa 6052 (ex KuHa 204-3)	August 2012
6003	KuMoHa 6003 (ex MoHa 205-12)	MoHa 6103 (ex MoHa 204-12)	KuHa 6053 (ex KuHa 204-4)	January 2013
6501	KuMoHa 6501 (ex MoHa 205-33)	MoHa 6601 (ex MoHa 204-33)	KuHa 6551 (ex KuHa 204-11)	29 February 2012
6502	KuMoHa 6502 (ex MoHa 205-287)	MoHa 6602 (ex MoHa 204-287)	KuHa 6552 (ex KuHa 204-107)	21 March 2018
6701	KuMoHa 6701 (ex MoHa 205-3005)	MoHa 6801 (ex MoHa 204-3005)	KuHa 6751 (ex KuHa 204-3005)	22 June 2019
6702	KuMoHa 6702 (ex MoHa 205-3001)	MoHa 6802 (ex MoHa 204-3001)	KuHa 6752 (ex KuHa 204-3001)	26 July 2019
Weight (t)	35.1	35.1	26.8	
Capacity (total)	146	156	146	

The Mc cars are equipped with two FPS33E single-arm pantographs (only one normally used).

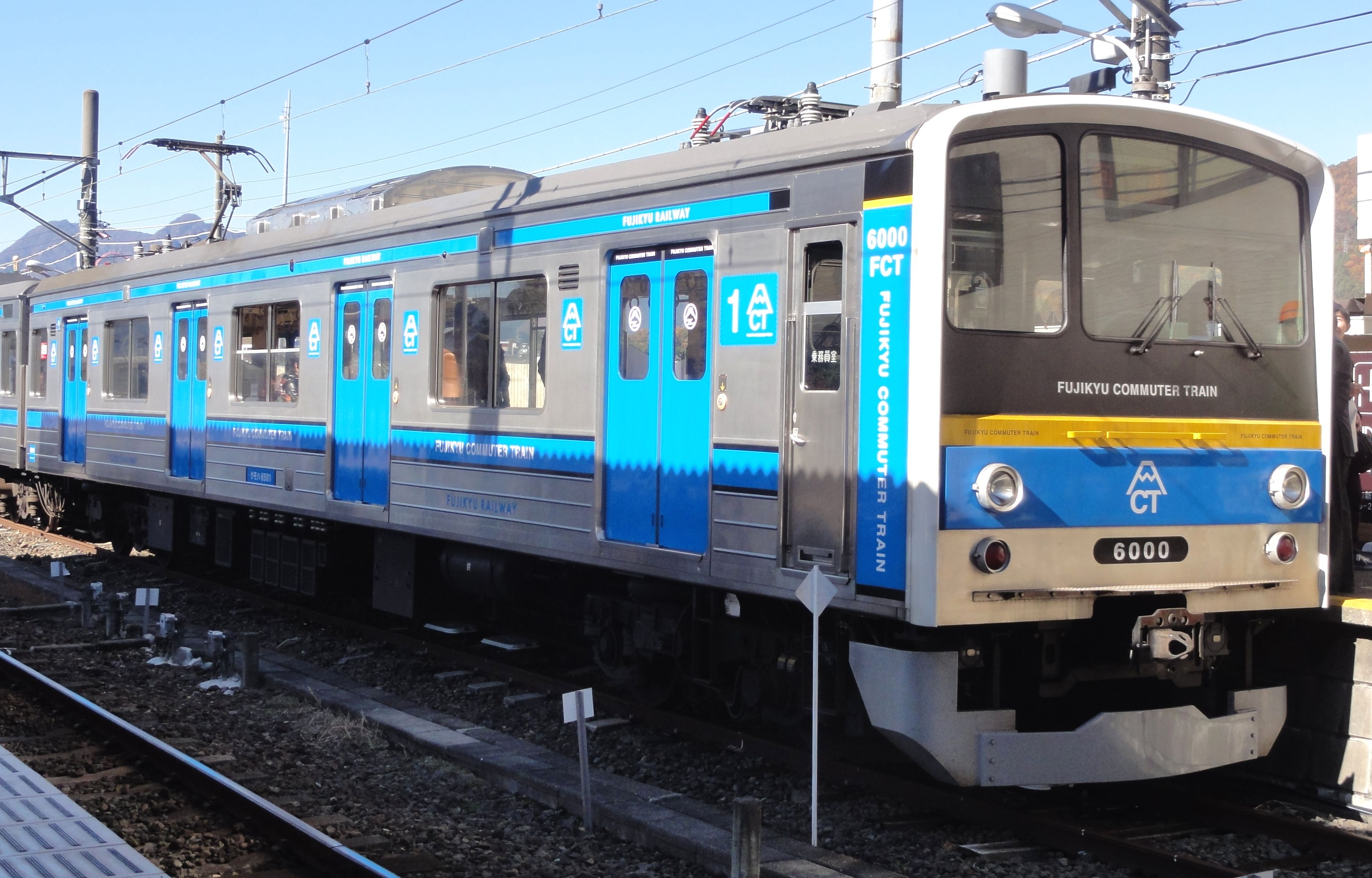
KuMoHa 6501

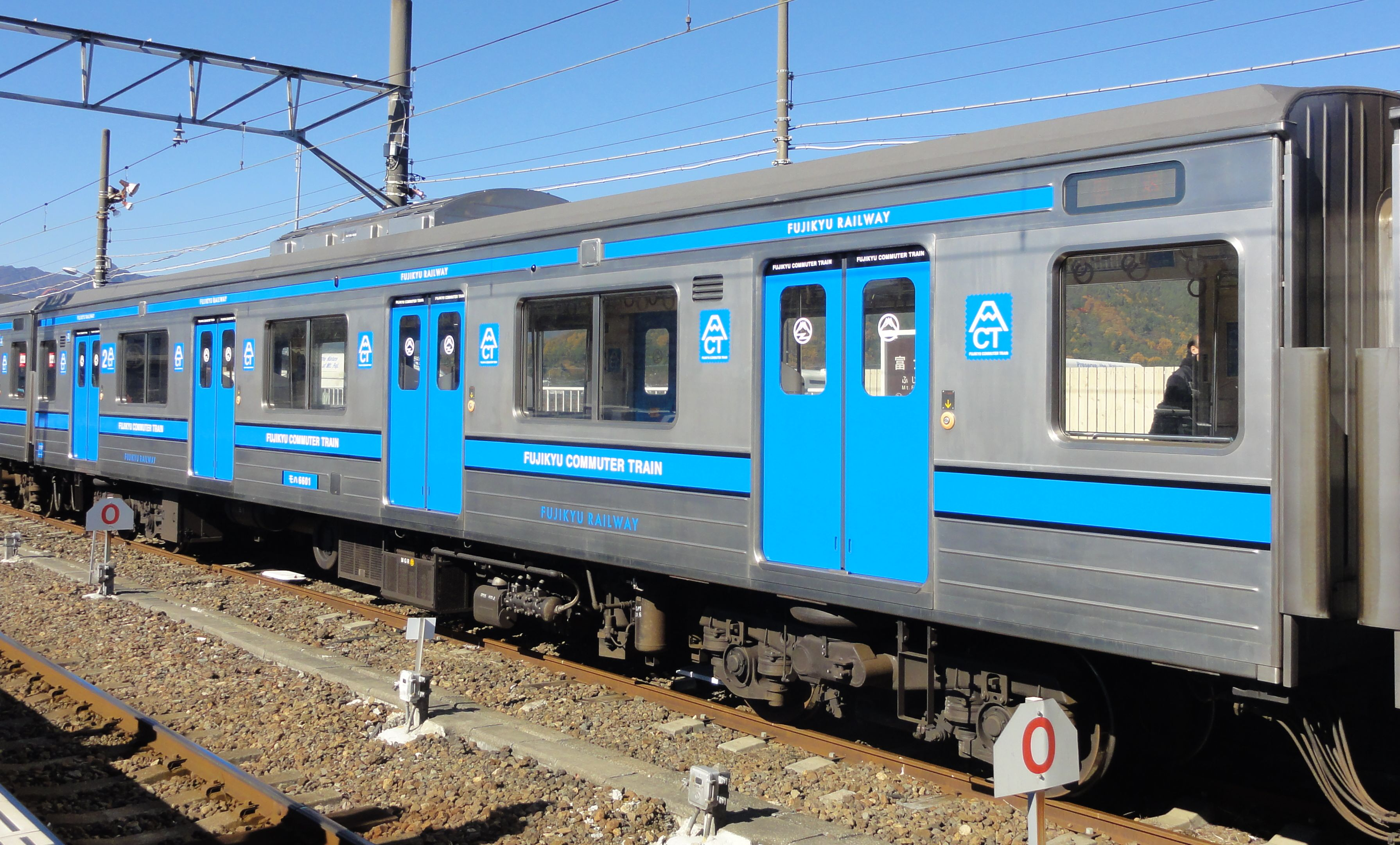
MoHa 6601

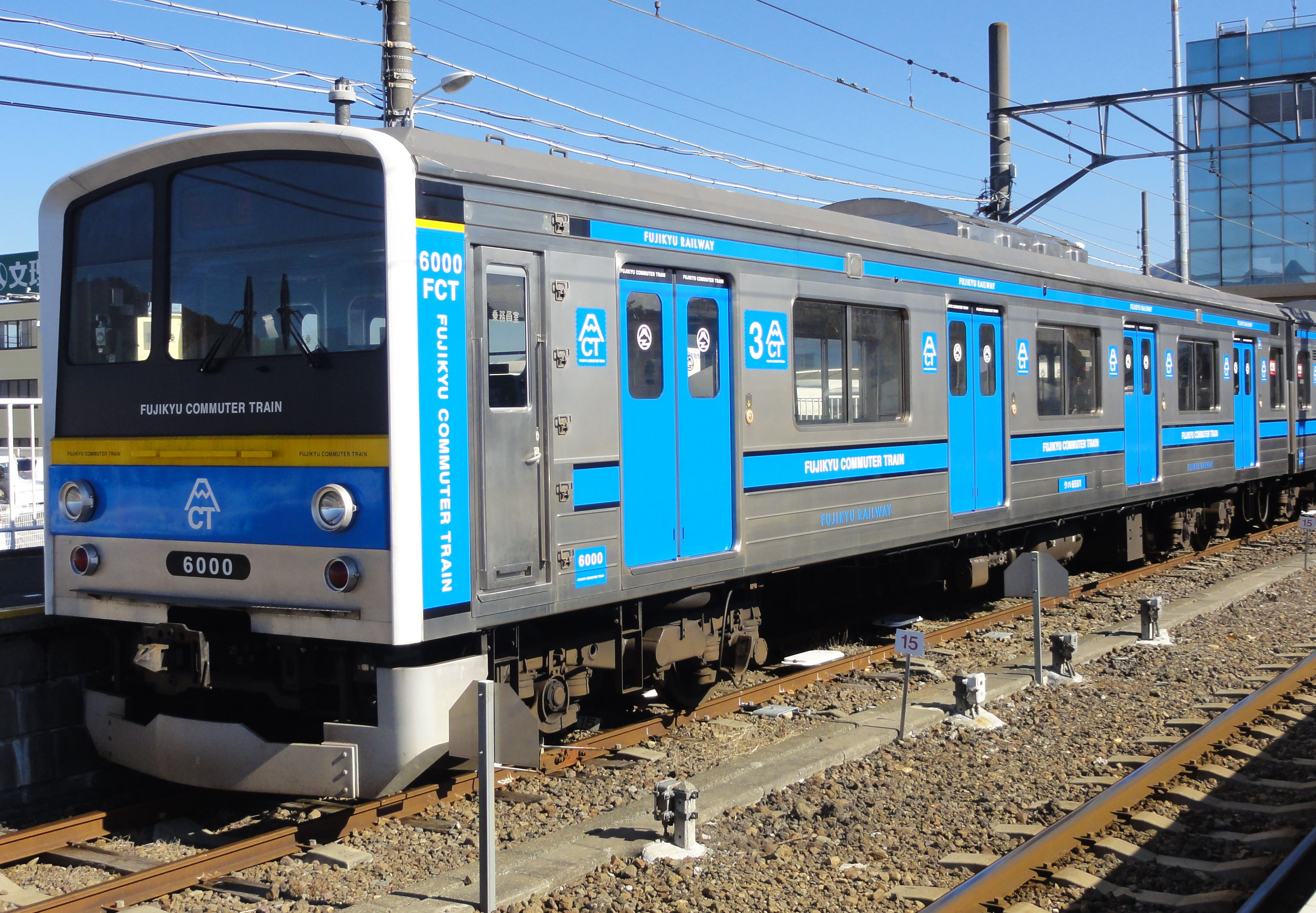
KuHa 6551

== History ==
=== Conversion ===
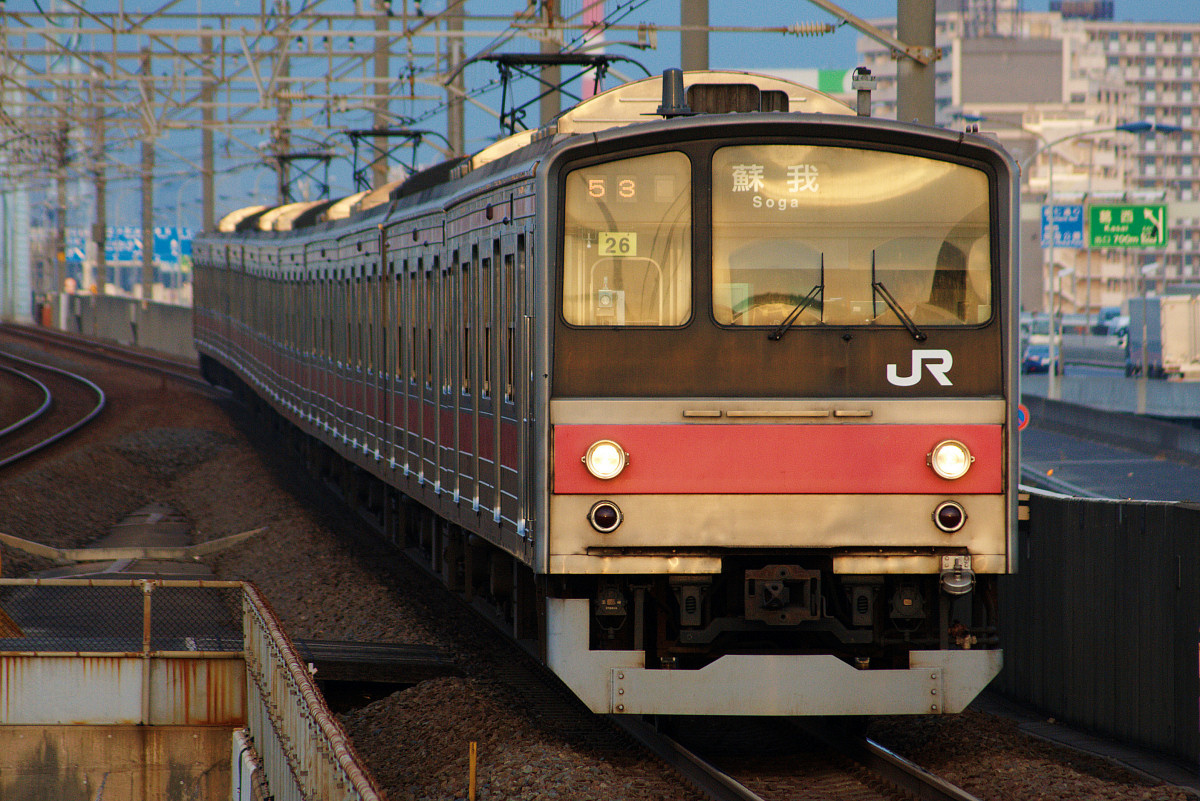
The JR East 205 series Keiyo Line train in January 2009

The first set of three former Keiyo Line 205 series cars was transferred in unpainted form from JR East's Nagano Works to the Fujikyuko Line in October 2011. Modifications involved transplanting a driving cab onto a former intermediate motored car, the provision of LED destination indicators, and passenger-operated door buttons.

The second set (former Keiyo Line set KeYo 25) was transferred to the Fujikyuko Line in January 2012.

Driver training commenced in February 2012, with the units still in unpainted form.

=== Entry into service ===
The first set entered revenue service on 29 February 2012 (a date which can be read as fu-ji-kyu in Japanese). A formal debut event was staged on 18 March 2012, from which date, set 6501 also entered revenue service.

A further four former 205 series cars were purchased from JR East in November 2016.

== Livery variations ==
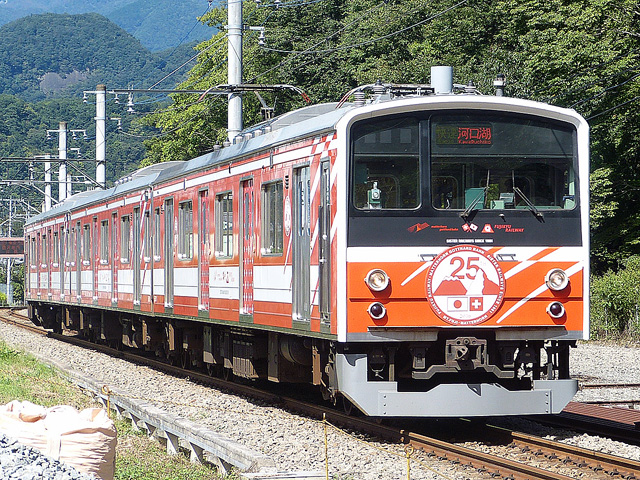
Set 6501 in commemorative red and white livery in October 2016

In September 2016, set 6501 received a special red and white livery based on that of the Matterhorn Gotthard Bahn in Switzerland to mark the 25th anniversary of the signing of a sister railway agreement with the line.
