= Kasei Station =

Railway station in Tsuru, Yamanashi Prefecture, Japan

Kasei Station 禾生駅
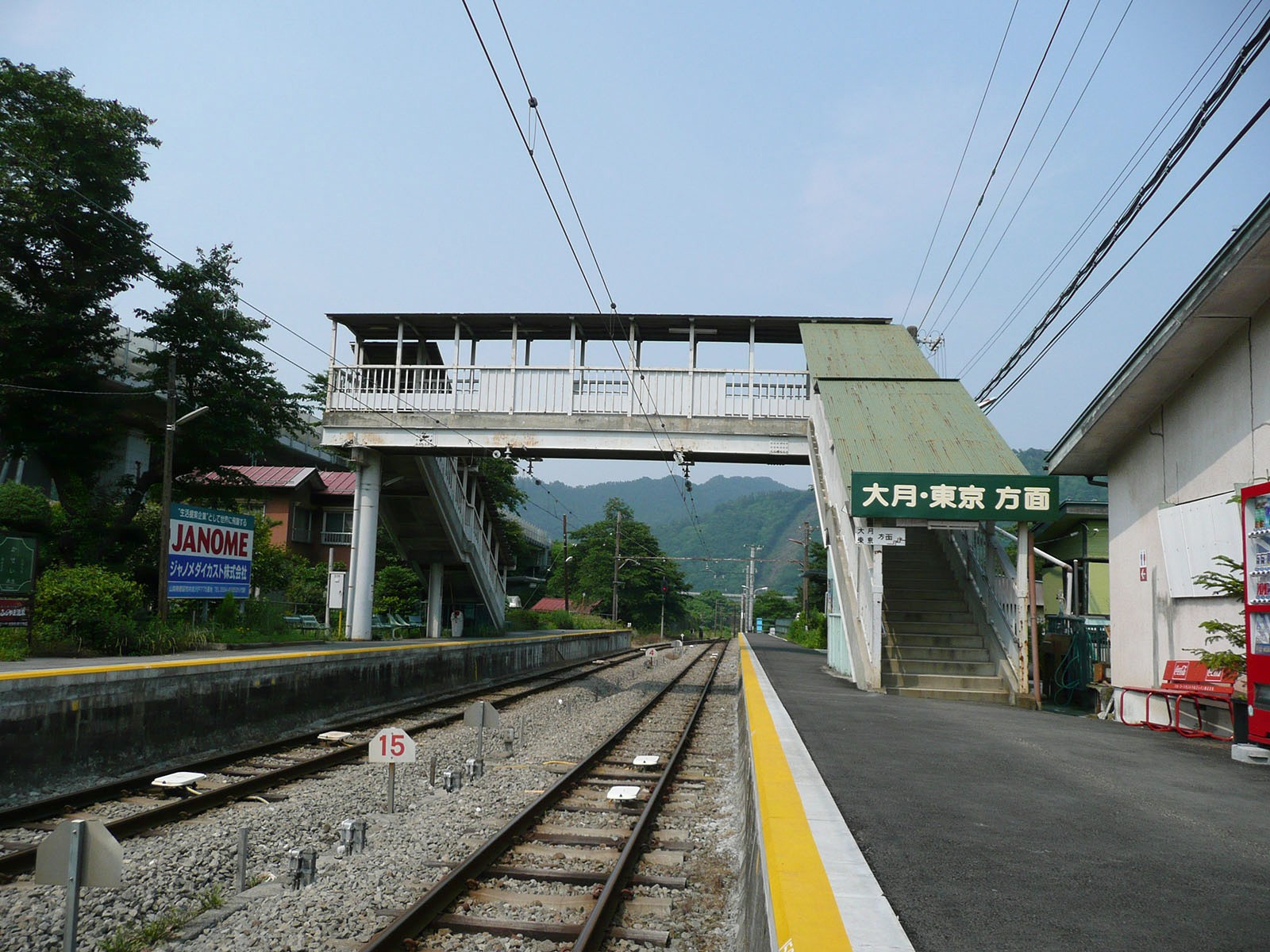
- Kasei Station, June 2009

General information
- Location: 524–3 Furukawado, Tsuru-shi, Yamanashi-ken; Japan
- Coordinates: 35°34′30″N 138°55′45″E
- Elevation: 710 m (2,330 ft)
- Operator: Fuji Kyuko
- Line: ■ Fujikyuko Line
- Distance: 5.6 km from Ōtsuki
- Platforms: 1 side platform
- Tracks: 1

Other information
- Status: Unstaffed
- Station code: FJ04
- Website: Official website

History
- Opened: 19 June 1929

Passengers
- FY2013: 727 daily
Location
- Location within Yamanashi Prefecture Location within Japan

Kasei Station (禾生駅, Kasei-eki) is a railway station on the Fujikyuko Line in the city of Tsuru, Yamanashi, Japan, operated by Fuji Kyuko (Fujikyu).

== Lines ==
Kasei Station is served by the 26.6 km (16.5 mi) privately operated Fujikyuko Line from Ōtsuki to Kawaguchiko, and lies 5.6 kilometres (3.5 mi) from the terminus of the line at Ōtsuki Station.

== Station layout ==
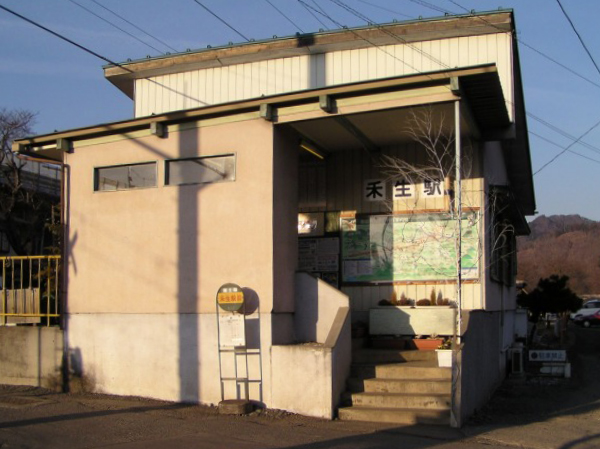
Station exterior, February 2006

The station is staffed and consists of two side platforms serving two tracks, with the station building located on the south (down) side. Passengers cross the tracks via a footbridge. It has toilet facilities.

== Adjacent stations ==
| « | Service | » |
Fujikyuko Line
| Tanokura | Local | Akasaka |
Fujisan Tokkyū: Does not stop at this station
Fuji Tozan Densha: Does not stop at this station

== History ==
Kasei Station opened on 19 June 1929.

== Passenger statistics ==
In fiscal 1998, the station was used by an average of 737 passengers daily.

== Surrounding area ==
- Mount Takagawa
- Kasei No. 1 Elementary School

== See also ==
- List of railway stations in Japan
