= Kotobuki Station =

Railway station in Fujiyoshida, Yamanashi Prefecture, Japan

Kotobuki Station 寿駅
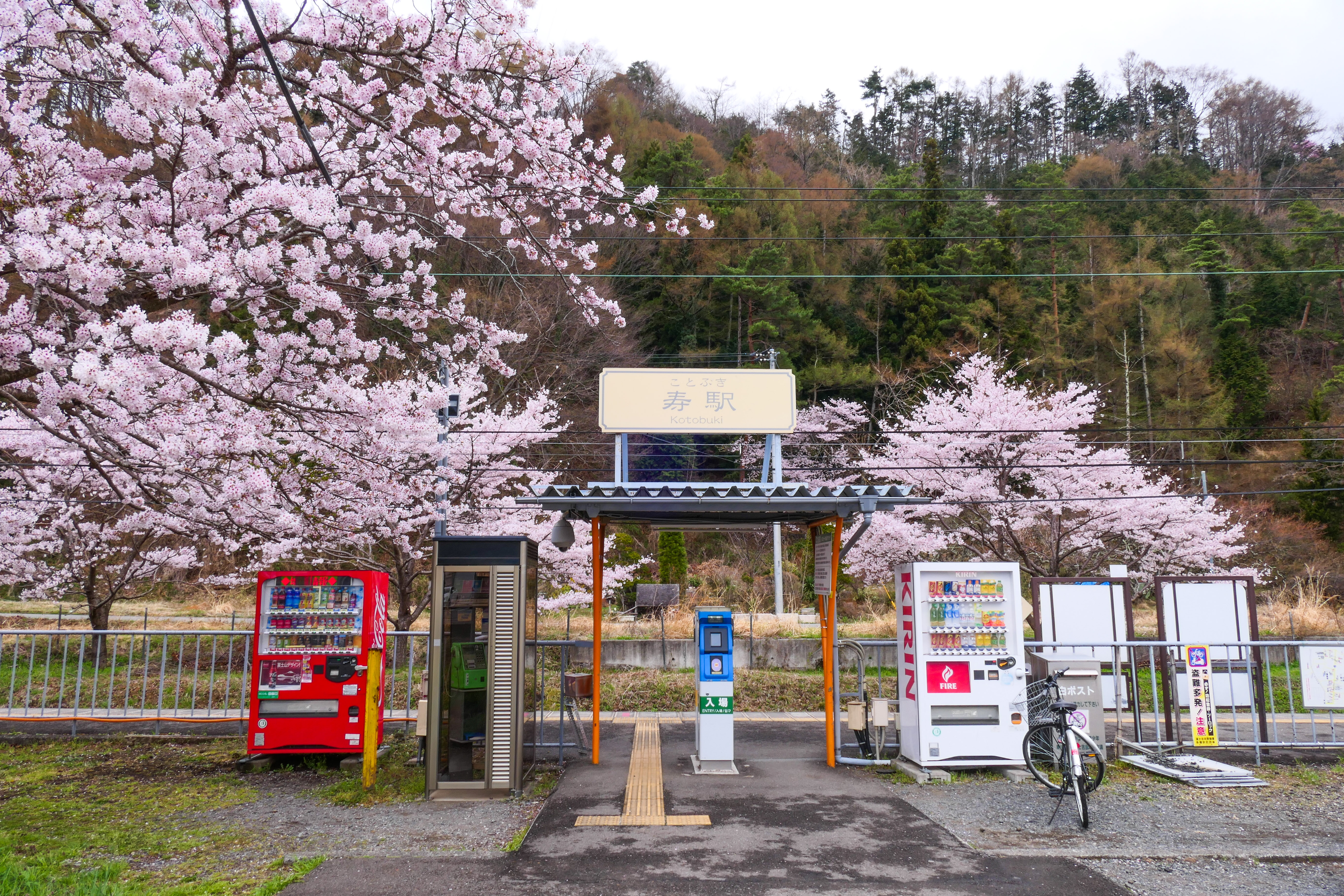
- Kotobuki Station entrance in April 2021

General information
- Location: 2930–2 Kamikurechi, Fujiyoshida-shi, Yamanashi-ken; Japan
- Coordinates: 35°30′30″N 138°49′31″E
- Elevation: 710 m (2,330 ft)
- Operator: Fuji Kyuko
- Line: ■ Fujikyuko Line
- Distance: 18.8 km from Ōtsuki
- Platforms: 1 side platform
- Tracks: 1

Other information
- Status: Unstaffed
- Station code: FJ12
- Website: Official website

History
- Opened: 19 June 1929
- Former names: Kurechi (until 1930)

Passengers
- FY1998: 518 daily
Location
- Location within Yamanashi Prefecture Location within Japan

Kotobuki Station (寿駅, Kotobuki-eki) is a railway station on the Fujikyuko Line in the city of Fujiyoshida, Yamanashi, Japan, operated by the private railway operator Fuji Kyuko (Fujikyu).

== Lines ==
Kotobuki Station is served by the 26.6 km (16.5 mi) privately operated Fujikyuko Line from Ōtsuki to Kawaguchiko, and is 18.8 kilometres (11.7 mi) from the terminus of the line at Ōtsuki Station.

== Station layout ==
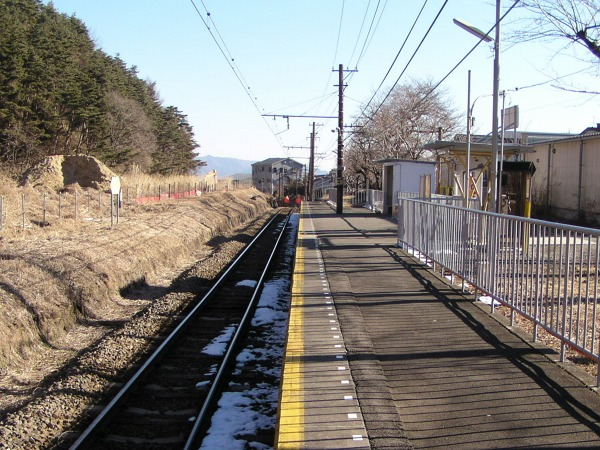
View of the platform and track looking east in February 2006

The station is unstaffed, and consists of one side platform serving a single bidirectional track, with the station structure located on the south side of the track. It has a waiting room but no toilet facilities.

== Adjacent stations ==
«	Service	»
Fujikyuko Line
Mitsutōge	Local	Yoshiikeonsenmae
Fujisan Tokkyū: Does not stop at this station
Fuji Tozan Densha: Does not stop at this station

== History ==
Kotobuki Station opened on 19 June 1929, initially named Kurechi Station (暮地駅). It was renamed on 11 June 1930 due to the name's similar appearance to bochi (墓地), the Japanese word for "graveyard".

== Passenger statistics ==
In fiscal 1998, the station was used by an average of 518 passengers daily.

== Surrounding area ==
- National Route 139
- Fujimidai Junior High School
- Fuji Elementary School
- Chūō Expressway

== Future Development ==
In order to strengthen the transport capacity and ensure flexibility in the timetable of the Fujikyu Railway Line, construction of new train passing facilities at this station began on February 2, 2026, with completion scheduled for December 2027 and an increase in train services planned for the timetable revision in March 2028. Upon completion, the station will have two platforms and two tracks, with the two platforms connected by a level crossing within the station premises.

== See also ==
- List of railway stations in Japan
