= Higashikatsura Station =

Railway station in Tsuru, Yamanashi Prefecture, Japan

Higashikatsura Station 東桂駅
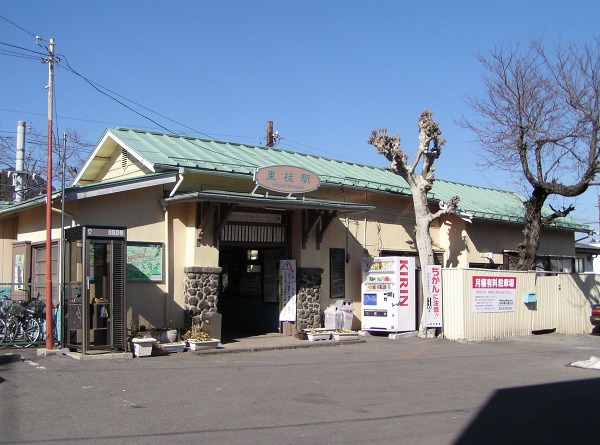
- Higashikatsura Station, February 2006

General information
- Location: 1380 Katsura-machi, Tsuru-shi, Yamanashi-ken; Japan
- Coordinates: 35°32′11″N 138°52′16″E
- Elevation: 561 m (1,841 ft)
- Operator: Fuji Kyuko
- Line: ■ Fujikyuko Line
- Distance: 13.1 km from Ōtsuki
- Platforms: 2 side platforms
- Tracks: 2

Other information
- Status: Staffed
- Station code: FJ10
- Website: Official website

History
- Opened: 19 June 1929

Passengers
- FY2013: 506 daily
Location
- Location within Yamanashi Prefecture Location within Japan

Higashikatsura Station (東桂駅, Higashkatsura-eki) is a railway station on the Fujikyuko Line in the city of Tsuru, Yamanashi, Japan, operated by Fuji Kyuko (Fujikyu).

== Lines ==
Higashikatsura Station is served by the 26.6 km (16.5 mi) privately operated Fujikyuko Line from Ōtsuki to Kawaguchiko, and is 13.1 kilometres (8.1 mi) from the terminus of the line at Ōtsuki Station.

== Station layout ==
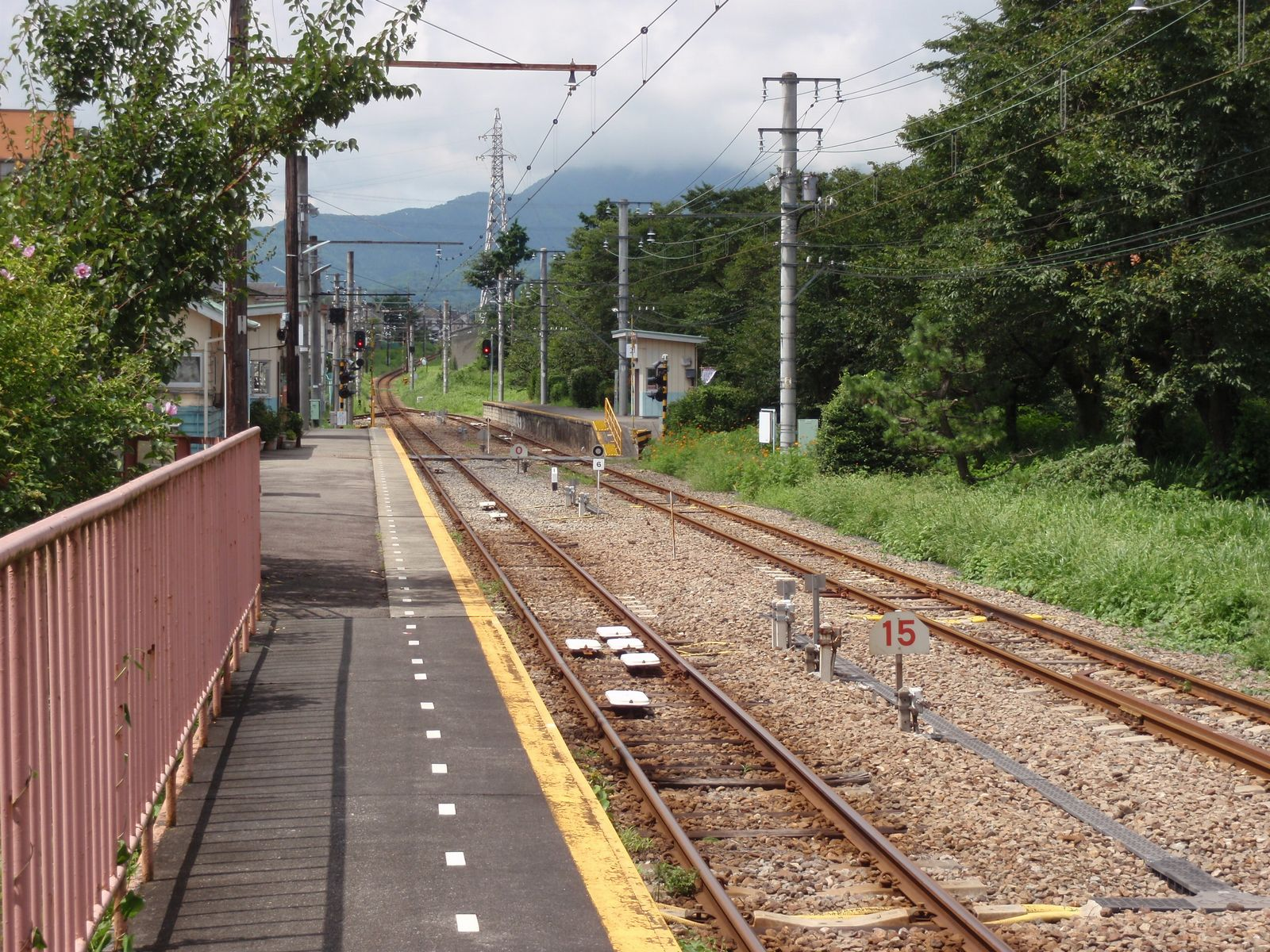
View of the platforms, August 2009

The station is staffed and consists of two staggered side platforms serving two tracks, with the station building located on the south (down) side of the tracks. Passengers cross the tracks between the platforms via a level crossing. It has waiting rooms and toilet facilities.

=== Platforms ===
1	■ Fujikyuko Line	for Ōtsuki
2	■ Fujikyuko Line	for Fujisan and Kawaguchiko

== Adjacent stations ==
«	Service	»
Fujikyuko Line
Tōkaichiba	Local	Mitsutōge
Fujisan Tokkyū: Does not stop at this station
Fuji Tozan Densha: Does not stop at this station

== History ==
Higashikatsura Station opened on 19 June 1929.

== Passenger statistics ==
In fiscal 1998, the station was used by an average of 759 passengers daily.

== Surrounding area ==
- Shishidome Power Station
- Sun Park Tsuru grass ski slope
- Chūō Expressway
- National Route 139

== See also ==
- List of railway stations in Japan
