= Tsurushi Station =

Railway station in Tsuru, Yamanashi Prefecture, Japan

Tsurushi Station 都留市駅
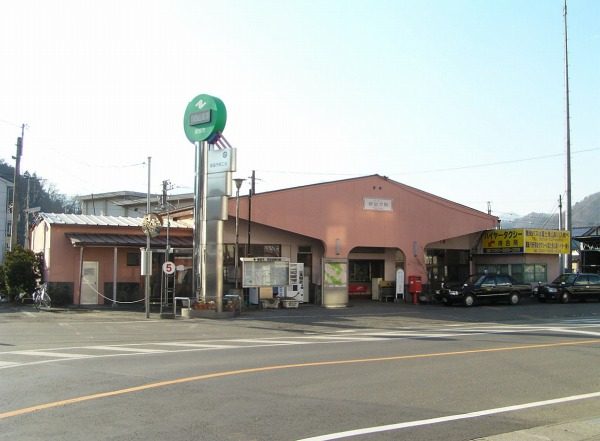
- Tsurushi Station February 2006

General information
- Location: 1-12-1 Tsuru, Tsuru, Yamanashi （山梨県都留市つる1-12-1） Japan
- Coordinates: 35°33′25″N 138°54′28″E
- Elevation: 467 m (1,532 ft)
- Operator: Fuji Kyuko
- Line: ■ Fujikyuko Line
- Distance: 8.6 km from Ōtsuki
- Platforms: 1 island platform
- Tracks: 2

Other information
- Status: Staffed
- Station code: FJ06
- Website: Official website

History
- Opened: 19 June 1929
- Former names: Yamura-yokochō (until 1965)

Passengers
- FY2017: 483 daily
Location
- Location within Yamanashi Prefecture Location within Japan

Tsurushi Station (都留市駅, Tsurushi-eki) is a railway station on the Fujikyuko Line in the city of Tsuru, Yamanashi, Japan, operated by Fuji Kyuko (Fujikyu). The station is at an altitude of 467 metres.

== Lines ==
Tsurushi Station is served by the 26.6 km (16.5 mi) privately operated Fujikyuko Line from Ōtsuki to Kawaguchiko, and lies 8.6 kilometres (5.3 mi) from the terminus of the line at Ōtsuki Station.

== Station layout ==
The station is staffed and consists of an island platform serving two tracks, with the station building located on the east (down) side of the tracks. Passengers cross the track to the platform via a level crossing. It has a waiting room and toilet facilities.

=== Platforms ===
| 1 | ■ Fujikyuko Line | for Fujisan and Kawaguchiko |
| 2 | ■ Fujikyuko Line | for Ōtsuki |

== Adjacent stations ==
| « | Service | » |
Fujikyuko Line
| Akasaka | Local | Yamuramachi |
Fujisan Tokkyū: Does not stop at this station

== History ==
Tsurushi Station opened on 19 June 1929, initially named Yamura-yokochō Station (谷村横町駅). It was renamed Tsurushi on 1 March 1965.

== Passenger statistics ==
In fiscal 1998, the station was used by an average of 831 passengers daily.

== Surrounding area ==
- Yamura Hydroelectric Power Station (the second oldest hydroelectric power station in Japan)

== See also ==
- List of railway stations in Japan
