= Yoshiike-Onsenmae Station =

Railway station in Fujiyoshida, Yamanashi Prefecture, Japan

Yoshiikeonsenmae Station 葭池温泉前駅
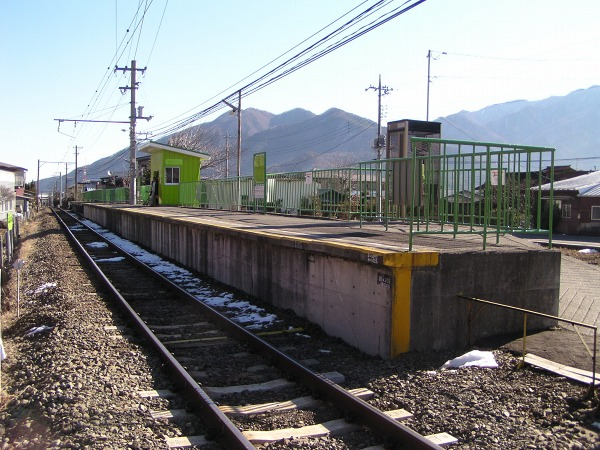
- Yoshiikeonsenmae Station looking east, February 2006

General information
- Location: 6659-4 Shimoyoshida, Fujiyoshida-shi, Yamanashi-ken 403–0004; Japan
- Coordinates: 35°30′07″N 138°48′43″E
- Elevation: 739 m (2,425 ft)
- Operator: Fuji Kyuko
- Line: ■ Fujikyuko Line
- Distance: 20.2 km from Ōtsuki
- Platforms: 1 side platform
- Tracks: 1

Other information
- Status: Unstaffed
- Station code: FJ13
- Website: Official website

History
- Opened: 19 June 1930
- Former names: Odare Kosenmae (to 1939)

Passengers
- FY1998: 173 daily
Location
- Location within Yamanashi Prefecture Location within Japan

Yoshiikeonsenmae Station (葭池温泉前駅, Yoshiikeonsenmae-eki) is a railway station on the Fujikyuko Line in the city of Fujiyoshida, Yamanashi, Japan, operated by Fuji Kyuko (Fujikyu). The station is at an altitude of 739 meters.

== Lines ==
Yoshiikeonsenmae Station is served by the 26.6 km (16.5 mi) privately operated Fujikyuko Line from Ōtsuki to Kawaguchiko, and is 20.2 kilometres (12.6 mi) from the terminus of the line at Ōtsuki Station.

== Station layout ==
The station is unstaffed, and consists of one side platform serving a single bidirectional track, with the station structure located on the south side of the track. It has a waiting room but no toilet facilities.

== Adjacent stations ==
«	Service	»
Fujikyuko Line
Kotobuki	Local	Shimoyoshida
Fujisan Tokkyū: Does not stop at this station
Fuji Tozan Densha: Does not stop at this station

== History ==
The station opened on 19 June 1930 as Odare Kosenmae Station (尾垂鉱泉前駅), and was renamed to its present name in 1939.

== Passenger statistics ==
In fiscal 1998, the station was used by an average of 173 passengers daily.

== Surrounding area ==
- Yoshinoike Onsen (hot spring after which the station is named)
- Chūō Expressway
