= Tsurubunkadaigakumae Station =

Railway station in Tsuru, Yamanashi Prefecture, Japan

Tsurubunkadaigakumae Station 都留文科大学前駅
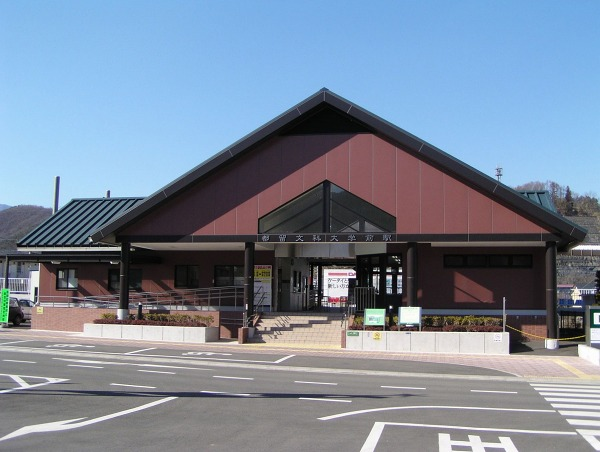
- Tsurubunkadaigakumae Station, February 2006

General information
- Location: 2–654 Tahara, Tsuru-shi, Yamanashi-ken; Japan
- Coordinates: 35°32′33″N 138°53′47″E
- Elevation: 503 m (1,650 ft)
- Operator: Fuji Kyuko
- Line: ■ Fujikyuko Line
- Distance: 10.6 km from Ōtsuki
- Platforms: 1 side platform
- Tracks: 1

Other information
- Status: Staffed
- Station code: FJ08
- Website: Official website

History
- Opened: 16 November 2004

Passengers
- FY2017: 1700 daily
Location
- Location within Yamanashi Prefecture Location within Japan

Tsurubunkadaigakumae Station (都留文科大学前駅, Tsurubunkadaigakumae-eki) is a railway station on the Fujikyuko Line in the city of Tsuru, Yamanashi, Japan, operated by Fuji Kyuko (Fujikyu).

== Lines ==
Tsurubunkadaigakumae Station is served by the 26.6 km (16.5 mi) privately operated Fujikyuko Line from Ōtsuki to Kawaguchiko, and lies 10.6 kilometres (6.6 mi) from the terminus of the line at Ōtsuki Station.

== Station layout ==
The station is staffed and consists of a single side platform serving a single bidirectional track, with the station building located on the south side of the track. It has a waiting room and toilet facilities.

== Adjacent stations ==
«	Service	»
Fujikyuko Line
Ōtsuki	Fuji Excursion	Shimoyoshida
Ōtsuki	Fujisan Tokkyū	Shimoyoshida
Yamuramachi	Local	Tōkaichiba

== History ==
Tsurubunkadaigakumae Station opened on 16 November 2004.

== Surrounding area ==
- Tsuru University (after which the station is named)
- Tsuru Municipal Athletic Park
- Uguisu Hall
- National Route 139
