= Tōkaichiba Station (Yamanashi) =

Railway station in Tsuru, Yamanashi Prefecture, Japan

Tōkaichiba Station 十日市場駅
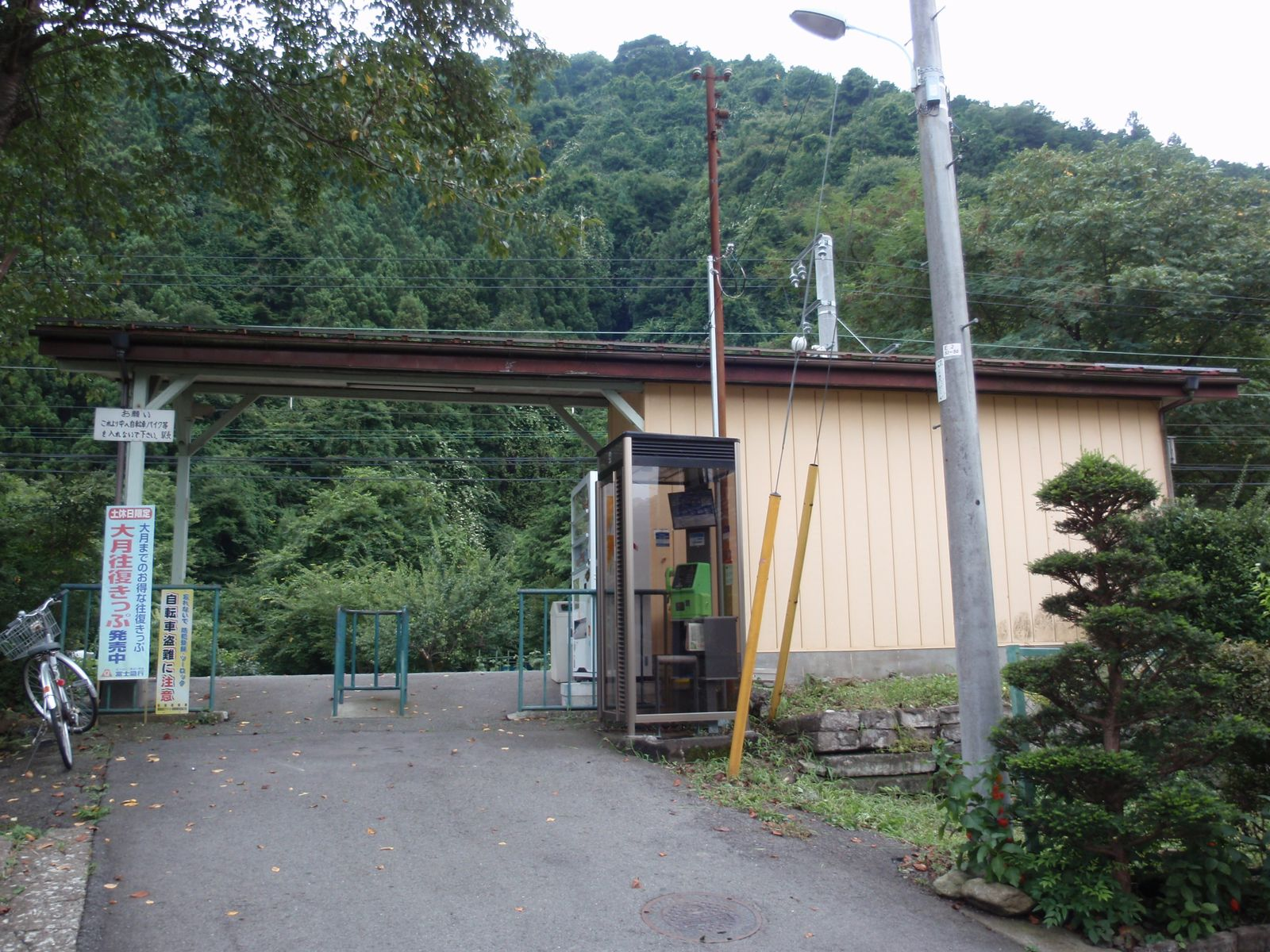
- Tōkaichiba Station, August 2009

General information
- Location: 769–3 Tōkaichiba, Tsuru-shi, Yamanashi-ken; Japan
- Coordinates: 35°32′20″N 138°53′15″E
- Elevation: 520 m (1,710 ft)
- Operator: Fuji Kyuko
- Line: ■ Fujikyuko Line
- Distance: 11.5 km from Ōtsuki
- Platforms: 1 side platform
- Tracks: 1

Other information
- Status: Unstaffed
- Station code: F09
- Website: Official website

History
- Opened: 19 June 1929

Passengers
- FY2013: 123 daily
Location
- Location within Yamanashi Prefecture Location within Japan

Tōkaichiba Station (十日市場駅, Tōkaichiba-eki) is a railway station on the Fujikyuko Line in the city of Tsuru, Yamanashi, Japan, operated by Fuji Kyuko (Fujikyu).

== Lines ==
Tōkaichiba Station is served by the 26.6 km (16.5 mi) privately operated Fujikyuko Line from Ōtsuki to Kawaguchiko, and is 11.5 kilometres (7.1 mi) from the terminus of the line at Ōtsuki Station.

== Station layout ==
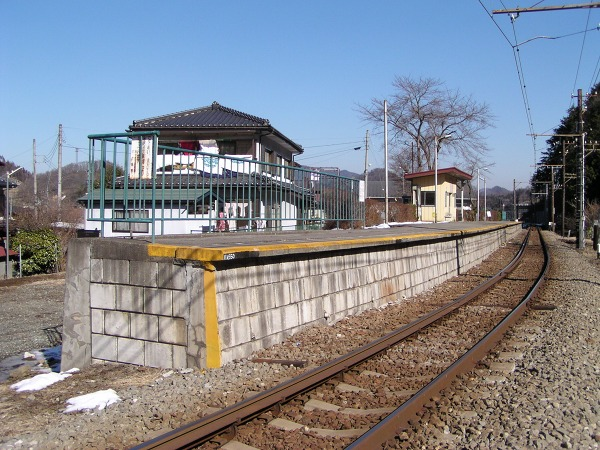
View of the platform and track looking east, February 2006

The station is unstaffed, and consists of a single side platform serving a single bidirectional track, with the station structure located on the north side of the track. It has a waiting room but no toilet facilities.

== Adjacent stations ==
«	Service	»
Fujikyuko Line
Tsurubunkadaigakumae	Local	Higashikatsura
Fujisan Tokkyū: Does not stop at this station
Fuji Tozan Densha: Does not stop at this station

== History ==
Tōkaichiba Station opened on 19 June 1929.

== Passenger statistics ==
In fiscal 1998, the station was used by an average of 319 passengers daily.

== Surrounding area ==
- Tahara Falls
- National Route 139

== See also ==
- List of railway stations in Japan
