= Tsuru, Yamanashi =

Tsuru 都留市
- City
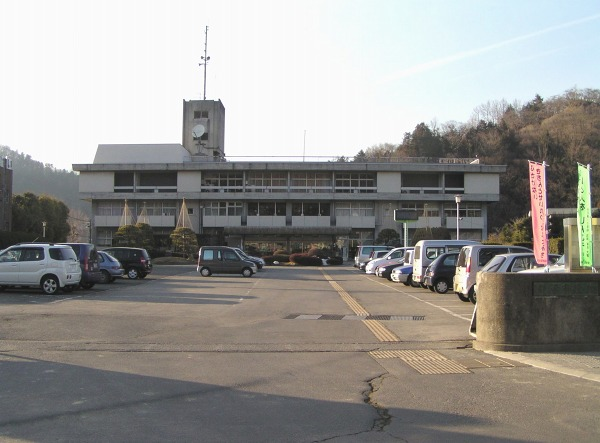
- Tsuru City Hall

- Flag Seal

- Location of Tsuru in Yamanashi Prefecture

- Coordinates: 35°33′5.5″N 138°54′19.6″E
- Country: Japan
- Region: Chūbu (Tōkai)
- Prefecture: Yamanashi Prefecture
- Tanimura town settled: March 7, 1896
- City settled and current name changed: April 29, 1954

Government
  - Mayor: Yoshinori Hinata (日向美徳) - from December 2025

Area
  - Total: 161.63 km^{2} (62.41 sq mi)

Population (May 31, 2019)
  - Total: 30,311
  - Density: 187.53/km^{2} (485.71/sq mi)
- Time zone: UTC+9 (Japan Standard Time)
- Tree: Pinus
- Flower: Prunus mume
- -Bird: Cettia diphone
- Phone number: 0554-43-1111
- Address: Kamiya 1-1-1, Tsuru City, Yamanashi Prefecture 402-8501
- Website: Official website

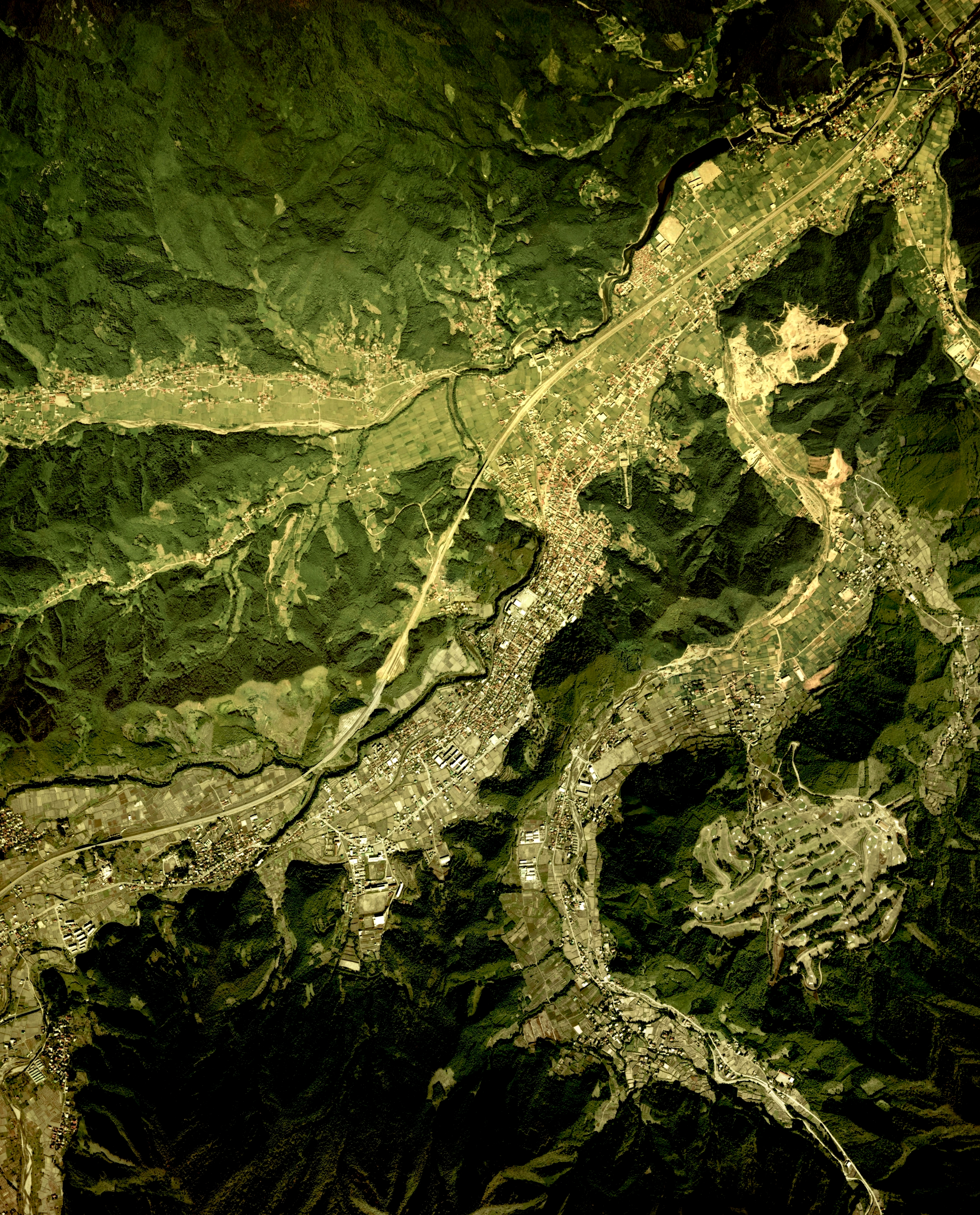
Tsuru city center area

Tsuru (都留市, Tsuru-shi) is a city located in Yamanashi Prefecture, Japan. As of 1 May 2019, the city had an estimated population of 30,311 in 13079 households, and a population density of 190 persons per km^{2}. The total area of the city is 161.63 square kilometres (62.41 sq mi).

== Geography ==
Tsuru is located in southeastern Yamanashi Prefecture, in the foothills of Mount Fuji. It is bordered on the south by the Tanzawa Mountains. The Sagami River, known locally as the Katsura River, flows through the city.

=== Neighboring municipalities ===
Yamanashi Prefecture

- Fujiyoshida
- Ōtsuki
- Uenohara
- Minamitsuru District - Yamanakako, Oshino, Nishikatsura, Fujikawaguchiko

=== Climate ===
The city has a climate characterized by characterized by hot and humid summers, and relatively mild winters (Köppen climate classification Cfb). The average annual temperature in Tsuru is 12.3 °C. The average annual rainfall is 1610 mm with September as the wettest month. The temperatures are highest on average in August, at around 24.2 °C, and lowest in January, at around 0.9 °C.

== Demographics ==
Per Japanese census data, the population of Tsuru peaked around the year 2000 and has declined since.

Historical population
Year	Pop.	±%
1940	24,158	—
1950	31,098	+28.7%
1960	29,262	−5.9%
1970	31,118	+6.3%
1980	32,901	+5.7%
1990	33,903	+3.0%
2000	35,513	+4.7%
2010	33,588	−5.4%
2020	31,016	−7.7%

== History ==
The area around Tsuru has been continuously inhabited since the Japanese Paleolithic period, and numerous artifacts from the Jōmon period and Kofun period have been found within its borders. The area has been part of ancient Tsuru County of Kai Province since the Nara period. During the Sengoku period, the area was controlled by the Takeda clan. During the Edo period, all of Kai Province was tenryō territory under direct control of the Tokugawa shogunate. During the cadastral reform of the early Meiji period on April 1, 1889, the village of Tani was created within Minamitsuru District, Yamanashi Prefecture. Tani was raised to town status on March 7, 1896. On April 29, 1954 Tani merged with four neighboring villages to form the city of Tsuru.

== Government ==
Tsuru has a mayor-council form of government with a directly elected mayor and a unicameral city legislature of 16 members.

== Education ==
- Tsuru University
- Tsuru has eight public elementary schools and three public middle schools operated by the city government and one public high school operated by the Yamanashi Prefectural Board of Education. The prefecture also operates the public Yamanashi Industrial Technology Junior College.

== Transportation ==
=== Railway ===
- Fuji Kyuko - Ōtsuki Line
  - Tanokura - Kasei - Akasaka - Tsurushi - Yamuramachi - Tsurubunkadaigakumae - Tōkaichiba - Higashikatsura

=== Highway ===
- Chūō Expressway
- National Route 139

== Sister cities ==
- Hendersonville, Tennessee, United States

== Notable people from Tsuru ==
- Kazuo Dan, novelist
- Jinpachi Nezu, actor
- Mika Yamamoto, video and photo journalist
- Yasuyo Yamasaki, Colonel in command of IJA forces at Battle of Attu
