= Mitsutōge Station =

Railway station in Nishikatsura, Yamanashi Prefecture, Japan

Mitsutōge Station 三つ峠駅
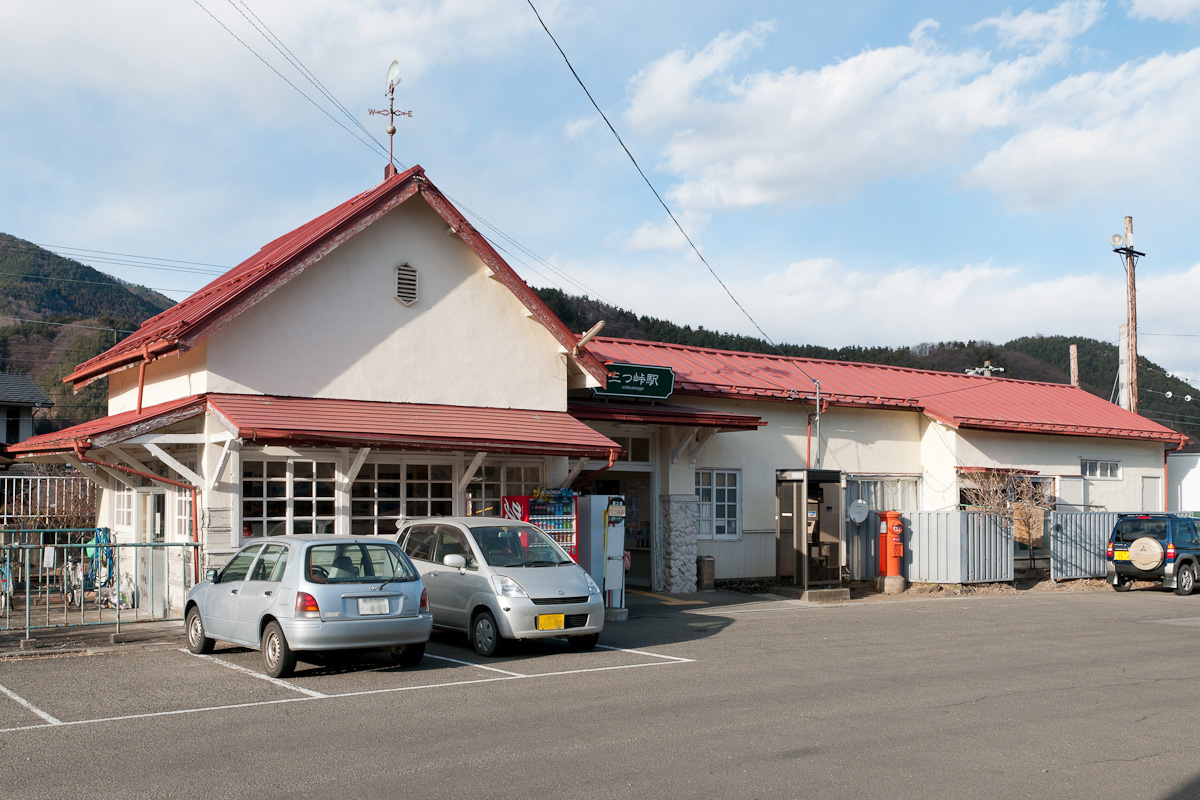
- Mitsutōge Station, January 2011

General information
- Location: 1583 Onuma, Nishikatsura-cho, Minamitsuru-gun, Yamanashi-ken; Japan
- Coordinates: 35°31′26″N 138°50′43″E
- Elevation: 616 m (2,021 ft)
- Operator: Fuji Kyuko
- Line: ■ Fujikyuko Line
- Distance: 26.6 km from Ōtsuki
- Platforms: 1 island platform

Other information
- Status: Unstaffed
- Station code: FJ11
- Website: Official website

History
- Opened: 19 June 1929
- Former names: Onuma (until 1943)

Passengers
- FY1998: 651 daily
Location
- Location within Yamanashi Prefecture Location within Japan

Mitsutōge Station (三つ峠駅, Mitsutōge-eki) is a railway station on the Fujikyuko Line in the town of Nishikatsura, Yamanashi, Japan, operated by Fuji Kyuko (Fujikyu).

== Lines ==
Mitsutōge Station is served by the 26.6 km (16.5 mi) privately operated Fujikyuko Line from Ōtsuki to Kawaguchiko, and is 15.8 kilometres (9.8 mi) from the terminus of the line at Ōtsuki Station.

== Station layout ==
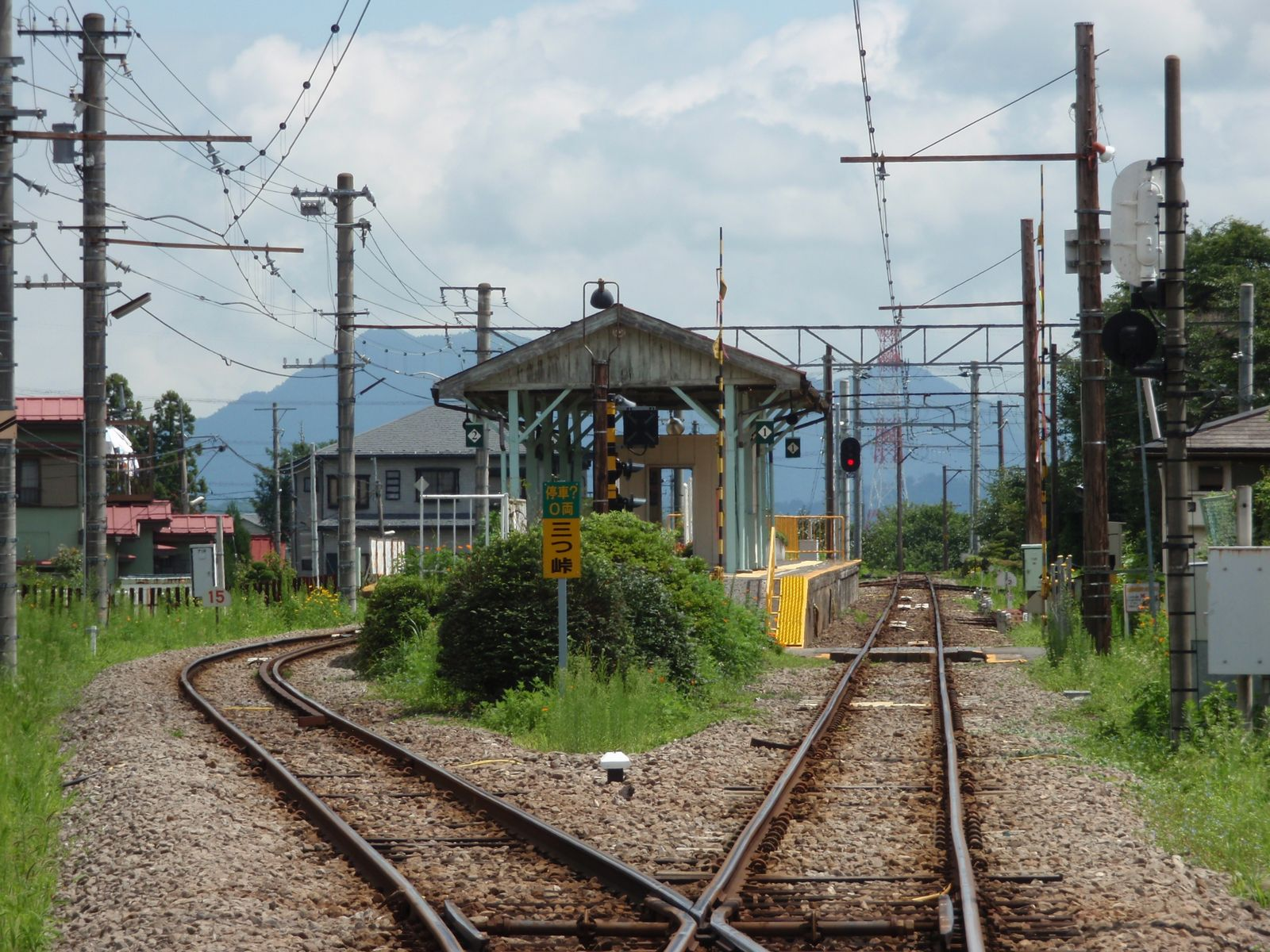
View of the platforms and tracks from the west, August 2009

The station is staffed and consists of an island platform serving two tracks, with the station building located on the south (down) side of the tracks. Passengers cross the track to the platform via a level crossing. It has a waiting room and toilet facilities. The station is attended.

=== Platforms ===
1	■ Fujikyuko Line	for Fujisan and Kawaguchiko
2	■ Fujikyuko Line	for Ōtsuki

== Adjacent stations ==
«	Service	»
Fujikyuko Line
Ōtsuki JC32	Fuji Tozan Densha	Shimoyoshida
Higashi-Katsura	Local	Kotobuki
Fujisan Tokkyū: Does not stop at this station

== History ==
Mitsutōge Station opened on 19 June 1929, initially named Onuma Station (小沼駅). It was renamed on 20 September 1943.

== Passenger statistics ==
In fiscal 1998, the station was used by an average of 651 passengers daily.

== Surrounding area ==
- Mount Mitsutōge
- Nishikatsura Junior High School
- Nishikatsura Elementary School
- Chūō Expressway
- National Route 139

== In popular media ==
The station was used as a location in the TV Asahi drama Teruteru Ashita (てるてるあした).
