= Yamuramachi Station =

Railway station in Tsuru, Yamanashi Prefecture, Japan

Yamuramachi Station 谷村町駅
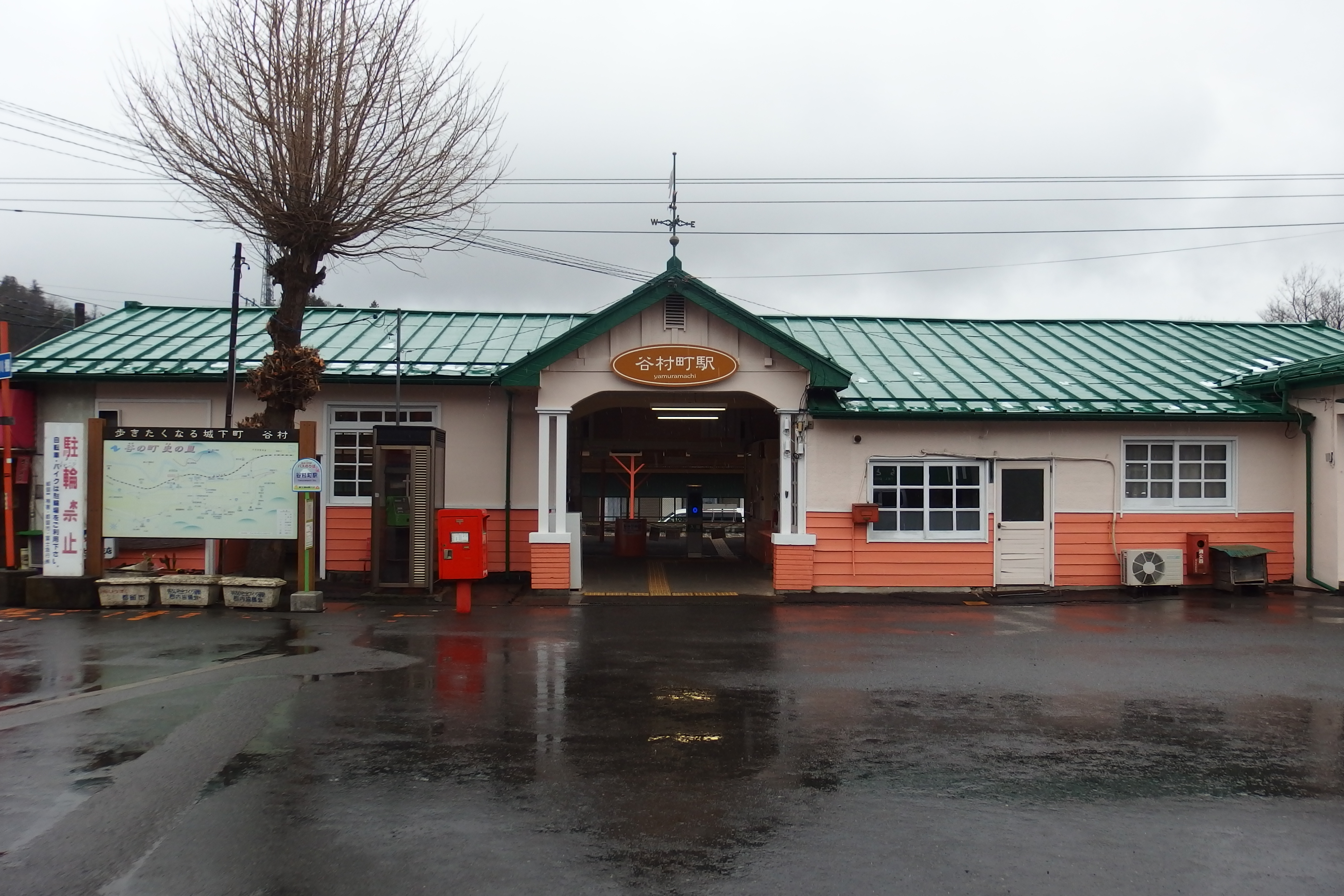
- Yamuramachi Station, March 2017

General information
- Location: 1-2-8 Kamiya, Tsuru-shi, Yamanashi-ken; Japan
- Coordinates: 35°33′02″N 138°54′17″E
- Elevation: 484 m (1,588 ft)
- Operator: Fuji Kyuko
- Line: ■ Fujikyuko Line
- Distance: 9.4 km from Ōtsuki
- Platforms: 2 side platform
- Tracks: 2

Other information
- Status: Staffed
- Station code: FJ07
- Website: Official website

History
- Opened: 19 June 1929

Passengers
- FY2015: 687 daily
Location
- Location within Yamanashi Prefecture Location within Japan

Yamuramachi Station (谷村町駅, Yamuramachi-eki) is a railway station on the Fujikyuko Line in the city of Tsuru, Yamanashi, Japan, operated by Fuji Kyuko (Fujikyu).

== Lines ==
Yamuramachi Station is served by the 26.6 km (16.5 mi) privately operated Fujikyuko Line from Ōtsuki to Kawaguchiko, and is 9.4 kilometres (5.8 mi) from the terminus of the line at Ōtsuki Station.

== Station layout ==
The station is staffed and consists of two side platforms serving two tracks, with the station building located on the east (down) side of the tracks. Passengers cross the tracks between the platforms via a level crossing. It has a waiting room and toilet facilities.

== Adjacent stations ==
«	Service	»
Fujikyuko Line
Tsurushi	Local	Tsurubunkadaigakumae
Fujisan Tokkyū: Does not stop at this station
Fuji Tozan Densha: Does not stop at this station

== History ==
Yamuramachi Station opened on 19 June 1929.

== Passenger statistics ==
In fiscal 1998, the station was used by an average of 1,428 passengers daily.

== Surrounding area ==
- Tsuru City Office
- Katsuyama Castle
- Tsuru Museum

== See also ==
- List of railway stations in Japan
