= Fujikyuko Line =

Railway line in Yamanashi prefecture, Japan

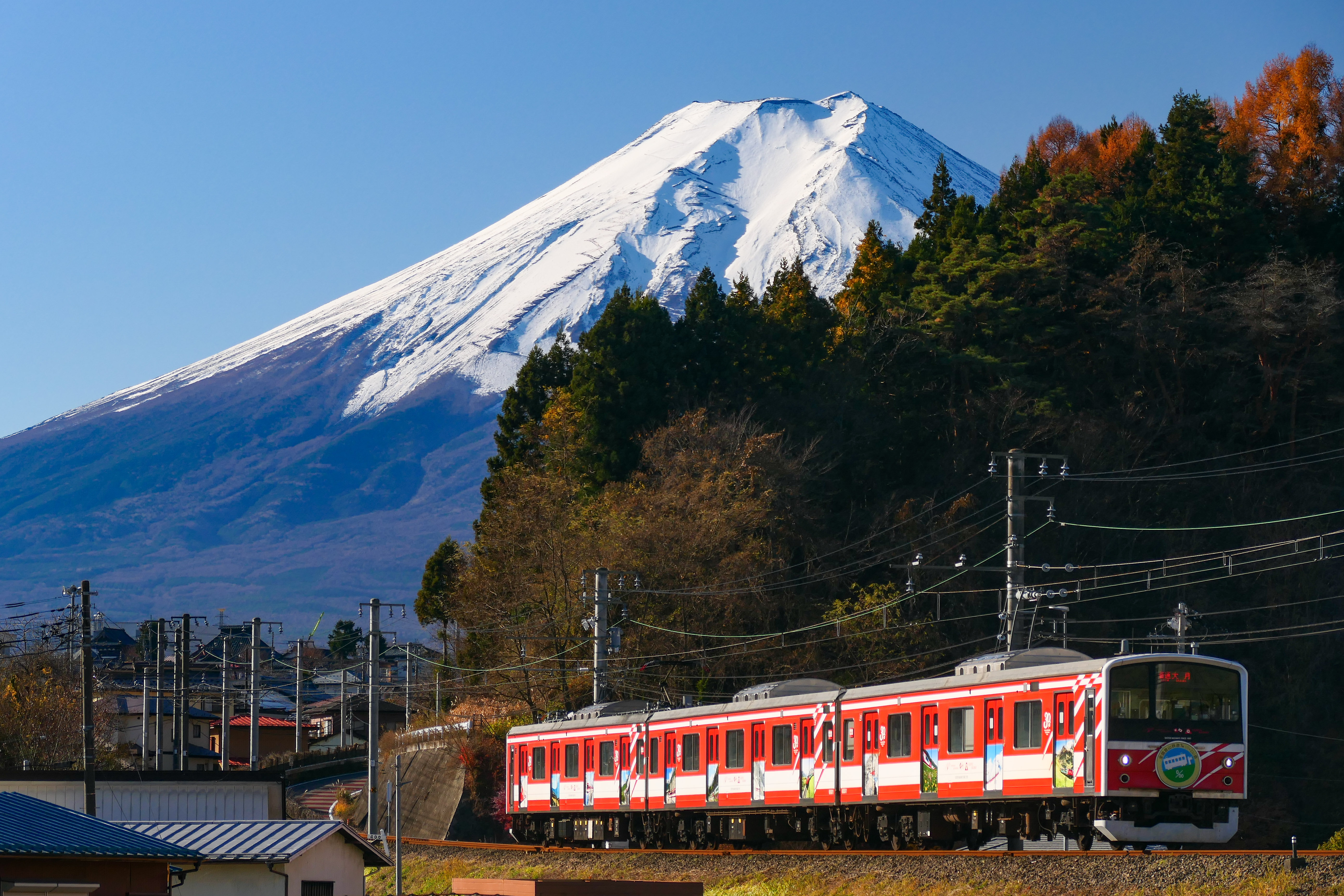
- 6000 series with Mount Fuji in the background, December 2024

Overview
- Native name: 富士急行線
- Locale: Yamanashi Prefecture
- Termini: Ōtsuki; Kawaguchiko
- Stations: 18

Service
- Type: Commuter rail
- Operator: Fuji Kyuko

History
- Opened: September 21, 1900; 126 years ago

Technical
- Line length: 26.6 km (16.5 mi)
- Track gauge: 1,067 mm (3 ft 6 in)
- Electrification: 1,500 V DC, overhead lines
Route map

The Fujikyuko Line (富士急行線, Fuji-Kyūkō-sen) is a Japanese private railway line in Yamanashi Prefecture, between Ōtsuki Station in Ōtsuki and Kawaguchiko Station in Fujikawaguchiko. It is the only railway line operated by Fuji Kyuko.

The railway line officially consists of the Ōtsuki Line (大月線, Ōtsuki-sen) and Kawaguchiko Line (河口湖線, Kawaguchiko-sen), but the two lines are operated as one. The line can be traced back to the Tsuru Horse-drawn Tramway (都留馬車鉄道) which began operation in 1900.

== Service outline ==
Local trains (which stop at all stations) run about every 30 minutes. As well as these, several Fujisan Tokkyu (Mount Fuji express) services are operated. The line is mountainous, climbing from Otsuki (358 meters (1,175 ft) above sea level) to Kawaguchiko (857 meters (2,812 ft) above sea level): a 500-metre (1,640 ft) ascent over the 26.6-kilometre (16.5 mi) route. In many places, Mount Fuji can be seen from the train.

The Fujikyuko Line is the only railway service to access the northern Yamanashi side of Mount Fuji and Fuji Five Lakes, part of Fuji-Hakone-Izu National Park.

Fuji Kyuko railway and bus lines accept Pasmo, Suica, and other IC farecards. The railway was provided with the capability from 14 March 2015.

The Fuji Kyuko established "Fuji Sanroku Electric Railway" (Ja:富士山麓電気鉄道/ Fuji Sanroku Denki Tetsudo) in May 2021 because the company will split Fuji Kyuko railway department from 1 April 2022. And, Fujikyuko Line will surely belong to "Fuji San-Roku Denki Tetsudo" from 1 April 2022.

== Basic data ==
- Distance (Ōtsuki — Kawaguchiko): 26.6 km
  - Ōtsuki Line (Ōtsuki — Mt. Fuji): 23.6 km
  - Kawaguchiko Line (Mt. Fuji — Kawaguchiko): 3.0 km

It is a single-track railway, but there are passing loops at about half the stations. The Ōtsuki Line runs roughly SW from Ōtsuki to Mount Fuji), and the Kawaguchiko Line runs roughly NW from Mount Fuji to Kawaguchiko.

== Stations ==
- All stations are located in Yamanashi Prefecture.

Legend
O: Trains stop at this station
|: Trains do not stop at this station

Line	Station No.	Station name		Elevation (m)	Distance (km)		Limited Express	Transfers	Location
Line	Station No.	Station name		Elevation (m)	Between stations	Cumulative	Limited Express	Transfers	Location
Ōtsuki Line	FJ01	Ōtsuki	大月	358	-	0.0	O	Chūō Main Line	Ōtsuki
Ōtsuki Line	FJ02	Kamiōtsuki (some trains stop)	上大月	358	0.6	0.6	|		Ōtsuki
Ōtsuki Line	FJ03	Tanokura	田野倉	392	2.4	3.0	|		Tsuru
Ōtsuki Line	FJ04	Kasei	禾生	421	2.6	5.6	|		Tsuru
Ōtsuki Line	FJ05	Akasaka	赤坂	445	1.5	7.1	|		Tsuru
Ōtsuki Line	FJ06	Tsurushi	都留市	467	1.5	8.6	|		Tsuru
Ōtsuki Line	FJ07	Yamuramachi	谷村町	484	0.8	9.4	|		Tsuru
Ōtsuki Line	FJ08	Tsurubunkadaigakumae	都留文科大学前	503	1.2	10.6	O		Tsuru
Ōtsuki Line	FJ09	Tōkaichiba	十日市場	520	0.9	11.5	|		Tsuru
Ōtsuki Line	FJ10	Higashikatsura	東桂	561	1.6	13.1	|		Tsuru
Ōtsuki Line	FJ11	Mitsutōge	三つ峠	616	2.7	15.8	|		Nishikatsura
Ōtsuki Line	FJ12	Kotobuki	寿	710	3.0	18.8	|		Fujiyoshida
Ōtsuki Line	FJ13	Yoshiikeonsenmae	葭池温泉前	739	1.4	20.2	|		Fujiyoshida
Ōtsuki Line	FJ14	Shimoyoshida	下吉田	753	0.9	21.1	O		Fujiyoshida
Ōtsuki Line	FJ15	Gekkōji	月江寺	776	0.8	21.9	|		Fujiyoshida
Ōtsuki Line	FJ16	Mt. Fuji	富士山	809	1.7	23.6	O		Fujiyoshida
Kawaguchiko Line		Mt. Fuji	富士山	809	1.7	23.6	O		Fujiyoshida
Kawaguchiko Line	FJ17	Fujikyu-Highland	富士急ハイランド	829	1.4	25.0	O		Fujikawaguchiko
Kawaguchiko Line	FJ18	Kawaguchiko	河口湖	857	1.6	26.6	O		Fujikawaguchiko

== History ==
The Tsuru Horse-drawn Tramway opened a 762 mm (2 ft 6 in) gauge line from Tsurushi to Shimoyoshida in 1900. In 1903, the Fuji Horse-drawn Tramway opened a 610 mm (2 ft) gauge line from Otsuki to Kasei, the same year the Tsuru Horse-drawn Tramway was extended from Tsurushi to Kasei, and from Shimoyoshida to Fuji-yoshida (present-day Fujisan). In 1921, the two companies merged, converted the Otsuki to Kasei section to 762 mm gauge, and electrified the line.

On 18 September 1926, the Fuji Electric Railway (富士山麓電気鉄道) was founded, and on 19 June 1929, it started operating a new 1,067 mm (3 ft 6 in) line from Otsuki to Fuji-yoshida, electrified at 1,500 V DC overhead. The line was extended from Fuji-yoshida to Kawaguchiko, opening on 24 August 1950. The operating company was renamed Fujikyuko from 25 May 1960.

Freight services on the line were discontinued from 1 April 1978.

== Rolling stock ==
- Fujikyu 1200 series (Fuji Tozan train)
- Fujikyu 6000 series (since February 2012)
- Fujikyu 8000 series (Fujisan Limited Express services since 12 July 2014)
- Fujikyu 8500 series (Fujisan View Express services since 23 April 2016)

=== Though-service ===
- JR East E353 series (Fuji Excursion services since 16 March 2019)
- JR East E131 series
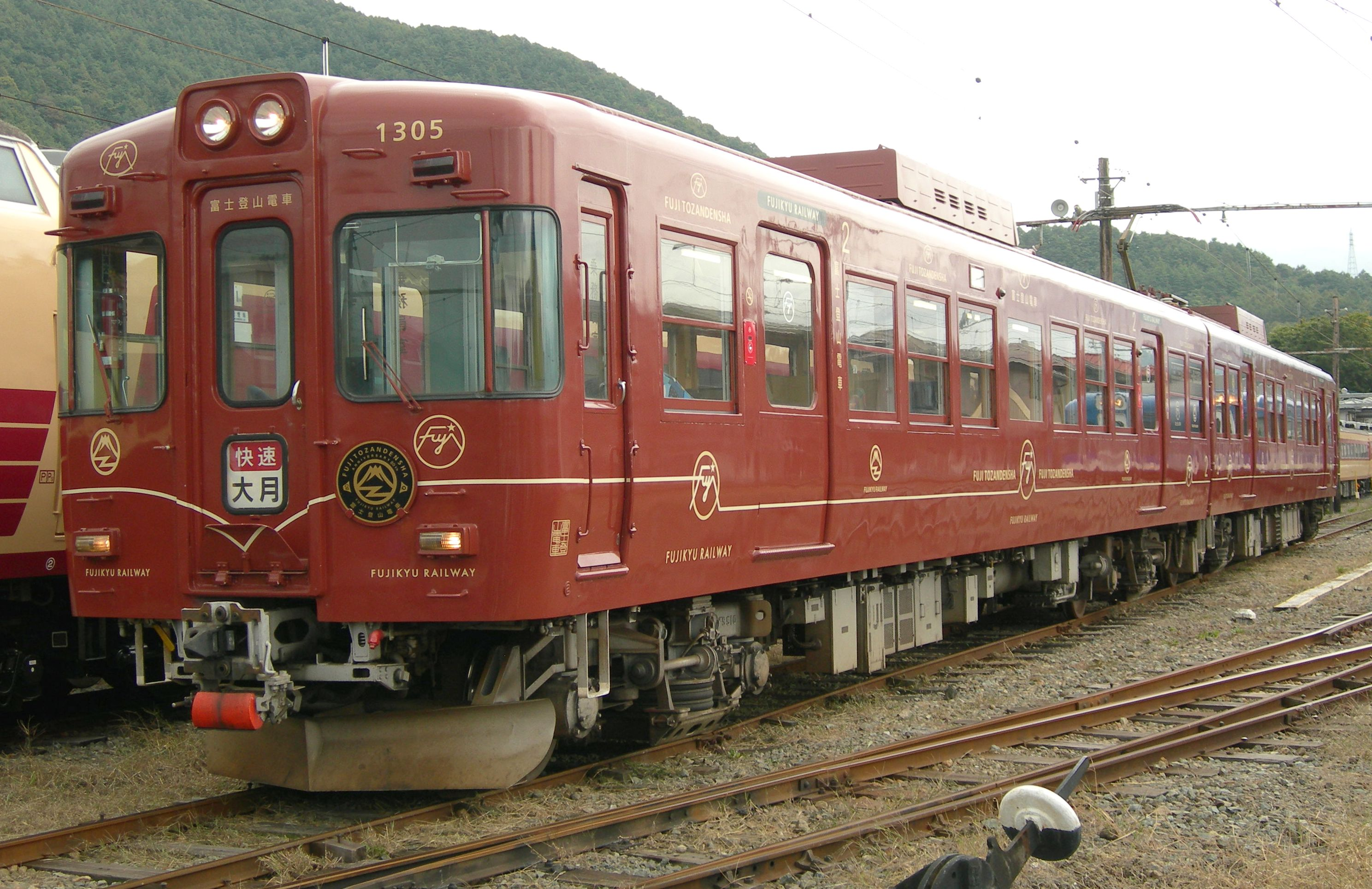
The 1200 series Fuji Tozan train in October 2010

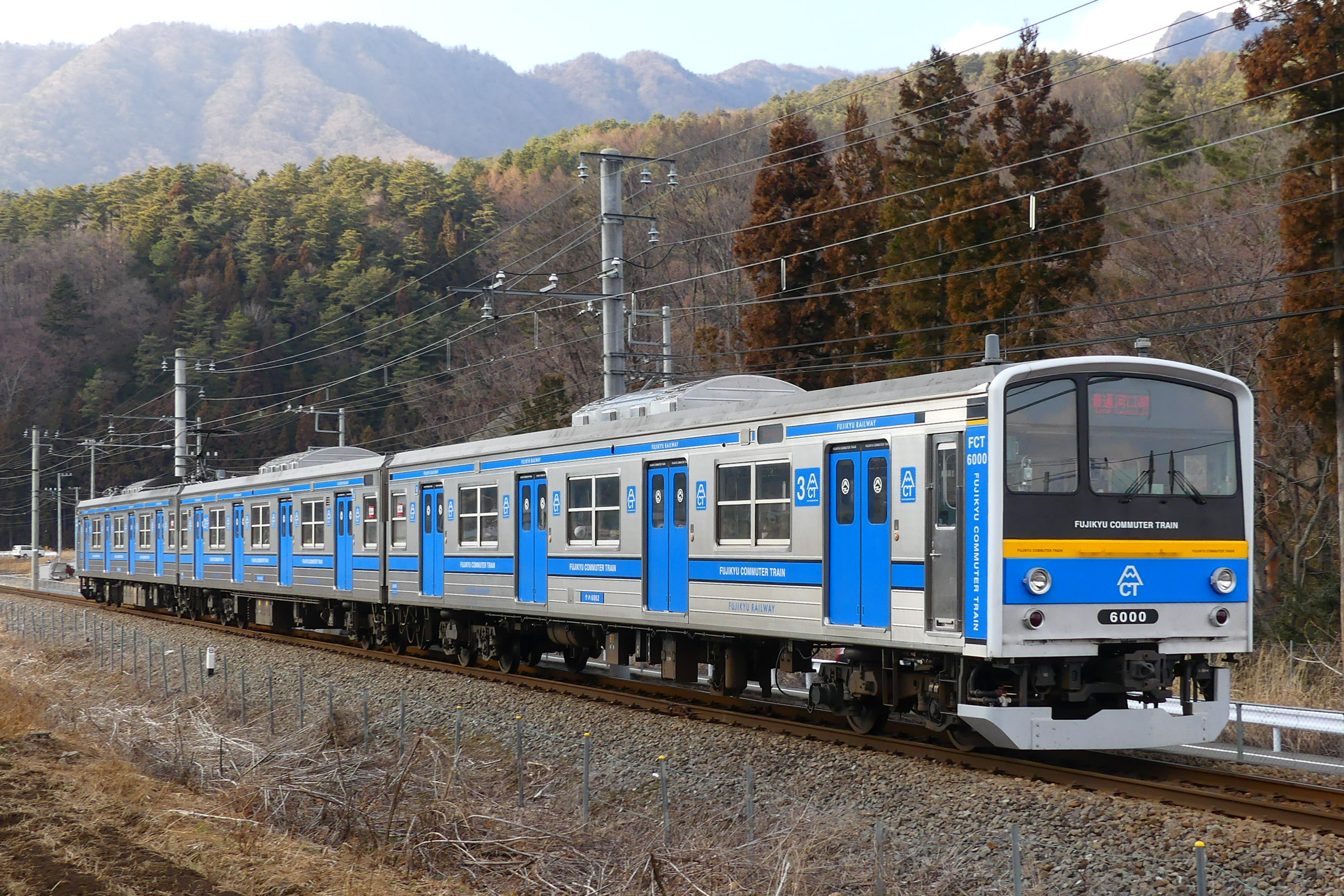
A 6000 series EMU in January 2018

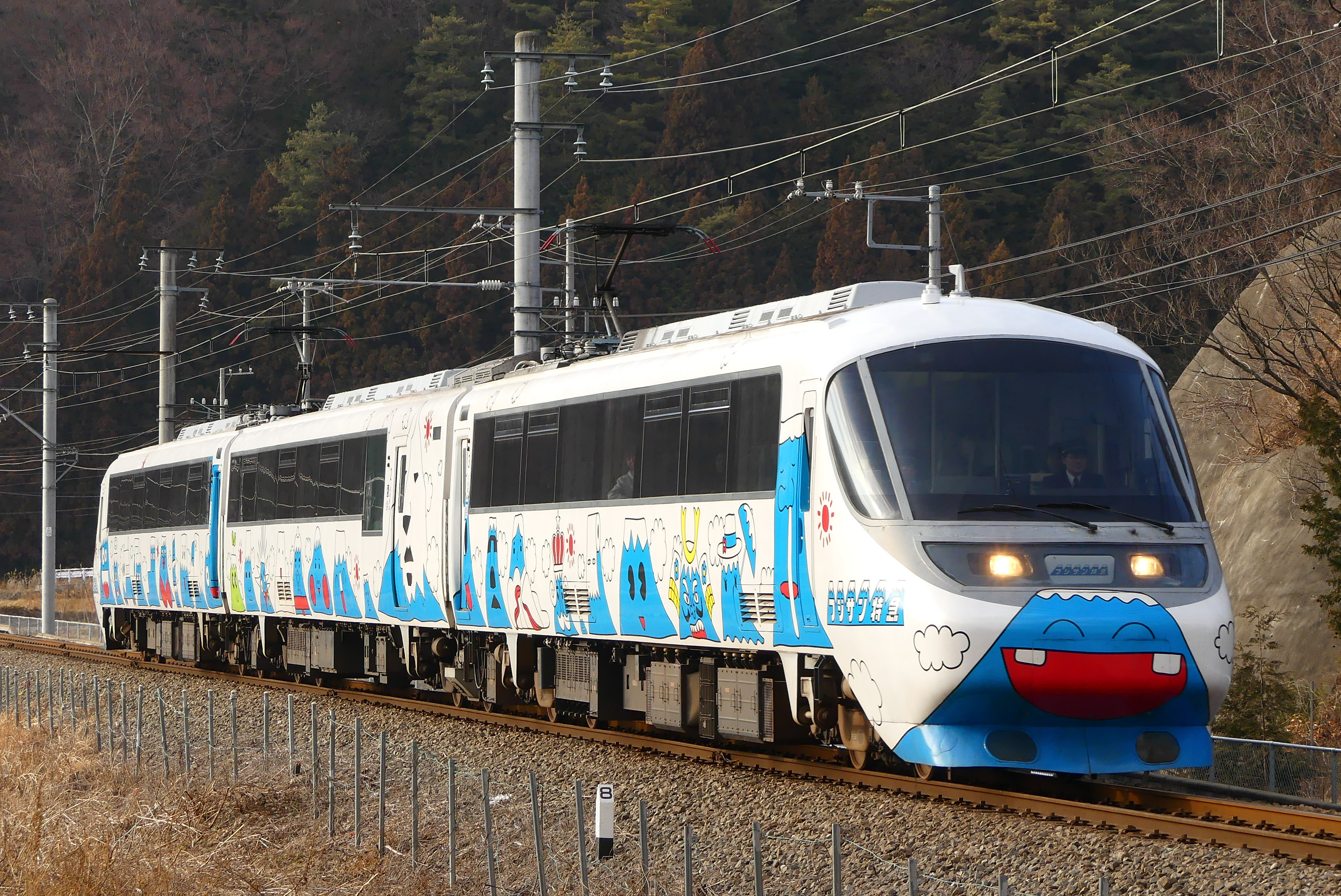
The 8000 series Fujisan Limited Express EMU in January 2018

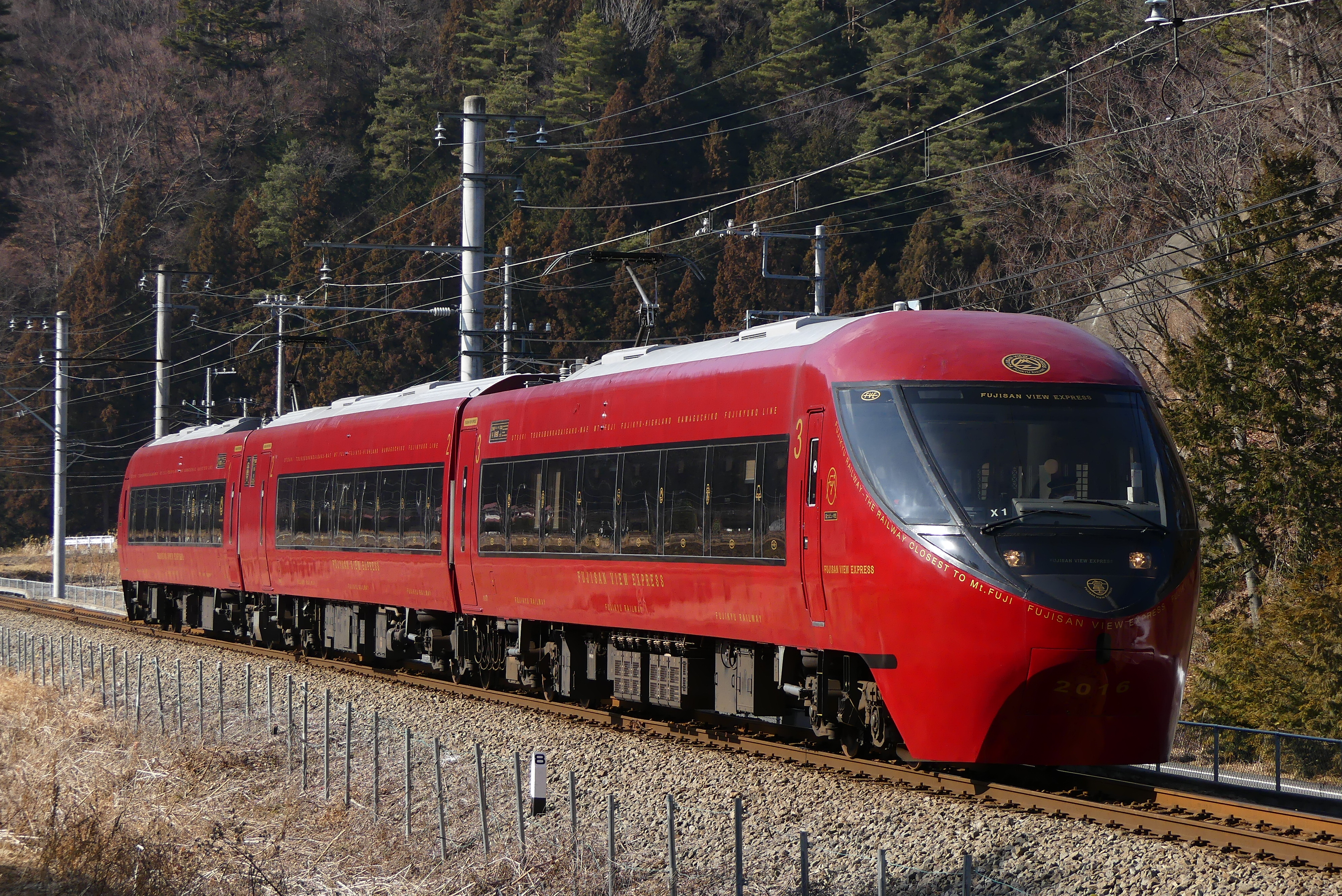
The 8500 series Fujisan View Express EMU in January 2018

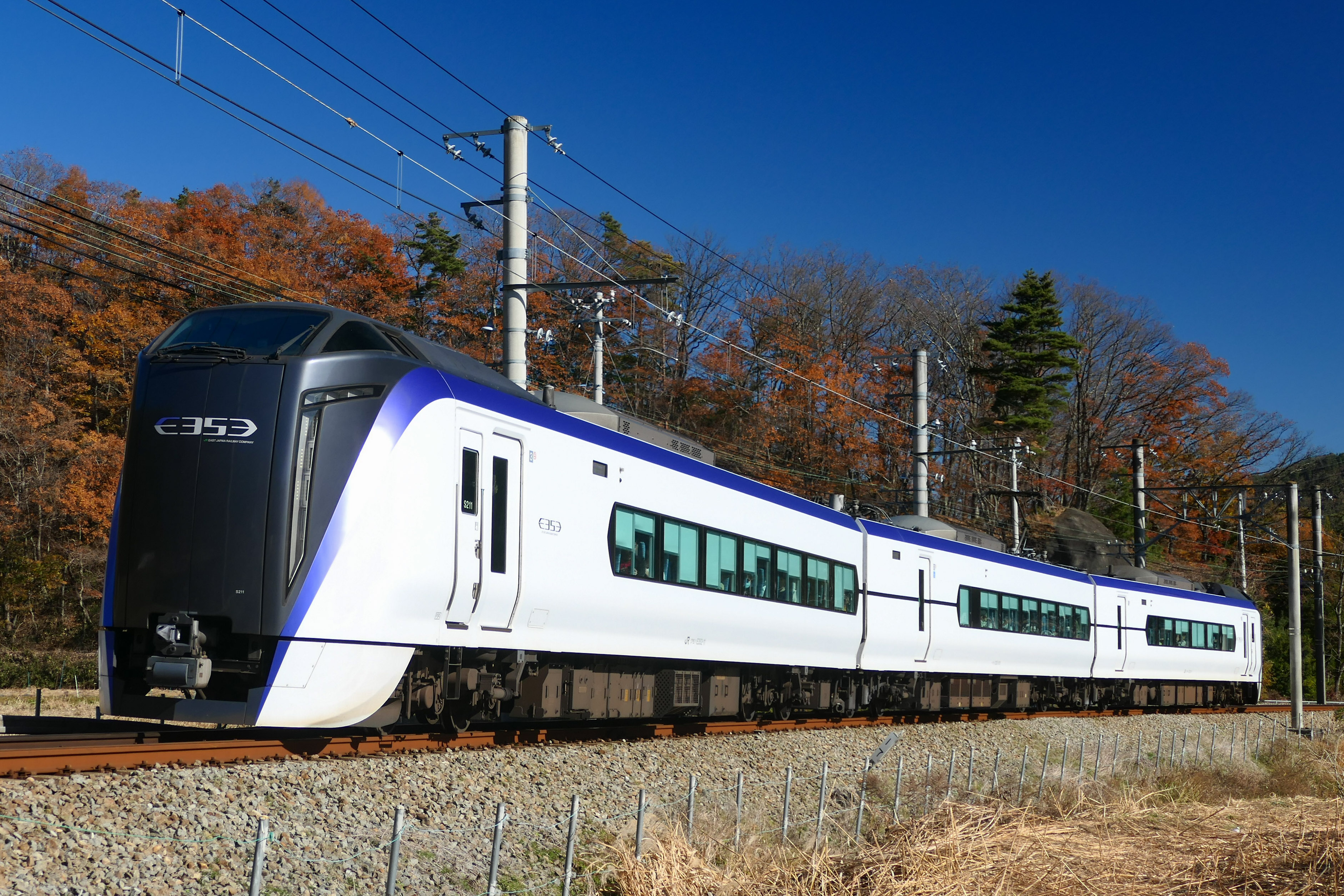
A JR East E353 series EMU on a Fuji Excursion service in December 2024

=== Former rolling stock ===
- Fujikyu 1000 series (1994 - 15 December 2024)
- Fujikyu 2000 series (Fujisan Limited Express services, February 2002 - 7 February 2016)

The last remaining 2000 series set was withdrawn after its final run on 7 February 2016.

- Fujikyu 5000 series (Thomas Land Express services, 2007 - 2019)
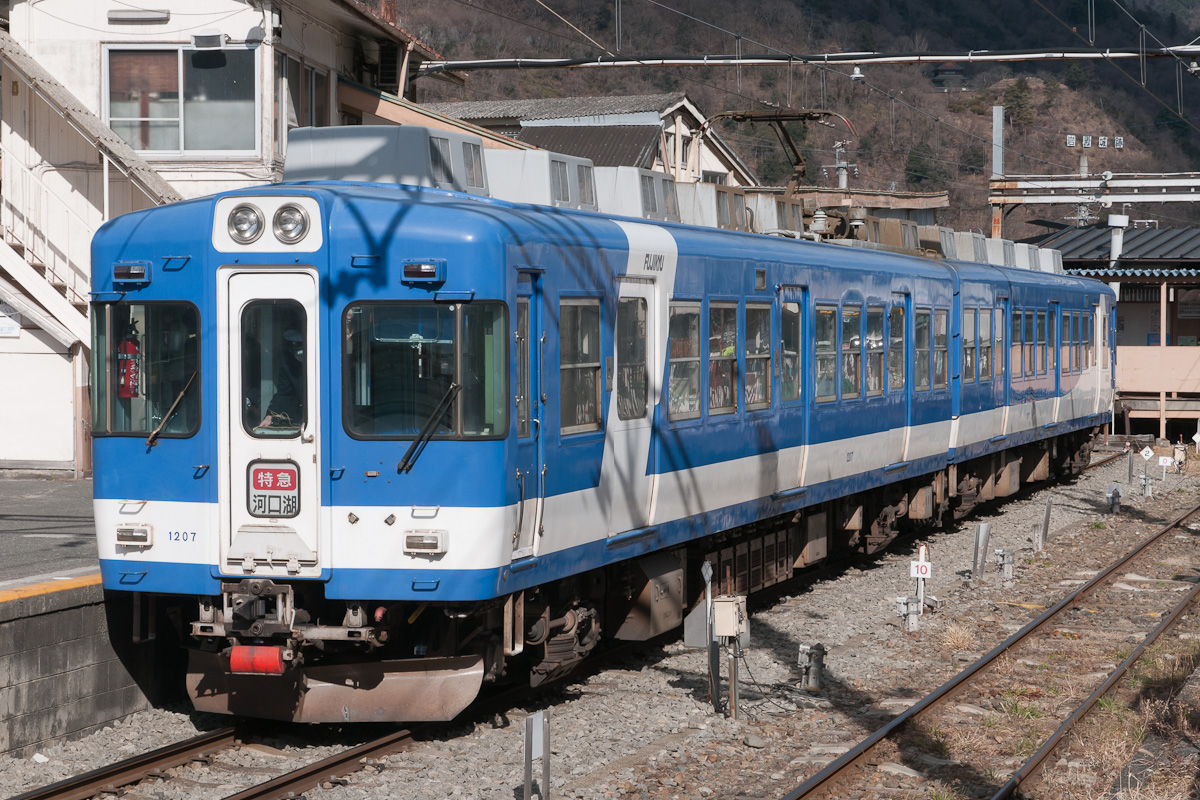
A 1000 series EMU in January 2011

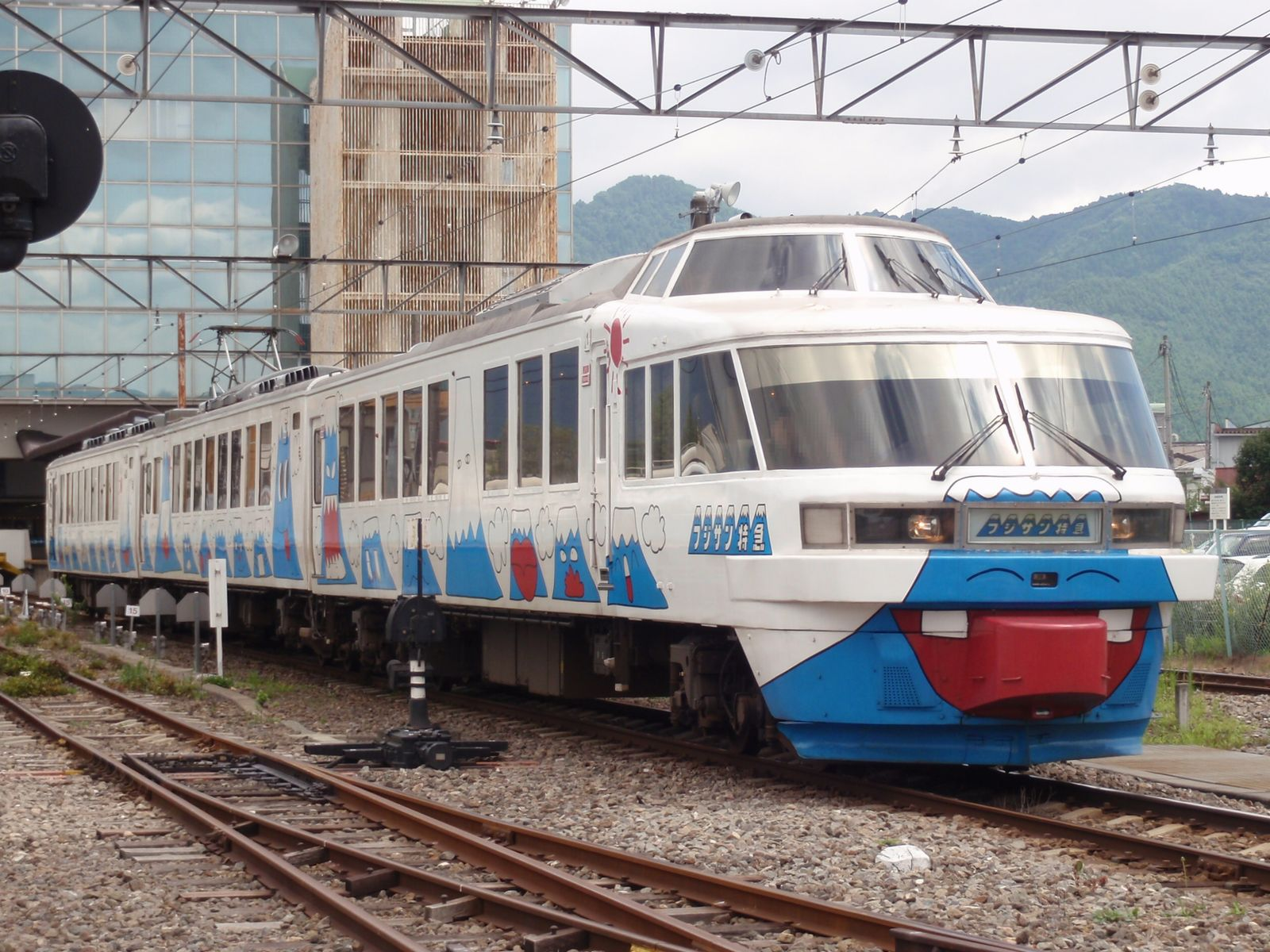
A 2000 series Fujisan Limited Express EMU in August 2009

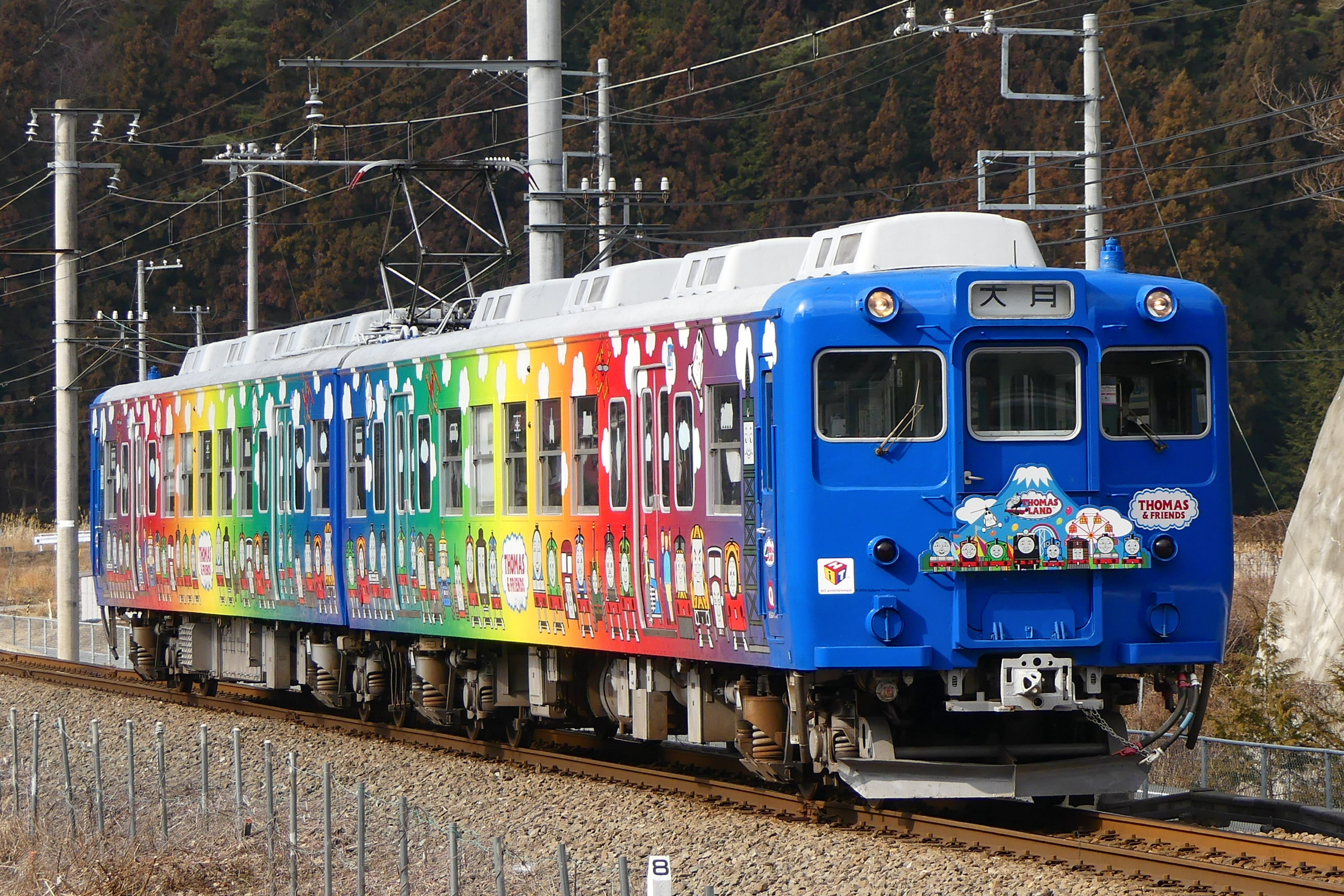
The 5000 series Thomas Land Express EMU in January 2018

== See also ==
- Tenjō-Yama Park Mt. Kachi Kachi Ropeway
- List of railway companies in Japan
- List of railway lines in Japan
