= Kawaguchiko Mt. Fuji Panoramic Ropeway =

Japanese aerial lift

Coordinates: 35°30′13.7″N 138°46′27.1″E

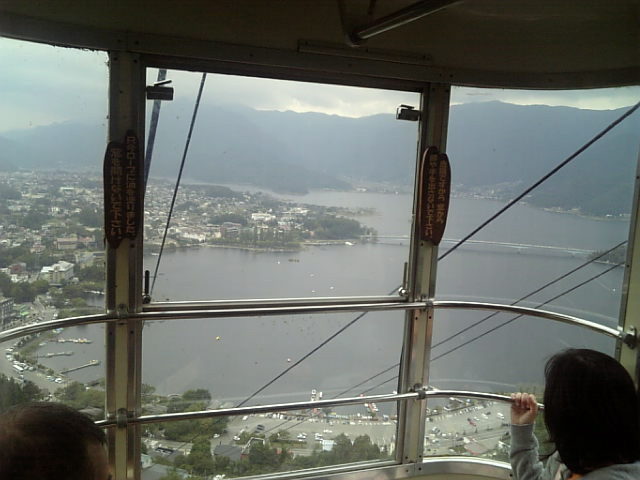
The view from the cabin

The ~Kawaguchiko~ Mt. Fuji Panoramic Ropeway (~河口湖~ 富士山パノラマロープウェイ, ~Kawaguchi-ko~ Fujisan Panorama Rōpuwei), is a Japanese aerial lift line in Fujikawaguchiko, Yamanashi, operated by Fuji Kyuko. Opened in 1959, the line climbs Mount Tenjō from the shores of Lake Kawaguchi, one of the Fuji Five Lakes. The observatory has a view of the lake, as well as Aokigahara forest, and Mount Fuji.

== Basic data ==
- System: Aerial tramway, 3 cables
- Cable length: 460 m (1,509 ft)
- Vertical interval: 219 m (719 ft)
- Maximum gradient: 34°07′
- Operational speed: 3.4 m/s
- Passenger capacity per a cabin: 36
- Cabins: 2
- Stations: 2
- Duration of one-way trip: 3 minutes

== See also ==
- Fujikyuko Line
- List of aerial lifts in Japan
