= Fuji Kyuko =

Japanese passenger transportation company

Fujikyuko
- Native name: 富士急行株式会社
- Romanized name: Fujikyūkō kabushiki gaisha
- Type: Public KK
- Traded as: TYO: 9010
- Industry: Passenger transportation
- Headquarters: Fujiyoshida, Yamanashi, Japan
- Owner: FJ (11.90%); Nippon Life (9.96%); Fukoku Life (9.11%); Suruga Bank (2.90%); Hino Motors (2.86%); Tokyo Dome (2.35%); Yamanashi Chuo Bank (2.32%); Matsuya (0.36%); Odakyu (0.25%); Seiko (0.16%); Sanoyas Hishino Meisho (0.12%); RION (0.12%); Isuzu (0.09%); Mizuho Bank (0.09%); Joban Kosan (0.09%); Sanyo Electric Railway (0.09%); Tokyo Kisen (0.08%)
- Subsidiaries: Fuji Sanroku Electric Railway; Gakunan Railway Line; Tenjō-Yama Park Mt. Kachi Kachi Ropeway; Fuji-Q Highland
- Website: Official website (in Japanese)

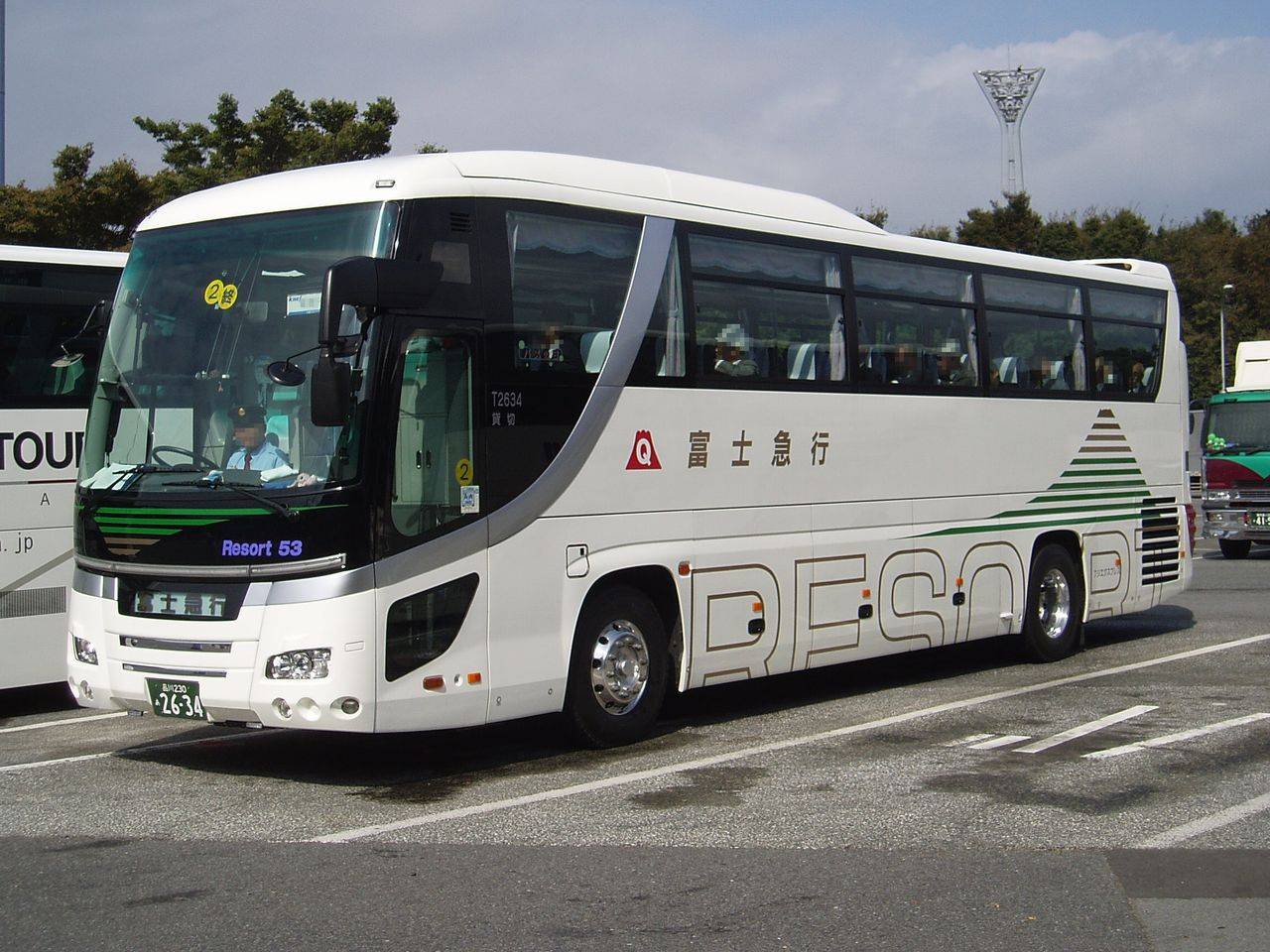
Fujikyū Bus

Fujikyuko Co., Ltd. (富士急行株式会社, Fuji Kyūkō kabushiki gaisha), commonly abbreviated as Fujikyu, is a passenger transportation company headquartered in Fujiyoshida, Yamanashi, Japan.

The company has some subsidiaries, Fujisanroku Electric Railway, which operates the Fujikyuko Line railway, and Fujikyu Bus, which runs regional and long-distance bus routes around east and south of Yamanashi and east of Shizuoka. The company also operates the Tenjō-Yama Park Mt. Kachi Kachi Ropeway, and Fuji-Q Highland amusement park.

== Affiliated companies ==
- The Gakunan Railway is a consolidated subsidiary of Fuji Kyuko because Fuji Kyuko makes a 25.59% investment in the company.
- The Yamanashi Chuo Bank is made a 1.16% investment by Fuji Kyuko.

== History ==
- The company signed a "sister railway" agreement with the Matterhorn Gotthard Bahn in Switzerland in 1991.
- On 1 April 2022, this company established Fuji Sanroku Denki Tetsudo and transferred the Fujikyuko Line to the new corporation.
