= Shimoyoshida Station =

Railway station in Fujiyoshida, Yamanashi Prefecture, Japan

Shimoyoshida Station 下吉田駅
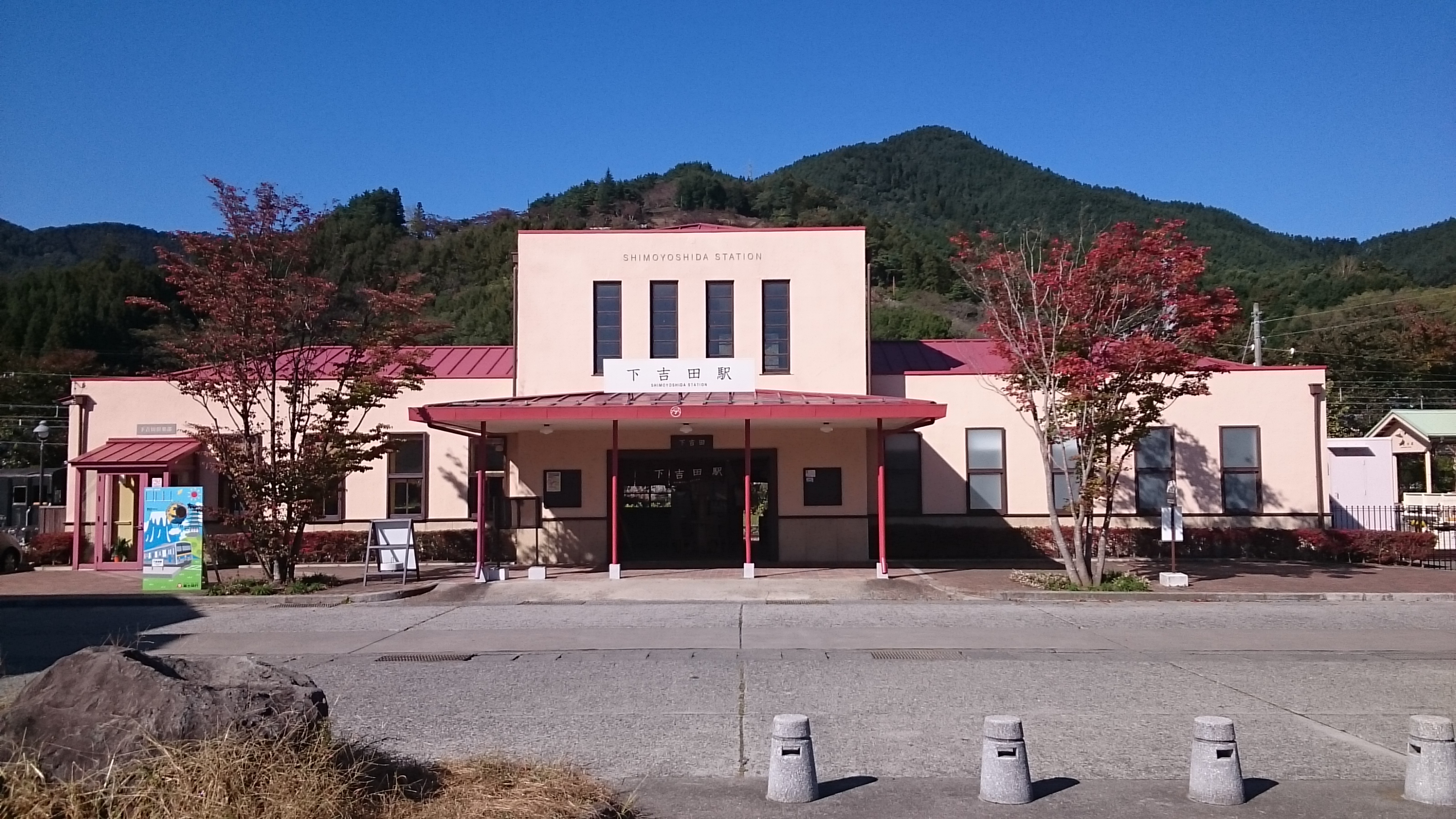
- The restored station building in October 2016

General information
- Location: 840 Arakura, Fujiyoshida-shi, Yamanashi-ken 403-0011; Japan
- Coordinates: 35°29′52″N 138°48′12″E
- Elevation: 753 m (2,470 ft)
- Operator: Fuji Kyuko
- Line: ■ Fujikyuko Line
- Distance: 21.1 km from Ōtsuki
- Platforms: 1 island platform
- Tracks: 2

Other information
- Status: Staffed
- Station code: FJ14
- Website: Official website

History
- Opened: 19 June 1929

Passengers
- FY1998: 280 daily
Location
- Location within Yamanashi Prefecture Location within Japan

Shimoyoshida Station (下吉田駅, Shimoyoshida-eki) is a railway station on the Fujikyuko Line in the city of Fujiyoshida, Yamanashi, Japan, operated by private railway operator Fuji Kyuko (Fujikyu).

== Lines ==
Shimoyoshida Station is served by the 26.6 km (16.5 mi) privately operated Fujikyuko Line from Ōtsuki to Kawaguchiko, and lies 21.1 kilometres (13.1 mi) from the terminus of the line at Ōtsuki Station.

== Station layout ==
The station is staffed and consists of an island platform serving two tracks, with the station building located on the south (down) side of the tracks. Passengers cross the track between the platforms via a level crossing. It has a waiting room and toilet facilities. The station is staffed.

=== Platforms ===
1	■ Fujikyuko Line	For Mt. Fuji, Fujikyu-Highland and Kawaguchiko
2	■ Fujikyuko Line	For Ōtsuki, Kōfu

=== Blue Train Terrace ===
On 29 April 2011, an area called the "Shimoyoshida Station Blue Train Terrace" was opened next to the station. This consists of a paved recreation area with tables next to a former 14 series "Blue Train" sleeping car, No. SuHaNeFu 14–20, which was part of the formation of the last run of the Hokuriku overnight service in March 2010. Three freight wagons that formerly ran on the Fujikyu Line are also on preserved on display.

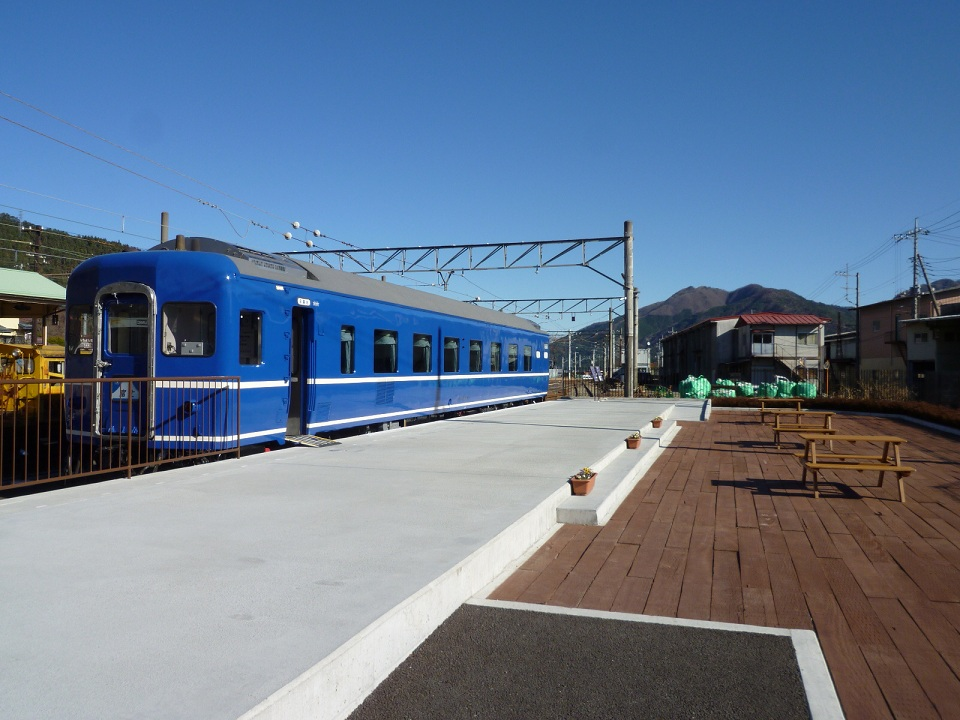
Preserved SuHaNeFu 14–20 at the Blue Train Terrace in December 2011

== Adjacent stations ==
«	Service	»
Fujikyuko Line
Tsurubunkadaigakumae	Fuji Excursion	Mt. Fuji
Tsurubunkadaigakumae	Fujisan Tokkyū	Mt. Fuji
Mitsutōge	Fuji Tozan Densha	Mt. Fuji
Yoshiikeonsenmae	Local	Gekkōji

== History ==
Shimoyoshida Station opened on 19 June 1929. The station building was reopened on 18 July 2009 following renovation work overseen by industrial designer Eiji Mitooka.

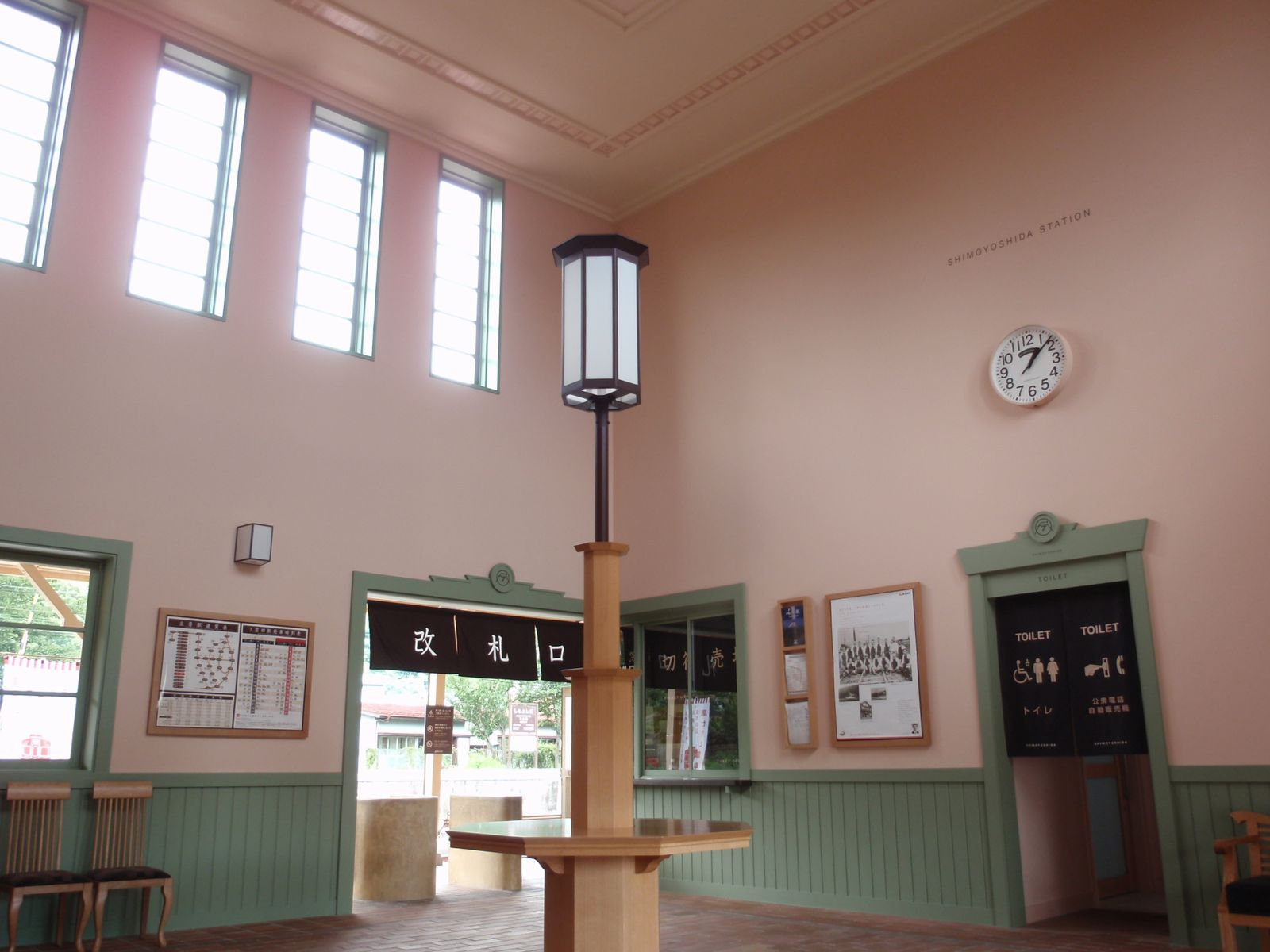
Restored interior of station building, August 2009

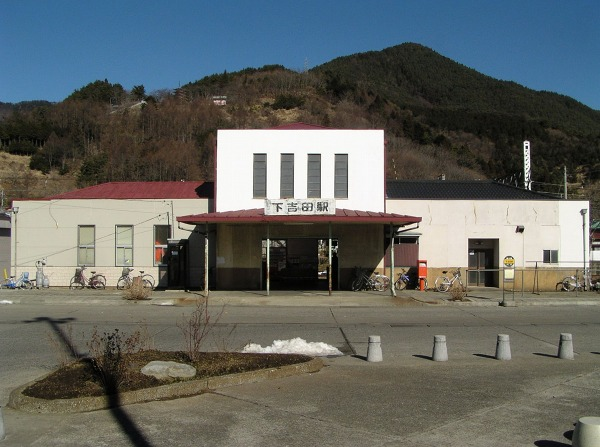
Station building before renovation, February 2006

== Passenger statistics ==
In fiscal 1998, the station was used by an average of 280 passengers daily.

== Surrounding area ==
- Chūō Expressway
- National Route 139
- Shimoyoshida No. 1 Elementary School
- Arakurayama Sengen Park
- Sangoku Daiichisan Arakura Fuji Sengen Shrine

== See also ==
- List of railway stations in Japan
