= Gekkōji Station =

Railway station in Fujiyoshida, Yamanashi Prefecture, Japan

Gekkōji Station 月江寺駅
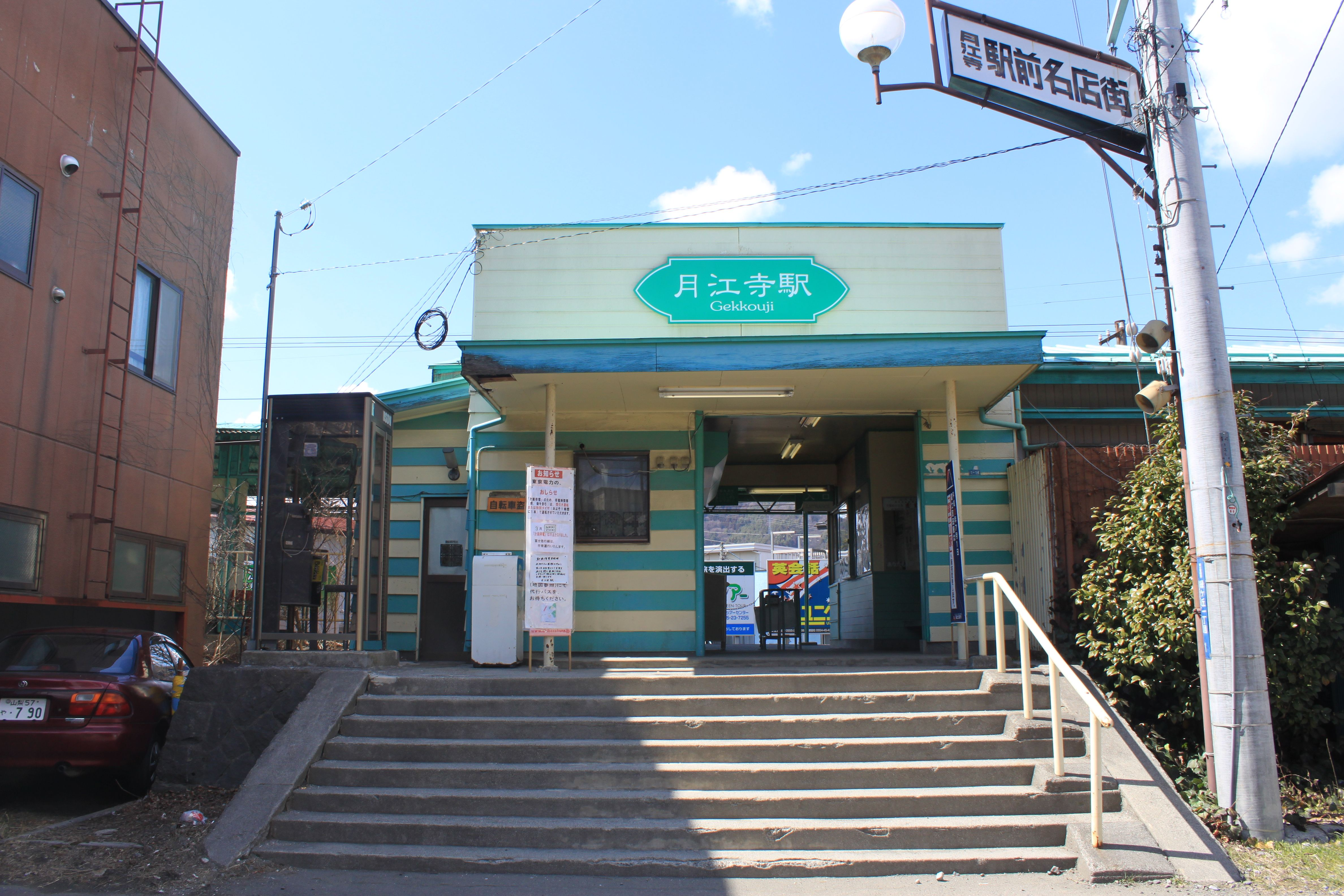
- Gekkōji Station, March 2011

General information
- Location: 1-1-14 Midorigaoka, Fujiyoshida-shi, Yamanashi-ken 403–0013; Japan
- Coordinates: 35°29′36″N 138°47′53″E
- Elevation: 776 m (2,546 ft)
- Operator: Fuji Kyuko
- Line: ■ Fujikyuko Line
- Distance: 18.8 km from Ōtsuki
- Platforms: 1 side platform
- Tracks: 1

Other information
- Status: Staffed
- Station code: FJ15
- Website: Official website

History
- Opened: 1931

Passengers
- FY1998: 1,031 daily
Location
- Location within Yamanashi Prefecture Location within Japan

Gekkōji Station (月江寺駅, Gekkōji-eki) is a railway station on the Fujikyuko Line in the city of Fujiyoshida, Yamanashi, Japan, operated by Fuji Kyuko (Fujikyu).

== Lines ==
Gekkōji Station is served by the 26.6 km (16.5 mi) privately operated Fujikyuko Line from Ōtsuki to Kawaguchiko, and lies 21.9 kilometres (13.6 mi) from the terminus of the line at Ōtsuki Station.

== Station layout ==
The station is staffed and consists of one side platform serving a single bidirectional track. It has a waiting room and toilet facilities.

== Adjacent stations ==
«	Service	»
Fujikyuko Line
Shimoyoshida	Local	Mt. Fuji
Fujisan Tokkyū: Does not stop at this station
Fuji Tozan Densha: Does not stop at this station

== History ==
Gekkōji Station opened on 1 October 1931.

== Passenger statistics ==
In fiscal 1998, the station was used by an average of 1,031 passengers daily.

== Surrounding area ==
- Fujiyoshida City Office
- Gekkōji Temple (after which the station is named)
- Fuji Gakuen High School
- Yoshida High School
- Fuji Gakuen Junior High School
- Shimoyoshida Junior High School
- Shimoyoshida No. 2 Elementary School
- Gekkōji Kindergarten

== See also ==
- List of railway stations in Japan
