= Kaiji (train) =

Train service operated in Japan

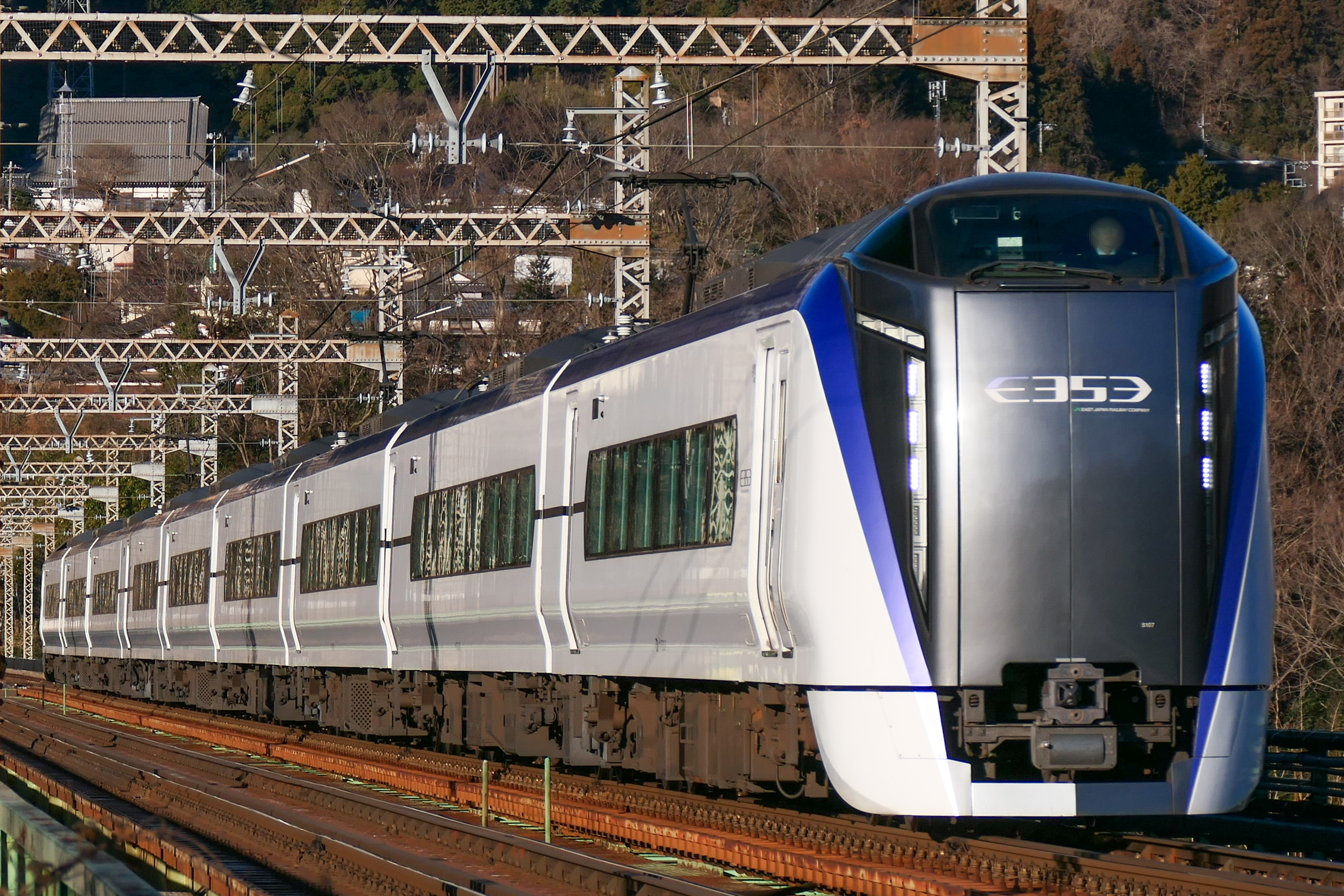
- E353 series EMU on a Kaiji service, January 2022

Overview
- Service type: Limited express
- Status: Operational
- Locale: Honshu, Japan
- First service: 1 October 1961 (Semi express); 12 December 1966 (Express); 13 March 1988 (Limited express)
- Current operator: JR East
- Former operator: JNR

Route
- Termini: Shinjuku; Kōfu
- Line used: Chūō Main Line

On-board services
- Class: Green + Standard
- Catering facilities: Trolley service

Technical
- Rolling stock: E353 series EMUs
- Track gauge: 1,067 mm (3 ft 6 in)
- Electrification: 1,500 V DC overhead
- Operating speed: 130 km/h (80 mph)

The Kaiji (かいじ) is a limited express train service in Japan operated by East Japan Railway Company (JR East). It runs mainly between Shinjuku Station in Tokyo and Kōfu Station in Kōfu, Yamanashi via the Chūō Main Line.

Chiba Kaiji, between Chiba and Ryūō, Hamakaiji, between Yokohama and Matsumoto, and Yama Kaiji, between Tachikawa and Kobuchizawa, have also existed as seasonal variants.

== Route ==
=== Kaiji ===
Shinjuku - Kōfu (Some trains operate between Tokyo and Ryūō.)

=== Chiba Kaiji ===
Chiba - Kōfu - Ryūō

=== Hamakaiji ===
Yokohama - Hachiōji - Matsumoto

=== Yama Kaiji ===
Tachikawa - Kobuchizawa

== Rolling stock ==
From 2018, new E353 series EMUs were introduced on Kaiji services, replacing the E257 series trains. The new trains feature power outlets for passenger use and WiFi internet service.

=== Kaiji ===
- E353 series EMUs (since 1 July 2018)

Former

- E257 series EMUs (from 2001 to 15 March 2019)
- 183/189 series EMUs (regular services until 2002 and seasonal extra services until 2018)

=== Chiba Kaiji ===
- E257-500 series

=== Hamakaiji ===
- 185 series

=== Yama Kaiji ===
- E257-500 series
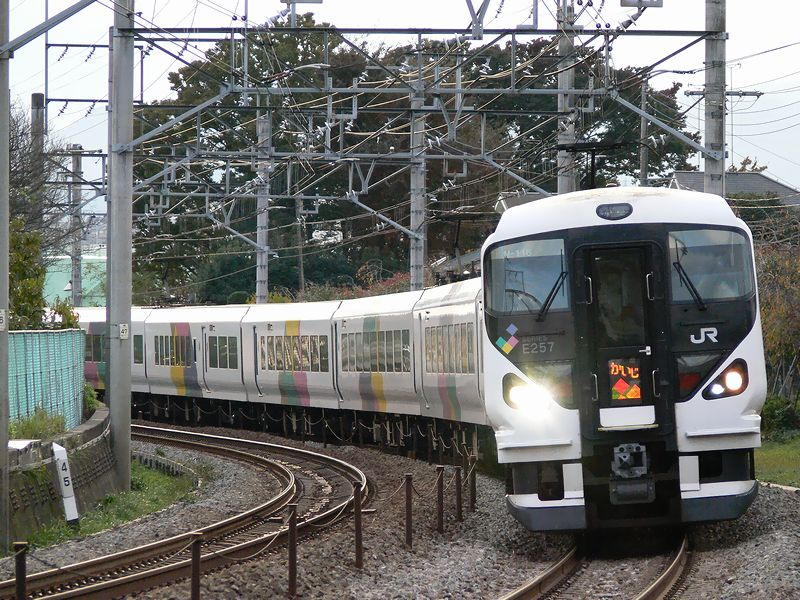
E257 series EMU on a Kaiji service, November 2006

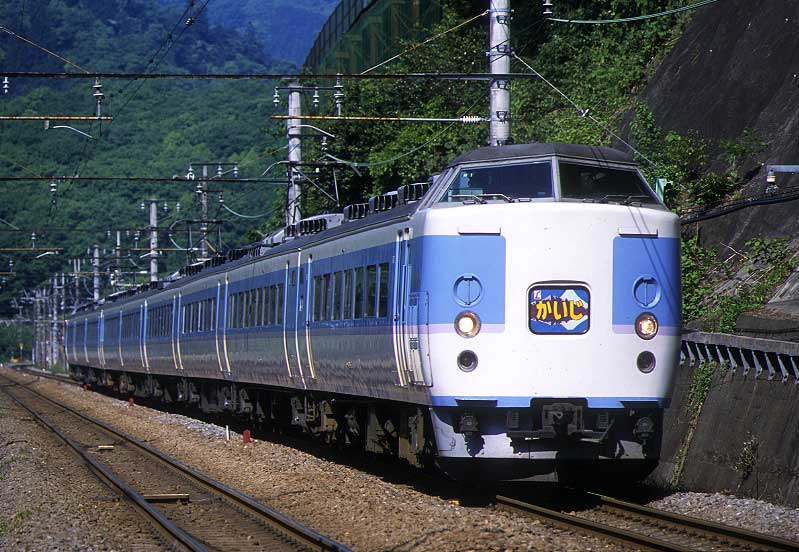
183 series EMU on a Kaiji service, May 2001

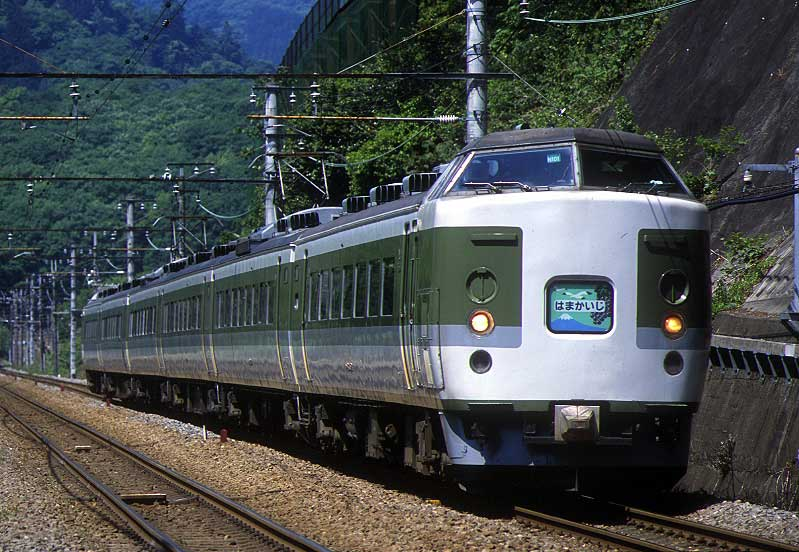
189 series EMU on a Hamakaiji service, May 2001

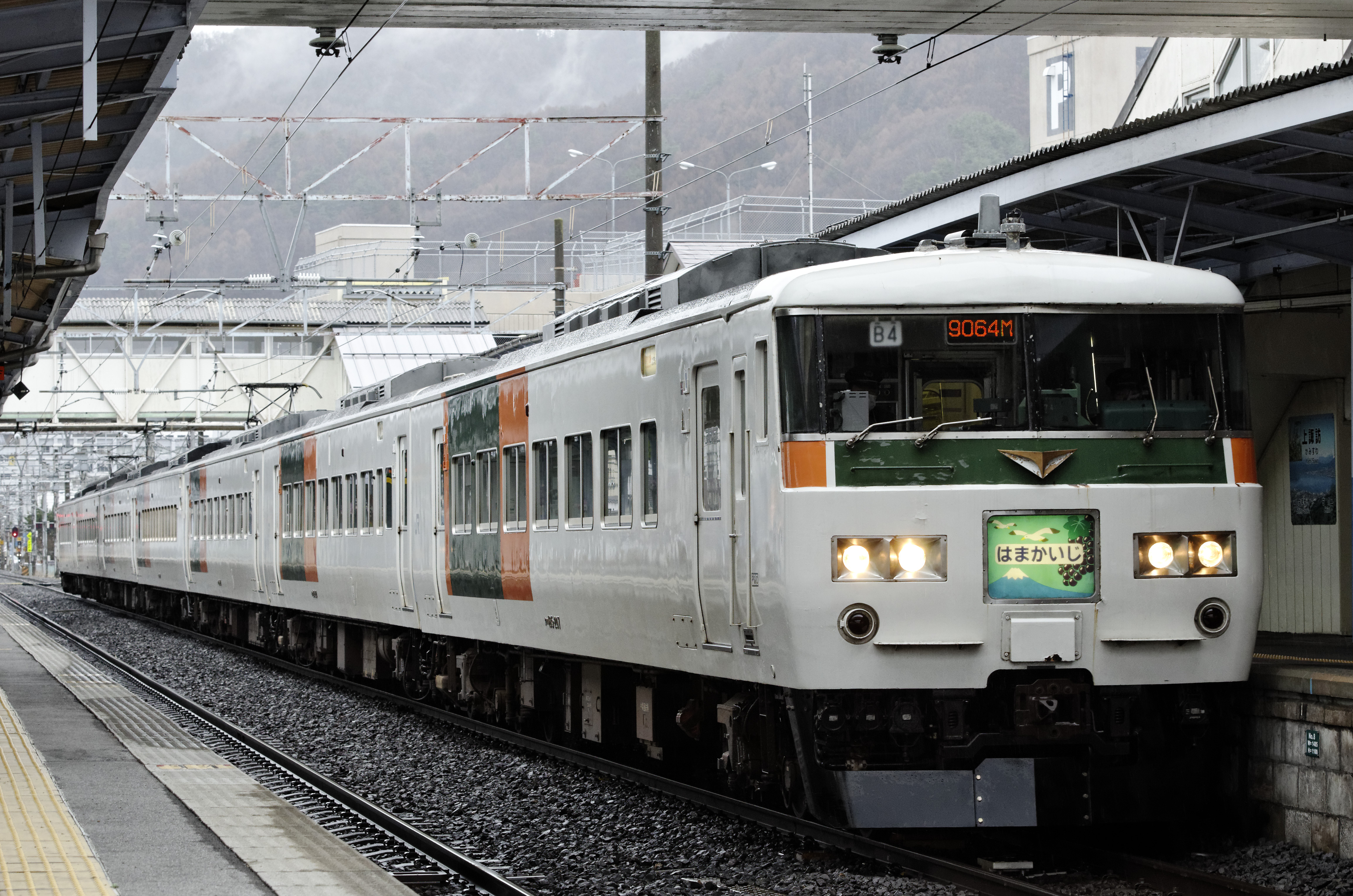
185 series EMU on a Hamakaiji service, April 2012

== Formations ==
=== Current formation ===
==== E353 series Kaiji ====
All Kaiji (E353 series) services are formed of nine cars, numbered 4 to 12, with car 12 at the Kofu end. Between Shinjuku and Otsuki, 4 Kaiji services are coupled with Fuji Excursion trains, which are numbered cars 1 to 3. All seats are reserved; passengers without seat reservations may use vacant seats. However, if the seat is reserved by another passenger, one has to change to another vacant seat when the passenger for that seat boards the train.

Car No.	4	5	6	7	8	9	10	11	12
Numbering	KuHa E353-0	MoHa E353-500	MoHa E352-500	MoHa E353-2000	SaHa E353-0	SaRoHa E353-0	MoHa E353-0	MoHa E352-0	KuHa E352-0
Accommodation	Reserved	Reserved	Reserved	Reserved	Reserved	Green	Reserved	Reserved	Reserved
Facilities	Toilet		Toilet		Toilet	Toilet		Toilet	

=== Past formations ===
==== E353 series Kaiji ====
Between 1 July 2018 and 15 March 2019, trains were formed of nine cars, numbered 4 to 12, with car 12 at the Kofu end. Between Shinjuku and Otsuki, 4 Kaiji services are coupled with Fuji Excursion trains, which are numbered cars 1 to 3. Some cars were designated non-reserved cars.

Car No.	4	5	6	7	8	9	10	11	12
Numbering	KuHa E353-0	MoHa E353-500	MoHa E352-500	MoHa E353-2000	SaHa E353-0	SaRoHa E353-0	MoHa E353-0	MoHa E352-0	KuHa E352-0
Accommodation	Non-reserved	Non-reserved	Non-reserved	Non-reserved	Reserved	Green	Reserved	Reserved	Reserved
Facilities	Toilet		Toilet		Toilet	Toilet		Toilet	

==== E257 series Kaiji ====
Most Kaiji (E257 series) services were formed of nine cars, numbered 3 to 11, with car 11 at the Kofu end. Cars 1 and 2 were added to some trains.

Car No.	1	2	3	4	5	6	7	8		9	10	11
Numbering	KuHa E257	KuHa E257	KuHa E257-100	MoHa E257	MoHa E256	MoHa E257-1000	SaHa E257	SaRoHa E257		MoHa E257-100	MoHa E256-100	KuHa E257
Accommodation	Reserved	Reserved	Non-reserved	Non-reserved	Non-reserved	Non-reserved	Reserved	Reserved	Green	Reserved	Reserved	Reserved
Facilities	Toilet		Toilet		Toilet		Toilet		Toilet		Toilet	

==== 185 series Hamakaiji ====
The seasonal Hamakaiji services were formed of 7-car 185 series EMUs based at Tamachi Depot (Omiya Depot from 2013 onwards) in Tokyo, with car 1 at the Yokohama end.

Car No.	1	2	3	4	5	6	7
Numbering	KuHa 185-200	MoHa 184-200	MoHa 185-200	SaRo 185-200	MoHa 184-200	MoHa 185-200	KuHa 185-300
Accommodation	Reserved	Non-reserved	Non-reserved	Green	Reserved	Reserved	Reserved

== History ==
=== Semi-express ===
The Kaiji service began on 1 October 1961 as a semi express operating between Shinjuku and Kōfu. The name was derived from the old name, Kai (甲斐), of Yamanashi Prefecture. Services were operated using KiHa 58 series diesel multiple unit (DMU) trains in between duties on long-distance Alps and Hakuba express services. DMUs were used on these services due to the restricted tunnel clearances along the line prohibiting the use of electric trains. The outbound service departed from Shinjuku at 14:50, arriving at Kōfu at 17:19. The return working departed from Kōfu at 18:28, arriving at Shinjuku at 21:20. The Kaiji services were however discontinued and integrated with the Alps express services from the start of the revised timetable on 1 October 1965 when electric trains were introduced.

=== Express ===
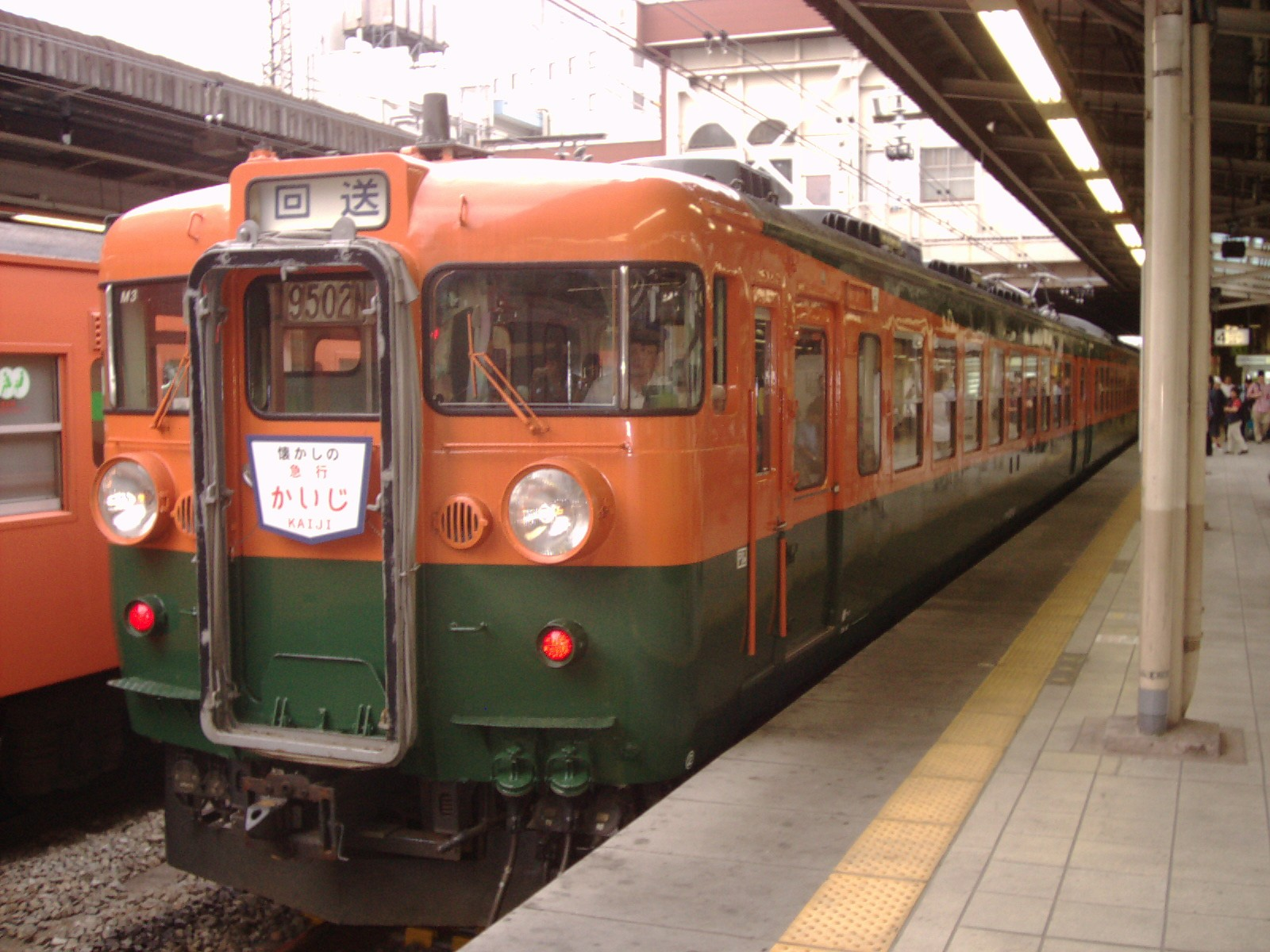
A 165 series EMU on a special Kaiji express service, July 2003

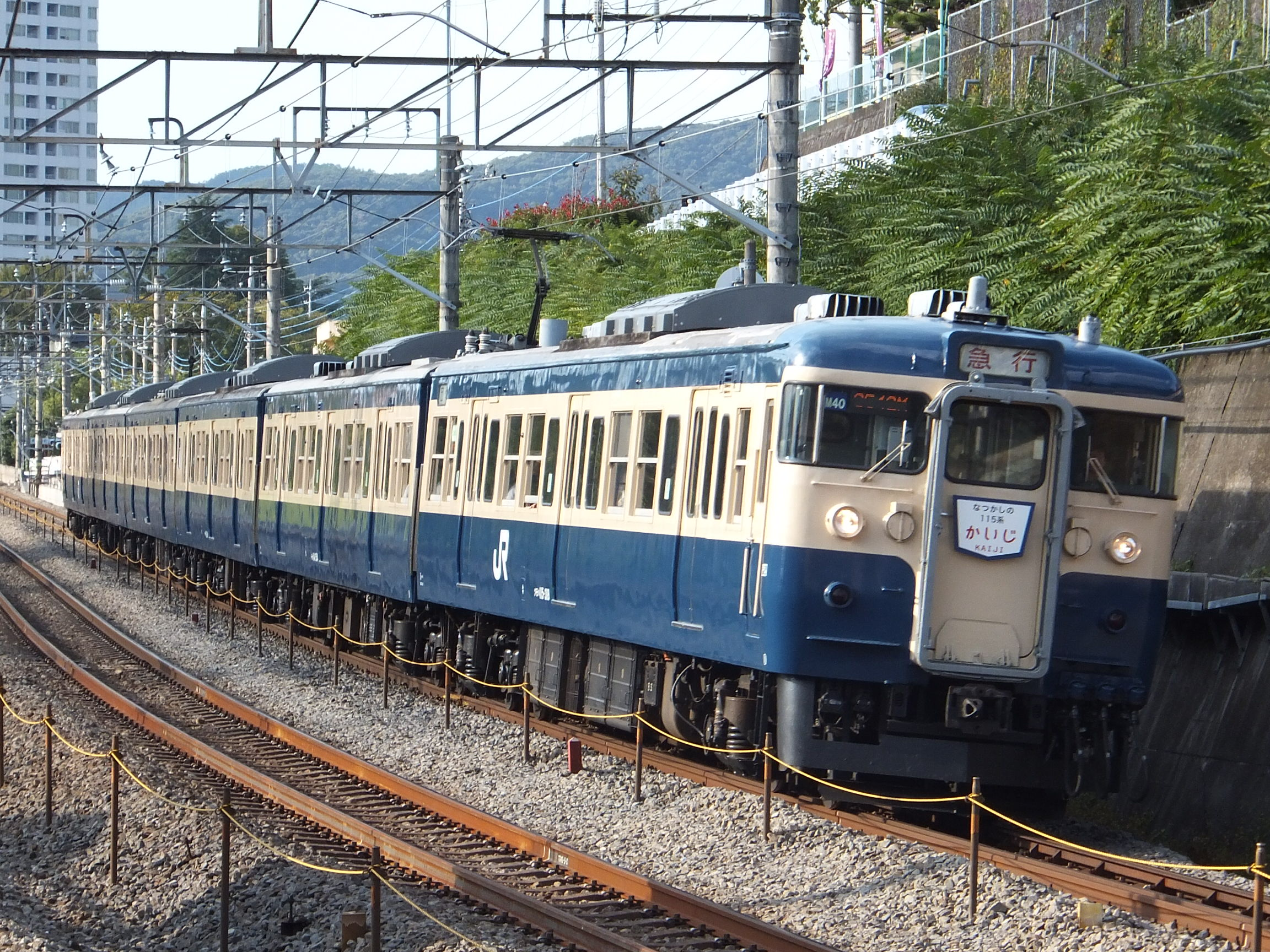
A 115 series EMU on a special Kaiji express service, October 2012

The Kaiji name was revived from 12 December 1966 for use on express services aimed at business users, operating between Shinjuku and Matsumoto using 12-car 165 series EMU formations in between duties on longer-distance Alps services. The early morning up working departed from Matsumoto at 04:50, arriving at Shinjuku at 09:34. The evening down service departed from Shinjuku at 18:55, arriving at Matsumoto at 23:36. From the start of the 1 October 1968 timetable revision, the Shinjuku - Matsumoto service was integrated with the other Alps express services also operating between Shinjuku and Matsumoto, and the Kaiji name was used for five new return express services operating between Shinjuku and Kōfu. Due to the seasonal nature of ridership on these services, three of the five return workings were designated as seasonal services, operating only during peak seasons. These services were operated using outer-suburban 115 series EMUs, whereas the two regular services were operated using 165 series express EMUs with first-class accommodation and buffet facilities. In response to the lack of first class accommodation, a 115 series set reformed with a 165 series "SaRo 165" Green car was used on some services. The use of suburban rolling stock on express services requiring payment of a supplement was not popular, however, and the seasonal services were downgraded to "Rapid" services by 1978, leaving just the two regular Kaiji express services using 165 series rolling stock. The remaining Kaiji services were discontinued from the start of the 1 November 1986 timetable following the introduction of new Azusa limited express services.

=== Limited express ===
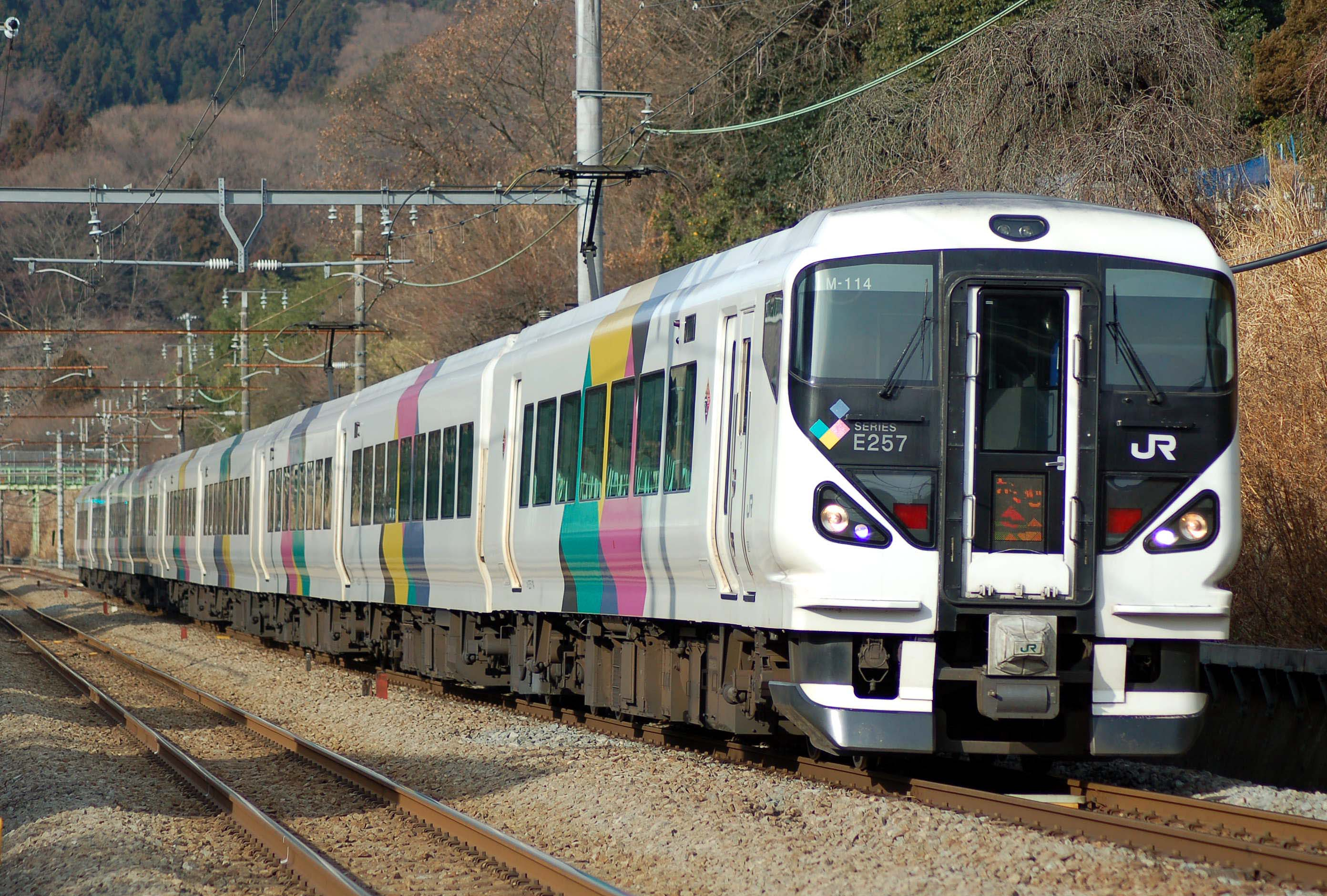
A E257 series EMU on a Kaiji limited express service in January 2008

From 13 March 1988, five of the Azusa limited express services operating between Shinjuku and Kōfu were expanded to nine return workings daily and renamed Kaiji. Initially operated using 6-car 183 series EMUs, all Kaiji services were operated using 9-car sets from the start of the December 1993 timetable revision. These were lengthened to 11-car sets from October 1997.

Smoking was prohibited in all cars from 18 March 2007. From March 2019, the twice-daily 3-car Fuji Excursion (富士回遊) limited express services connecting Shinjuku and Kawaguchiko are coupled with the Kaiji services between Shinjuku and Otsuki. At Otsuki Station, the two trains decouple and separate.

== See also ==
- List of named passenger trains of Japan
