= Fuji Excursion =

Japanese limited express train service

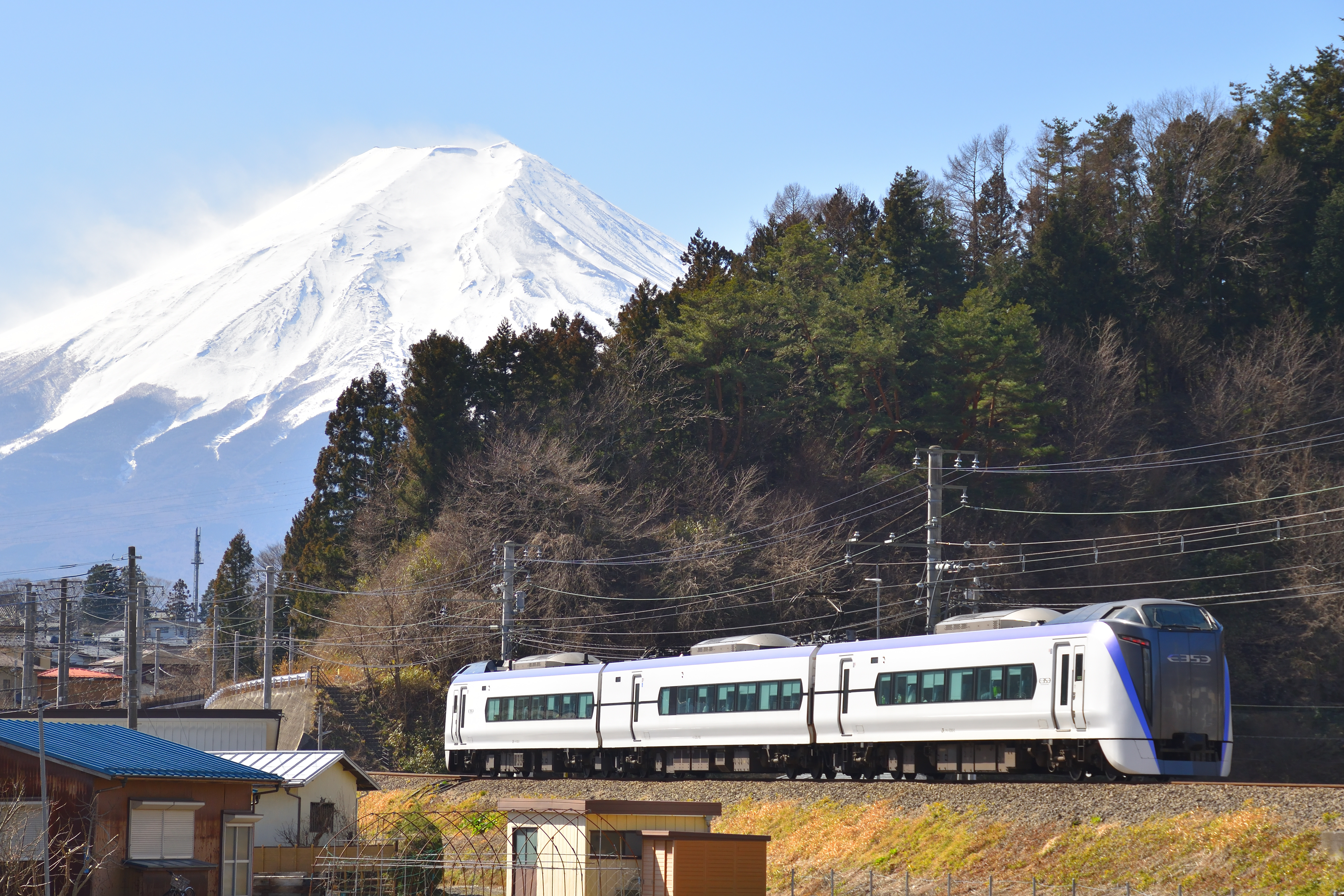
- The rolling stock for the Fuji Excursion, E353 series

Overview
- Service type: Limited express
- Status: In service
- Locale: (Chiba Prefecture), Tokyo, Kanagawa Prefecture, Yamanashi Prefecture
- First service: 16 March 2019
- Current operators: JR East; Fuji Kyuko

Route
- Termini: Shinjuku; Kawaguchiko
- Lines used: JR East: (Chūō-Sobu Line), Chūō Main Line; Fuji Kyuko: Fujikyuko Line

On-board services
- Class: Standard class only

Technical
- Rolling stock: E353 series EMUs
- Track gauge: 1,067 mm (3 ft 6 in)
- Electrification: 1500 V DC overhead
- Operating speed: 130 km/h (81 mph) (on Chūō Line); 60 km/h (37 mph) (on Fujikyuko Line)

The Fuji Excursion (富士回遊, Fuji Kaiyū) is a regular limited express service operated by East Japan Railway Company (JR East) and Fuji Kyuko, between Shinjuku on the Chūō Line (some services extended to Chiba on the Chūō-Sobu Line) and Kawaguchiko on the Fujikyuko Line.

== Summary ==
Services began operation with the implementation of JR East's timetable revision on 16 March 2019. It is the first routinely operated limited express between JR and Fuji Kyuko.

== Service pattern ==
Four round trips are operated per day, and these services are coupled with Azusa or Kaiji services (with the same train number) between Ōtsuki and Shinjuku. Sometimes, Fuji Excursion trains operate on their own.

=== Stops ===
(Chiba → Funabashi → Kinshichō → ) Shinjuku - Tachikawa - Hachiōji - Ōtsuki - Tsurubunkadaigakumae - Shimoyoshida - Mt. Fuji - Fujikyu-Highland - Kawaguchiko

== Rolling stock ==
All services are operated by E353 series 3-car sets, numbered 1 to 3, with car 1 at the Shinjuku end. Between Ōtsuki and Shinjuku, the train will couple with the Azusa or the Kaiji, which is numbered cars 4 to 12.

Car No.	1	2	3
Numbering	KuMoHa E353-0	MoHa E353-1000	KuMoHa E352-0
Accommodation	Reserved	Reserved	Reserved
Facilities	Toilet	Toilet	

== Ticketing ==
A limited express ticket has to be purchased to board the Fuji Excursion train, along with the basic fare ticket. There are two types of such limited express tickets, namely the Reserved Seat Ticket (座席指定券, Zaseki shitei ken), and the Unreserved Seat Ticket (座席未指定券, Zaseki mishitei ken).

The Reserved Seat Ticket enables a specified seat to be reserved for the holder. The reserved status for the seat is signified by a green overhead lamp on top of the corresponding seat.

The Unreserved Seat Ticket enables the holder to be seated on any unreserved seat. A red overhead lamp signifies that the seat is unreserved; while a yellow overhead lamp signifies that the seat is reserved for the later part of the journey, implying that one has to give up their seat to the passenger who has reserved the seat, when they board the train later.

Passengers holding the Japan Rail Pass or JR East Pass may ride free of charge between Shinjuku and Ōtsuki station. A supplementary ticket is needed to travel further than Otsuki, as the line is no longer operated by JR East. Ticket for this section can be purchased in advance at stations from Fuji-kyuko, or on the train. JR East cannot sell tickets or reservations that contain only the section of Fuji-kyuko. The JR East Tokyo Wide pass does include travel on the Fuji-kyuko section.

== History ==
- 14 December 2018: Service announced
- 16 March 2019: Service begins

== See also ==
- List of named passenger trains of Japan
- Kaiji, another limited express service that the Fuji Excursion would couple with
