= Mt. Fuji Station =

Railway station in Fujiyoshida, Yamanashi Prefecture, Japan

Mt. Fuji Station 富士山駅
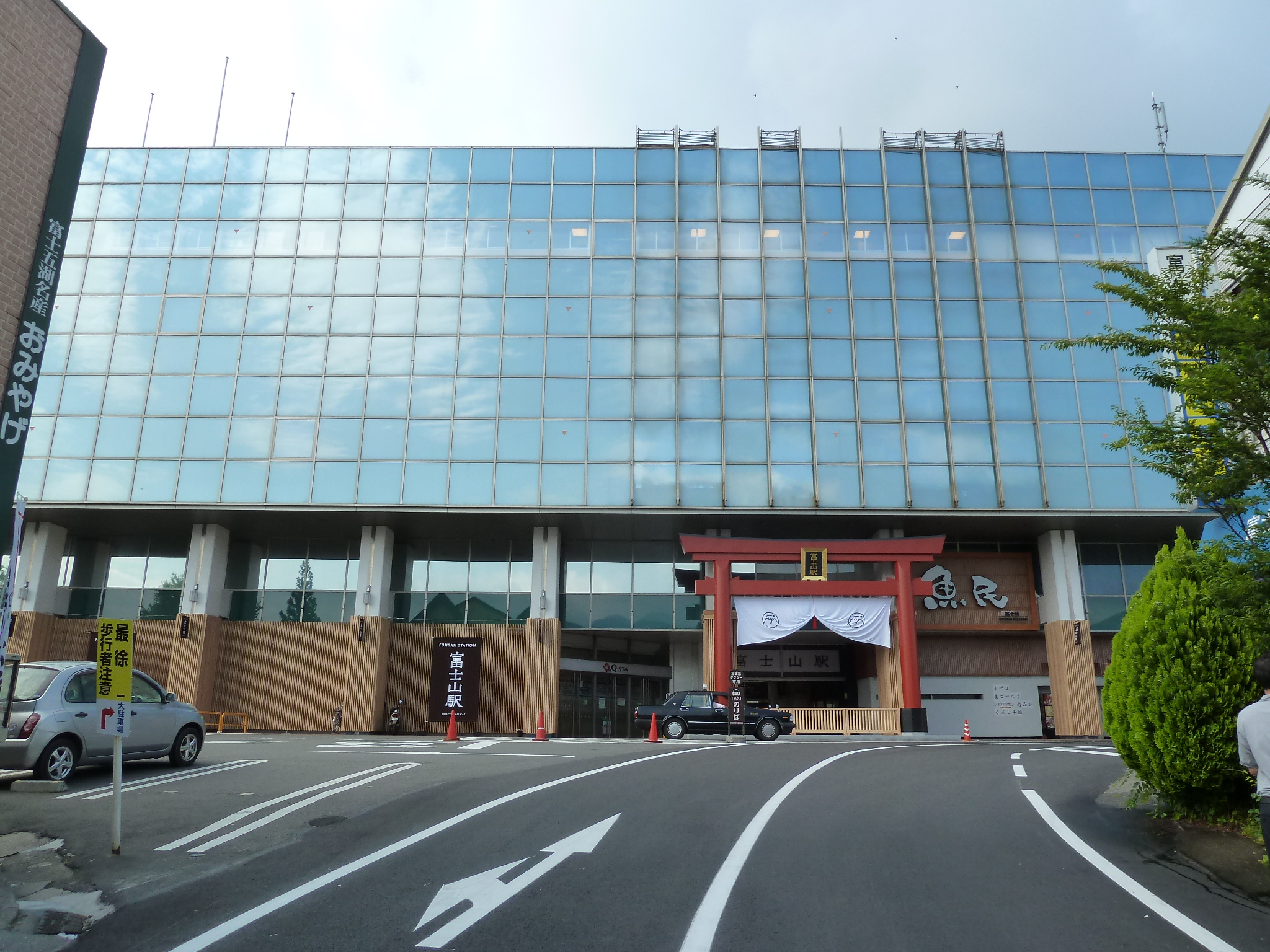
- Mt. Fuji Station in July 2011

General information
- Location: 2-5-1 Kamiyoshida, Fujiyoshida-shi, Yamanashi-ken 403–0005; Japan
- Coordinates: 35°29′01″N 138°47′45″E
- Elevation: 809 m (2,654 ft)
- Operator: Fuji Kyuko
- Line: ■ Fujikyuko Line
- Distance: 23.6 km from Ōtsuki
- Platforms: 3 bay platforms
- Tracks: 3

Other information
- Status: Staffed
- Station code: FJ16
- Website: Official website

History
- Opened: 19 June 1929
- Former names: Fuji-Yoshida (until 2011)

Passengers
- FY2011: 1,406 daily
Location
- Location within Yamanashi Prefecture Location within Japan

Mt. Fuji Station (富士山駅, Fujisan-eki) is a railway station on the Fujikyuko Line in the city of Fujiyoshida, Yamanashi, Japan, operated by the private railway operator Fuji Kyuko (Fujikyu). The station is located at an altitude of 809 metres (2,654 ft). This is one of the gateway stations to Mount Fuji and Fuji Five Lakes, including Lake Kawaguchi and Lake Yamanaka.

== Lines ==
Fujisan Station is served by the 26.6 km (16.5 mi) privately operated Fujikyuko Line from Ōtsuki to Kawaguchiko, and lies 23.6 kilometres (14.7 mi) from the terminus of the line at Ōtsuki Station.

== Station layout ==
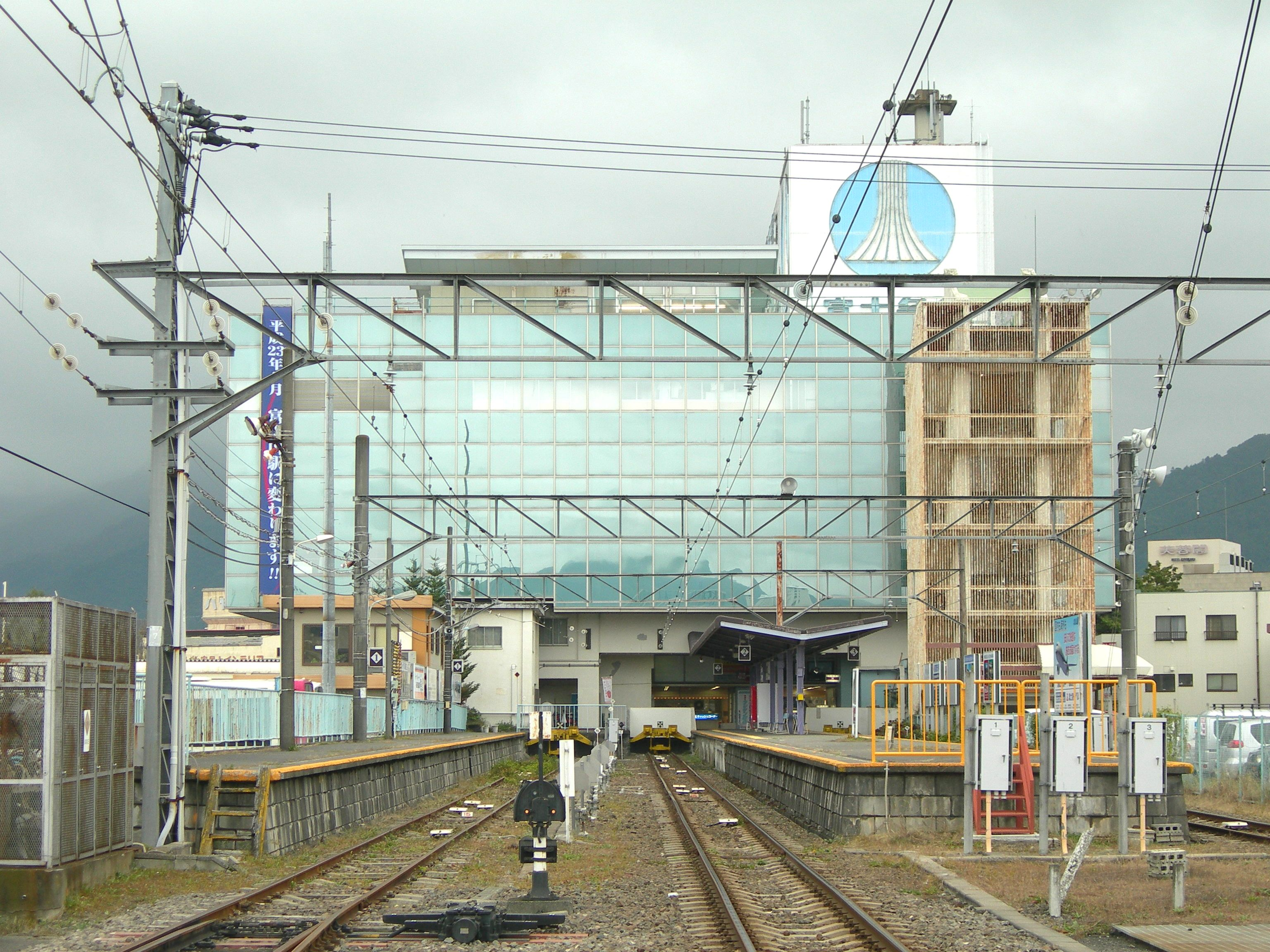
View of the platforms, with platform 1 on the left, October 2010

The station is a terminus station where trains reverse en route between Ōtsuki and Kawaguchiko, this means for through trains heading towards either destinations, the driver is required to change ends to head back out before diverging onto the appropriate route. It consists of three bay platforms. It has waiting rooms and toilet facilities. The station is staffed.

=== Platforms ===
1	■ Fujikyuko Line	(not used)
2	■ Fujikyuko Line	for Kawaguchiko
3	■ Fujikyuko Line	for Ōtsuki

== Adjacent stations ==
«	Service	»
Fujikyuko Line
Shimoyoshida	Fuji Excursion	Fujikyu-Highland
Shimoyoshida	Fujisan Tokkyū	Fujikyu-Highland
Shimoyoshida	Fuji Tozan Densha	Fujikyu-Highland
Gekkōji	Local	Fujikyu-Highland

== History ==
The station opened on 19 June 1929 as Fuji-Yoshida Station (富士吉田駅). It was renamed on 1 July 2011, following renovations overseen by industrial designer Eiji Mitooka.

== Passenger statistics ==
In fiscal 2011, the station was used by an average of 1,406 passengers daily.

== Surrounding area ==
- Hibarigaoka High School
- Yoshida Junior High School
- Yoshida Elementary School
- National Route 137
- National Route 139

== Bus services ==
=== Long-distance services ===
- Chūō Kōsoku Bus; For Shinjuku Station
- For Tokyo Station
- For Shibuya Station (Shibuya Mark City)
- Chūō Kōsoku Bus; For Seiseki-sakuragaoka Station, Tama-Center Station, and Minami-ōsawa Station
- For Ikebukuro Station, Kawagoe Station, and Ōmiya Station
- Airport Limousine; For Shinagawa Station and Haneda Airport
- Airport Limousine; For Akihabara Station and Narita International Airport
- Resort Express; For Nagoya Station
- For Nyūkawa and Takayama Station
- For Fukui Station (Fukui), Komatsu Station and Kanazawa Station
- Fujiyama Liner; For Kyoto Station, Osaka Station, Namba Station (OCAT), and Ōsaka Abenobashi Station
- Hakata-Fujiyama Express; For Kokura Station, Nishitetsu Fukuoka Station (Tenjin), and Hakata Station

=== Local routes ===
- For Mount Fuji 5th stage
- For Gotemba Station and Gotemba Premium Outlets via Oshino and Lake Yamanaka
- For Shin-Fuji Station (Tokaido Shinkansen) via Lake Motosu and Fujinomiya Station
- For Kofu Station via Isawa-onsen Station
- For Kawaguchiko Station via Fuji-Q Highland
