= Myōjinyama =

Coordinates: 35°24′40″N 138°55′04″E

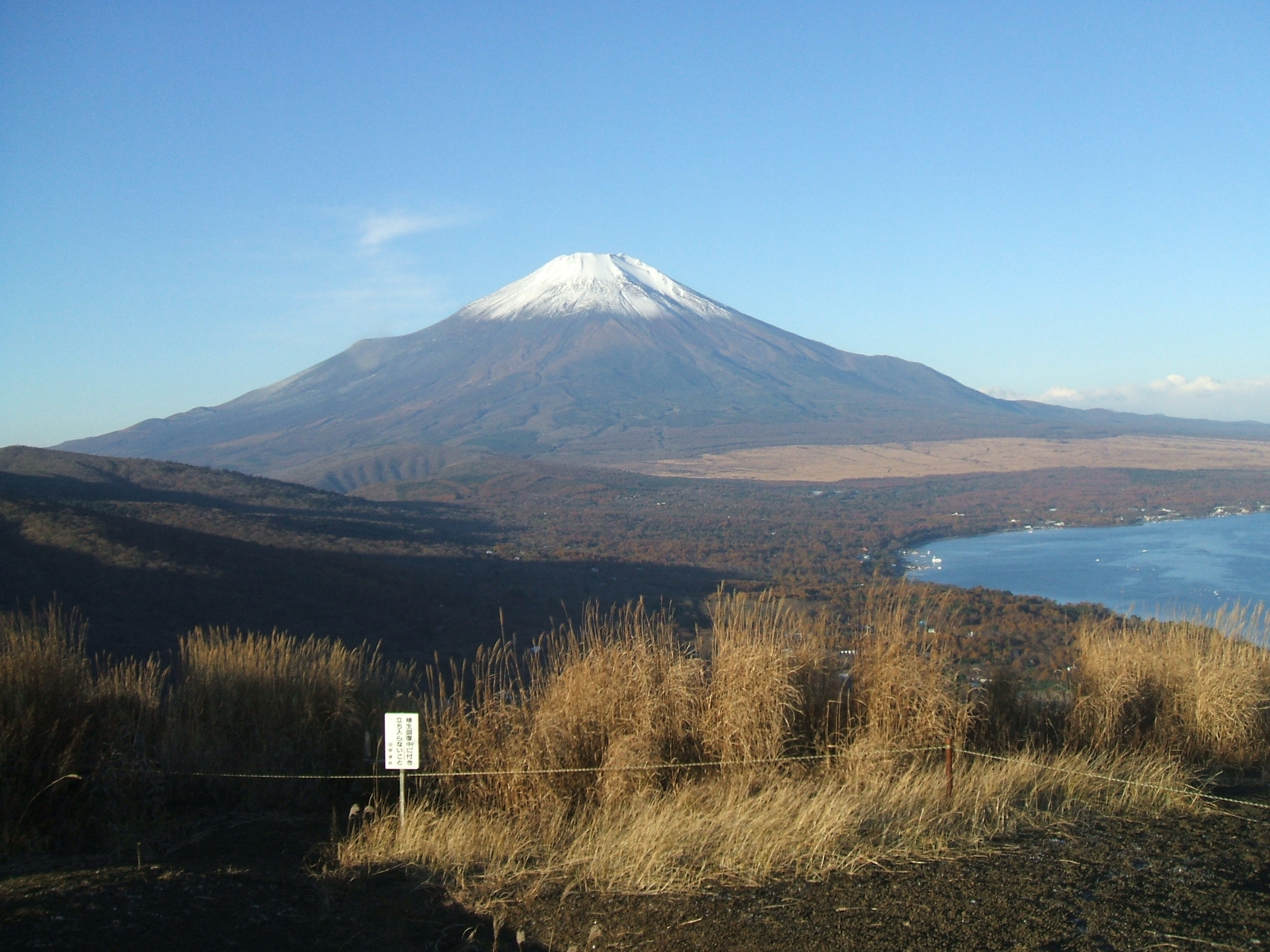
view from the launch

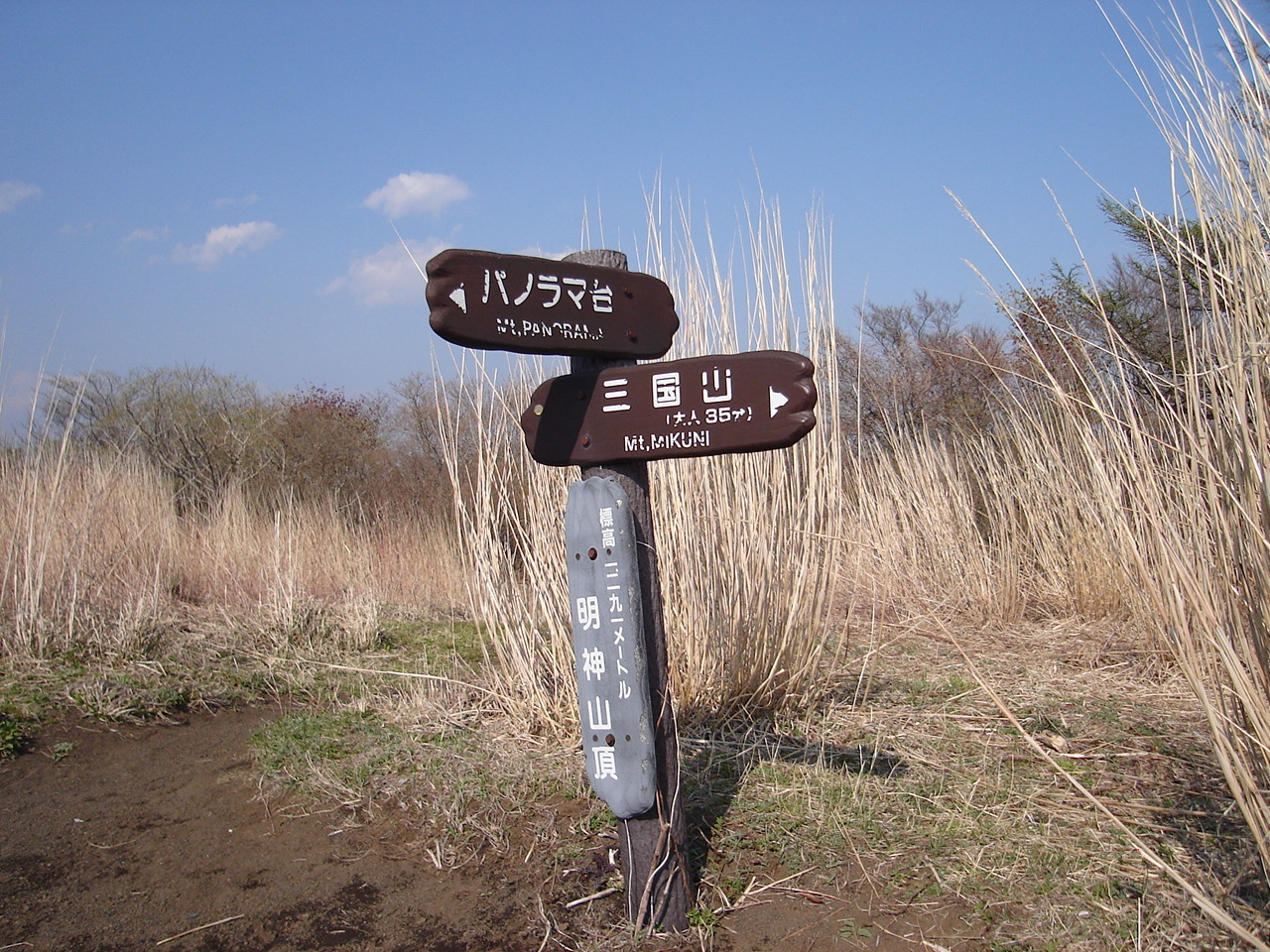
Indicator at the top

Myōjinyama (明神山) is a grassy area on a mountain ridge in Japan, 20 kilometres (12 mi) east from Mount Fuji and 5 kilometres (3.1 mi) south-east from Lake Yamanaka, off of road 147. The area is suitable for hiking and paragliding.

In 2024, a new observation deck (山中湖明神山パノラマ台) offering panoramic views of Mount Fuji and Lake Yamanaka was opened to the public.

== Gliding at Myōjinyama ==
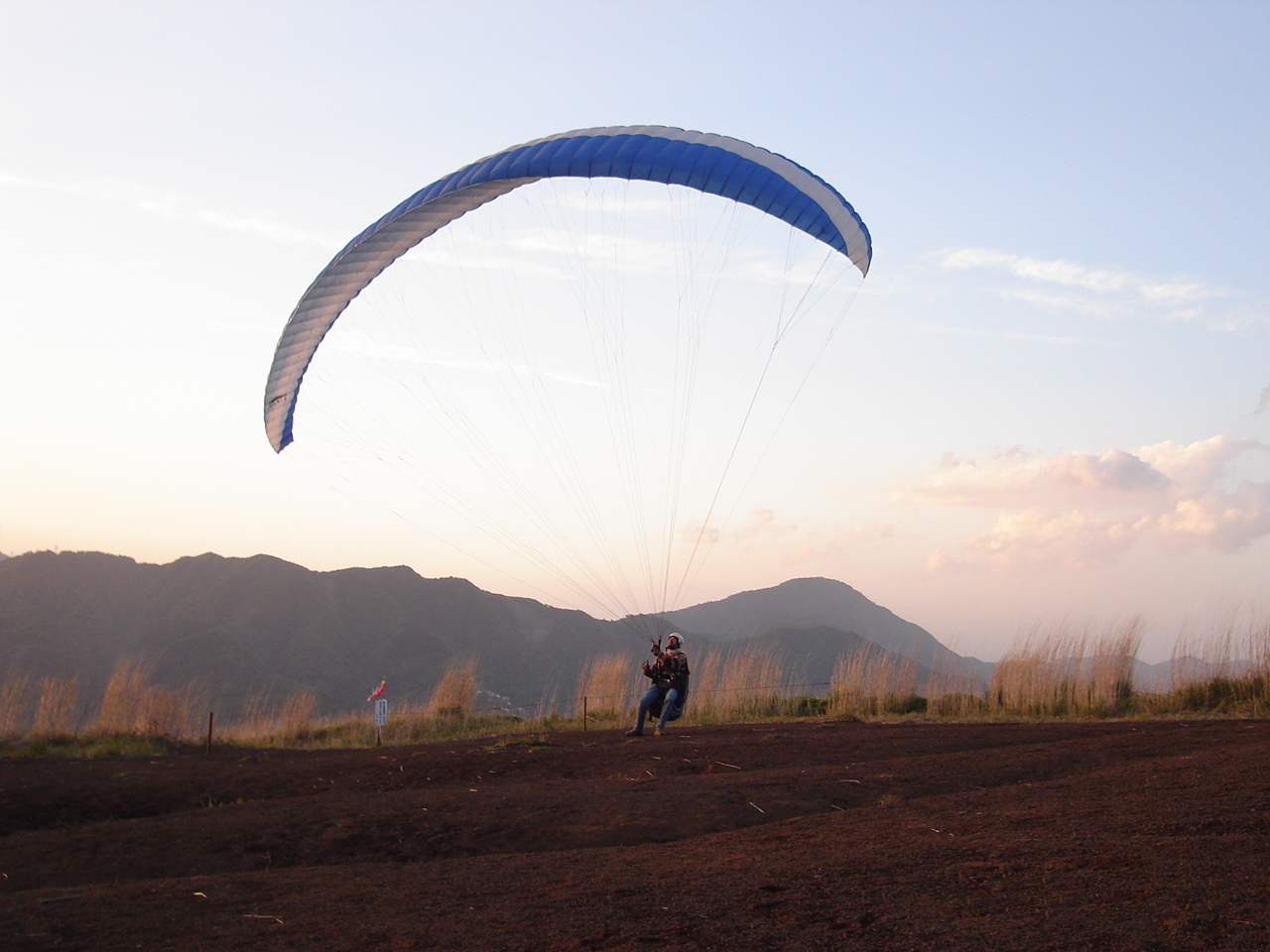
Paraglider at Myōjinyama launch

The paragliding at Myōjinyama requires neither registration nor inscription fee. The launch is shallow, thus suitable for novice pilots. The 1 km^{2} (0.39 sq mi) area can be used for both launches and landings. There is also an additional free landing zone courtesy of the Minami Green Hill Resort in the vicinity of Lake Yamanaka. Other landing areas include most of the coast of Lake Yamanaka and the multiple tennis courts and football fields that can serve for an emergency landing.

=== Wind conditions ===
The best launch conditions are with a western to northern wind; so, the site is complementary to Gotenba Gogome and Zubashiri at Mt. Fuji, which is a 30-minute to drive from Myōjinyama. Lake Yamanaka makes the lift smooth; but at other wind directions, the lift is bumpy.
