= Fujikyu-Highland Station =

Railway station in Fujikawaguchiko, Yamanashi Prefecture, Japan

Fujikyu-Highland Station 富士急ハイランド駅
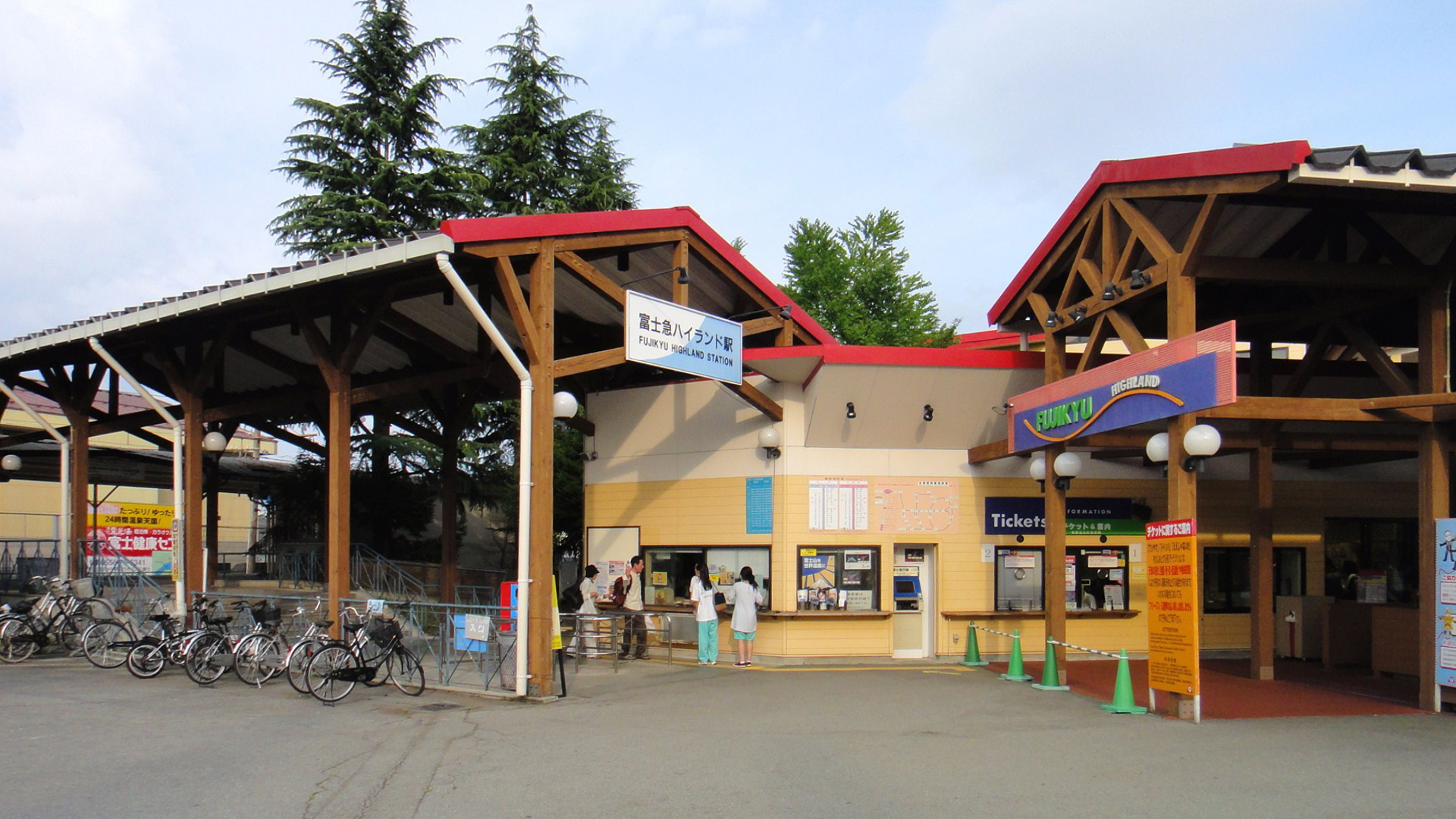
- Fujikyu Highland Station entrance, July 2012

General information
- Location: 6663 Funatsu, Fujikawaguchiko-machi, Minamitsuru-gun, Yamanashi-ken; Japan
- Coordinates: 35°29′22″N 138°46′55″E
- Elevation: 829 m (2,720 ft)
- Operator: Fuji Kyuko
- Line: ■ Fujikyuko Line
- Distance: 25 km from Ōtsuki
- Platforms: 1 side platform

Other information
- Status: Unstaffed
- Station code: FJ17
- Website: Official website

History
- Opened: 1961
- Former names: Highland (until 1981)

Passengers
- FY2015: 1135 daily
Location
- Location within Yamanashi Prefecture Location within Japan

Fujikyu-Highland Station (富士急ハイランド駅, Fujikyū-Hairando-eki) is a railway station on the Fujikyuko Line in the town of Fujikawaguchiko, Yamanashi, Japan, operated by Fuji Kyuko (Fujikyu). It is located at an altitude of 829 metres (2,720 ft).

== Lines ==
Fujikyu-Highland Station is served by the 26.6 km (16.5 mi) privately operated Fujikyuko Line from Ōtsuki to Kawaguchiko, and lies 25.0 kilometres (15.5 mi) from the terminus of the line at Ōtsuki Station.

== Station layout ==
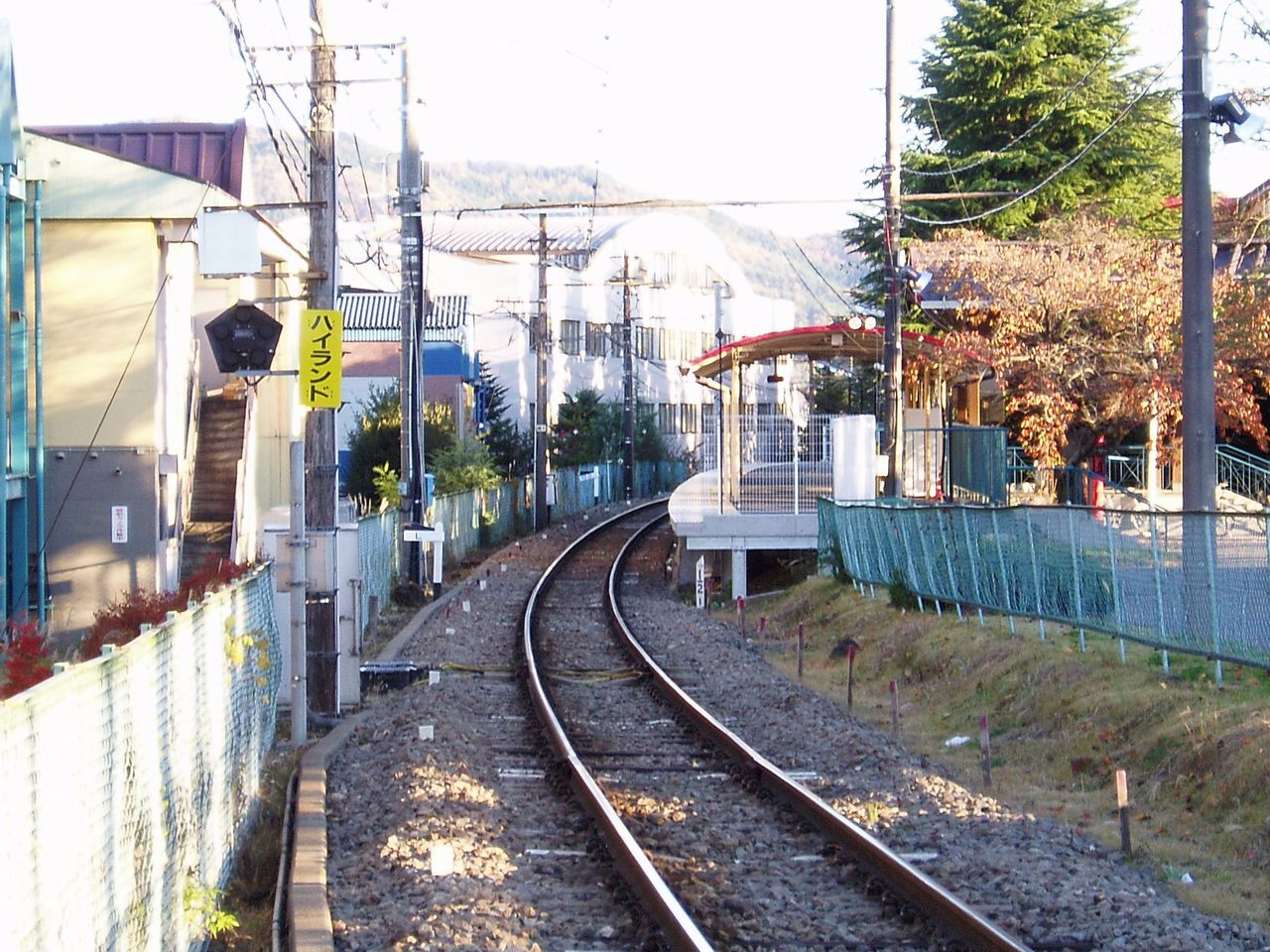
View of the station platform from the north (Kawaguchiko) direction, November 2007

The station is staffed and consists of one side platform serving a single bidirectional track. It has a waiting room but no toilet facilities. The station is staffed.

== Adjacent stations ==
«	Service	»
Fujikyuko Line
Mt. Fuji	Fuji Excursion	Kawaguchiko
Mt. Fuji	Fujisan Tokkyū	Kawaguchiko
Mt. Fuji	Fuji Tozan Densha	Kawaguchiko
Mt.Fuji	Local	Kawaguchiko

== History ==
The station opened on 1 December 1961 as Highland Station (ハイランド駅). It was renamed Fujikyu-Highland Station on 11 January 1981.

== Passenger statistics ==
In fiscal 2015, the station was used by an average of 1135 passengers daily.

== Surrounding area ==
- Fuji-Q Highland theme park
- Fujikawaguchiko High School
- Yoshida-nishi Elementary School
- Chūō Expressway
- National Route 137
