= Lake Yamanaka =

Lake in Yamanakako, Chūbu region, Japan

Lake Yamanaka Yamanaka-ko 山中湖
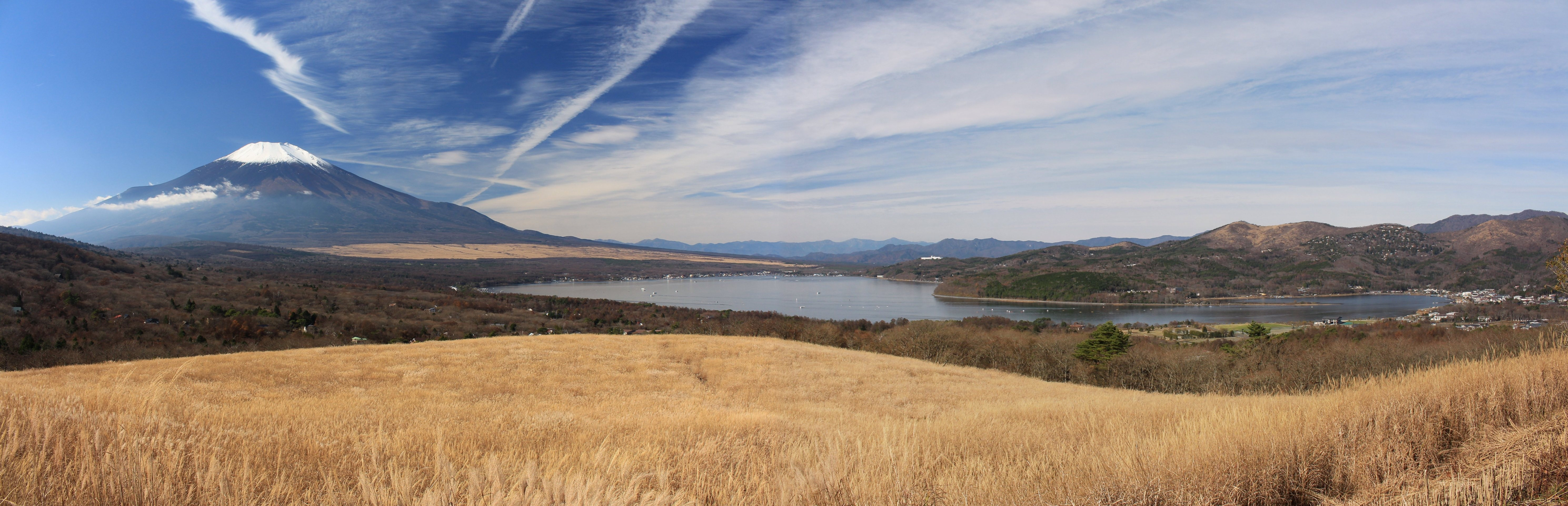
- With Mount Fuji from Myōjinyama

- Location within Japan
- Location: Yamanakako, Yamanashi
- Coordinates: 35°25′0″N 138°52′30″E
- Primary outflows: Sagami River
- Basin countries: Japan
- Surface area: 6.46 km^{2} (2.49 sq mi)
- Max. depth: 13.5 m (44 ft)
- Water volume: 0.069 km^{3} (56,000 acre⋅ft)
- Surface elevation: 982 m (3,222 ft)

Lake Yamanaka (山中湖, Yamanaka-ko, 'Lake in the Mountains') is located in the village of Yamanakako in Yamanashi Prefecture near Mount Fuji, Japan.

Lake Yamanaka is the largest of the Fuji Five Lakes in surface area and the highest in elevation. It is the third highest lake in Japan, with a mean surface altitude of 980.5 metres (3,217 ft). It is also the shallowest of the Fuji Five Lakes, with a maximum water depth of 13.5 metres (44 ft). It was formed by lava flows from an ancient eruption of Mount Fuji. It is drained by the Sagami River and is the only one of the Fuji Five Lakes to have a natural outflow.

Carp, dace and smelt were introduced to the lake in the Meiji period, although early efforts to introduce sockeye salmon were not successful. In more recent years, introduced exotics such as black bass and bluegill have increasingly displaced native species. In terms of plant life, a variety of marimo was discovered in the lake in 1956.

The lake is a popular recreational site for boating, fishing, water-skiing, windsurfing, sightseeing and swimming. If the wind comes from the west, the lake provides a smooth lift for paragliding at Mount Myōjinyama. There are also small cabins and sites available for camping. The lake is within the borders of the (Fuji-Hakone-Izu National Park).

In 2013 the lake was added to the World Heritage List as part of the Fujisan Cultural Site.

== Access ==
Early in the morning, when traffic is light on the Tōmei and Chūō Expressways, traveling between Tokyo and Lake Yamanaka takes an hour. The traffic becomes heavy later in the day, and the trip takes correspondingly longer. Japan National Route 138 and Japan National Route 413 run along the shores of the lake. Bus services are available from Fujisan Station (Fujikyuko Line), JR Gotemba Station (JR Gotemba Line), and JR Mishima Station (JR Shinkansen). Highway bus services are also available from Shinjuku Station (Tokyo).

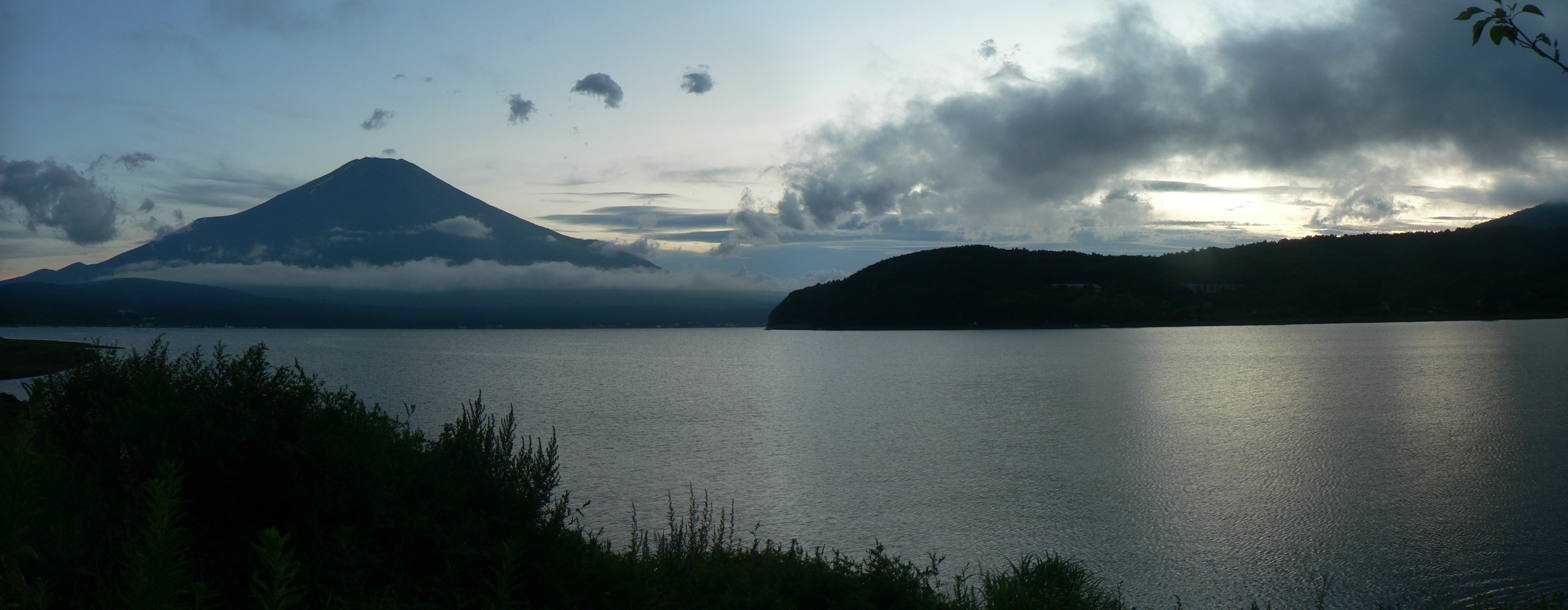
Mount Fuji and Lake Yamanaka

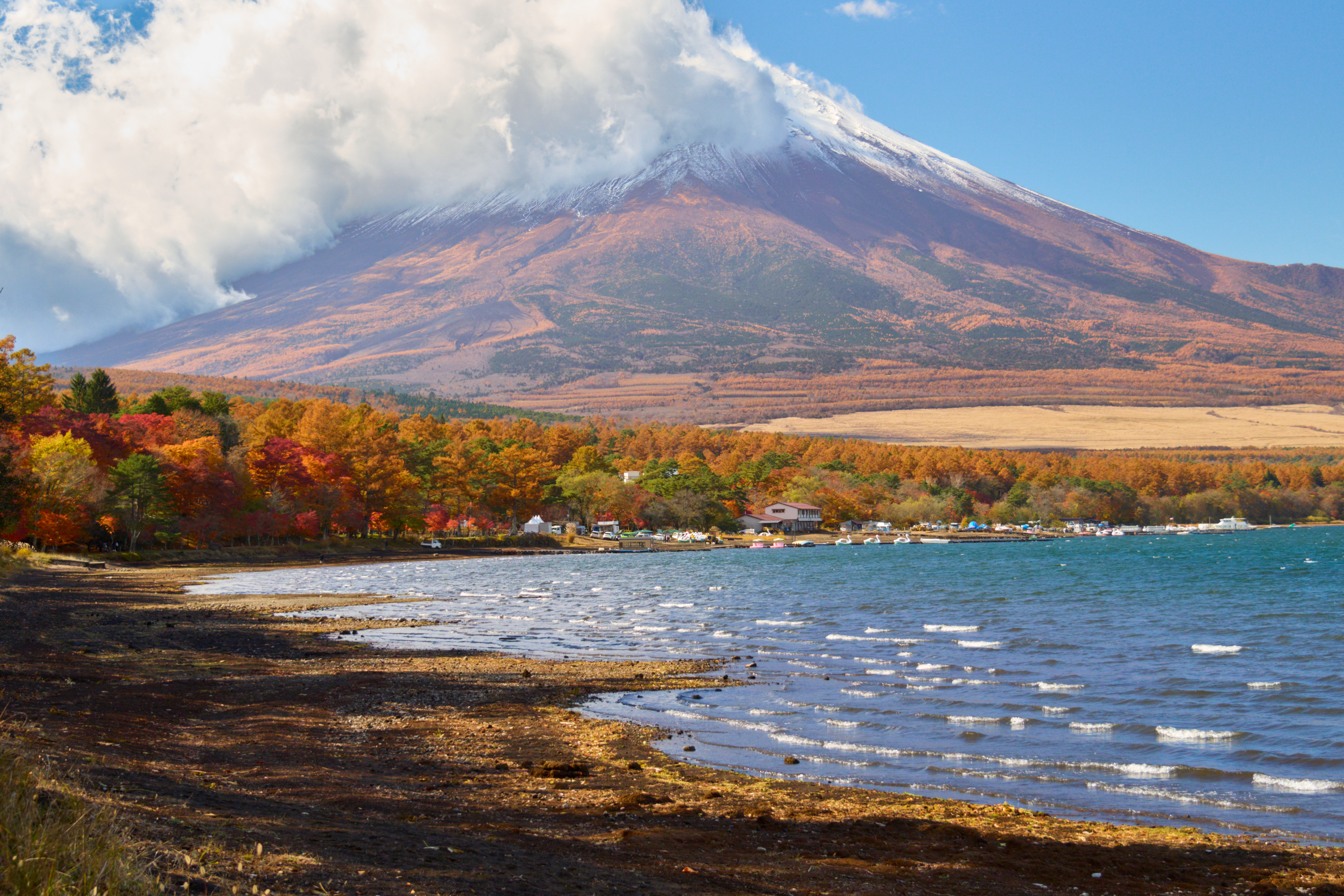
Mount Fuji viewed from the shore of Lake Yamanaka during autumn foliage season.

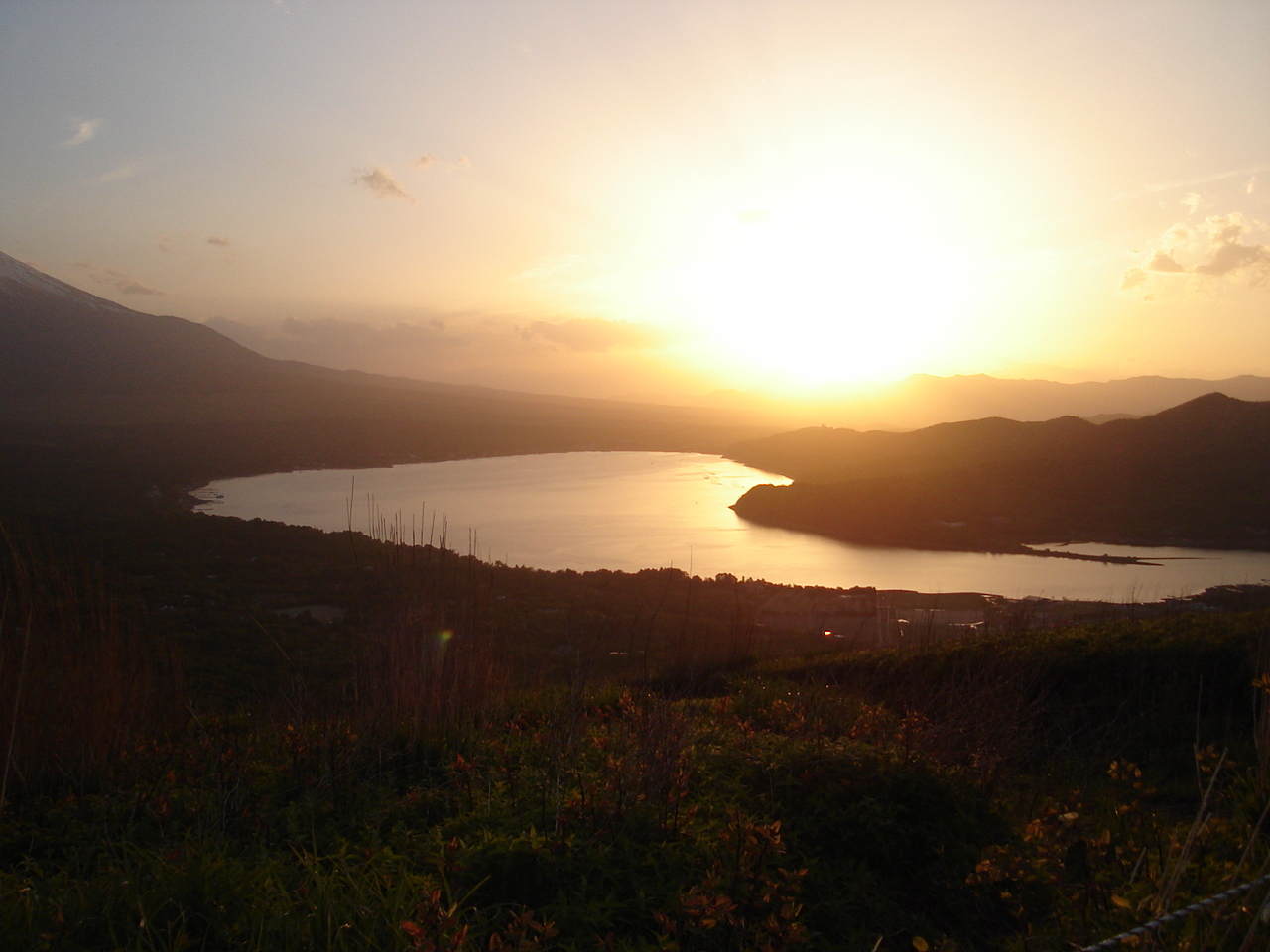
Sunset at Lake Yamanaka

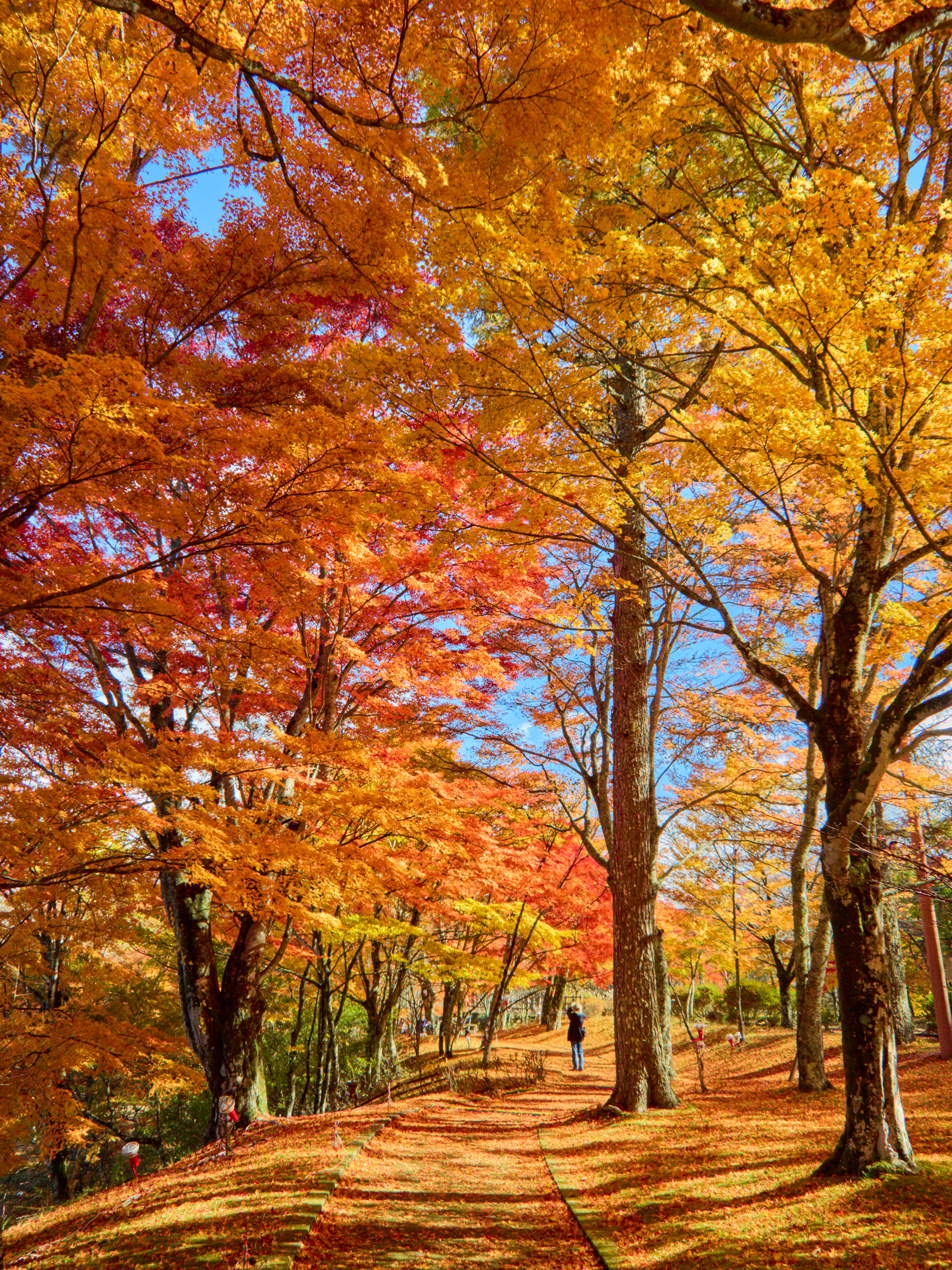
A tree-lined path through a deciduous forest in peak autumn foliage at Yamanakako.

Several views of Lake Yamanaka on a sunny day.

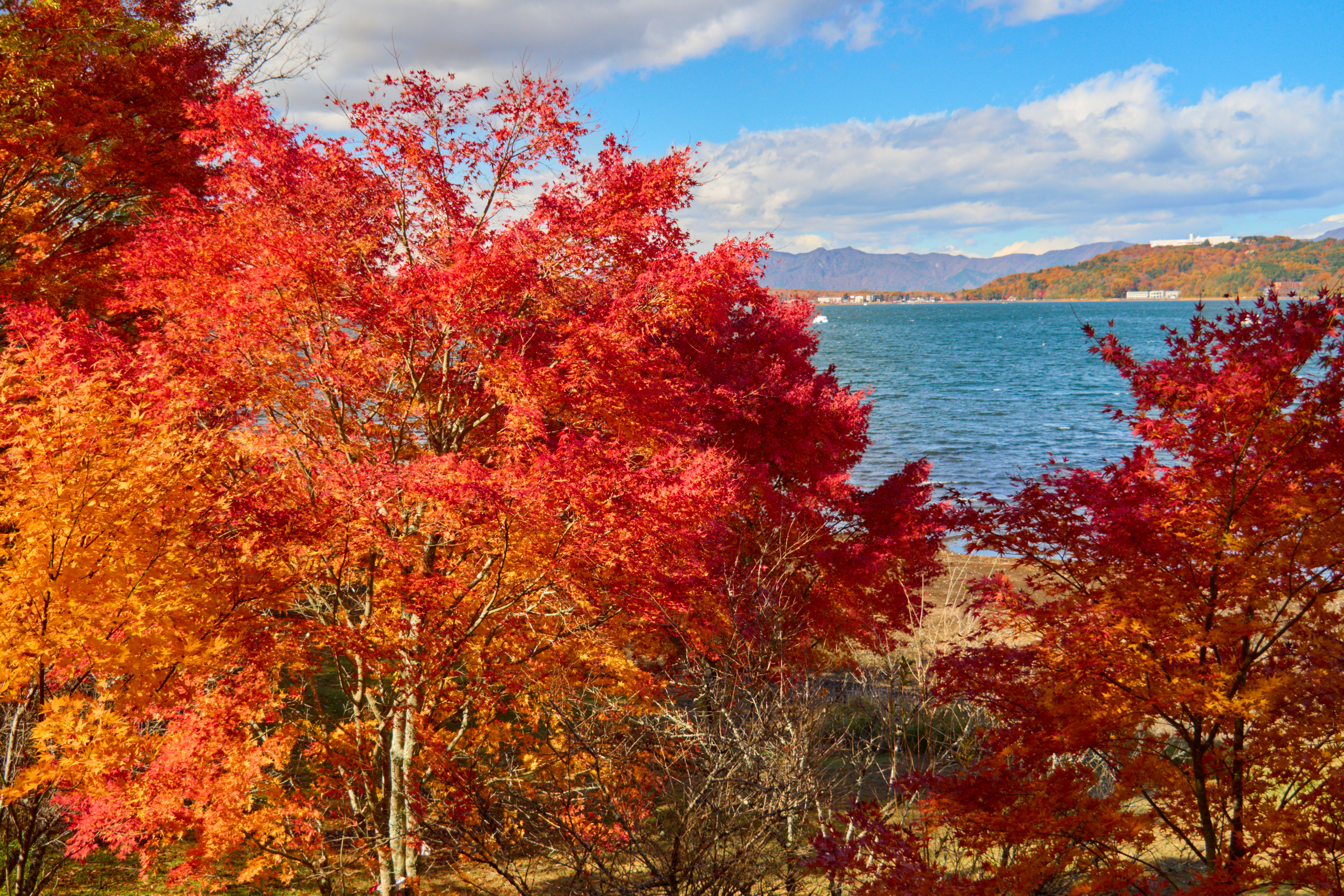
Autumn foliage along the shore of Lake Yamanakako, with the lake and hills visible in the background.

== See also ==
- Fuji Five Lakes
- Fuji-Hakone-Izu National Park
