= Kawaguchiko Station =

Railway station in Fujikawaguchiko, Yamanashi Prefecture, Japan

Kawaguchiko Station 河口湖駅
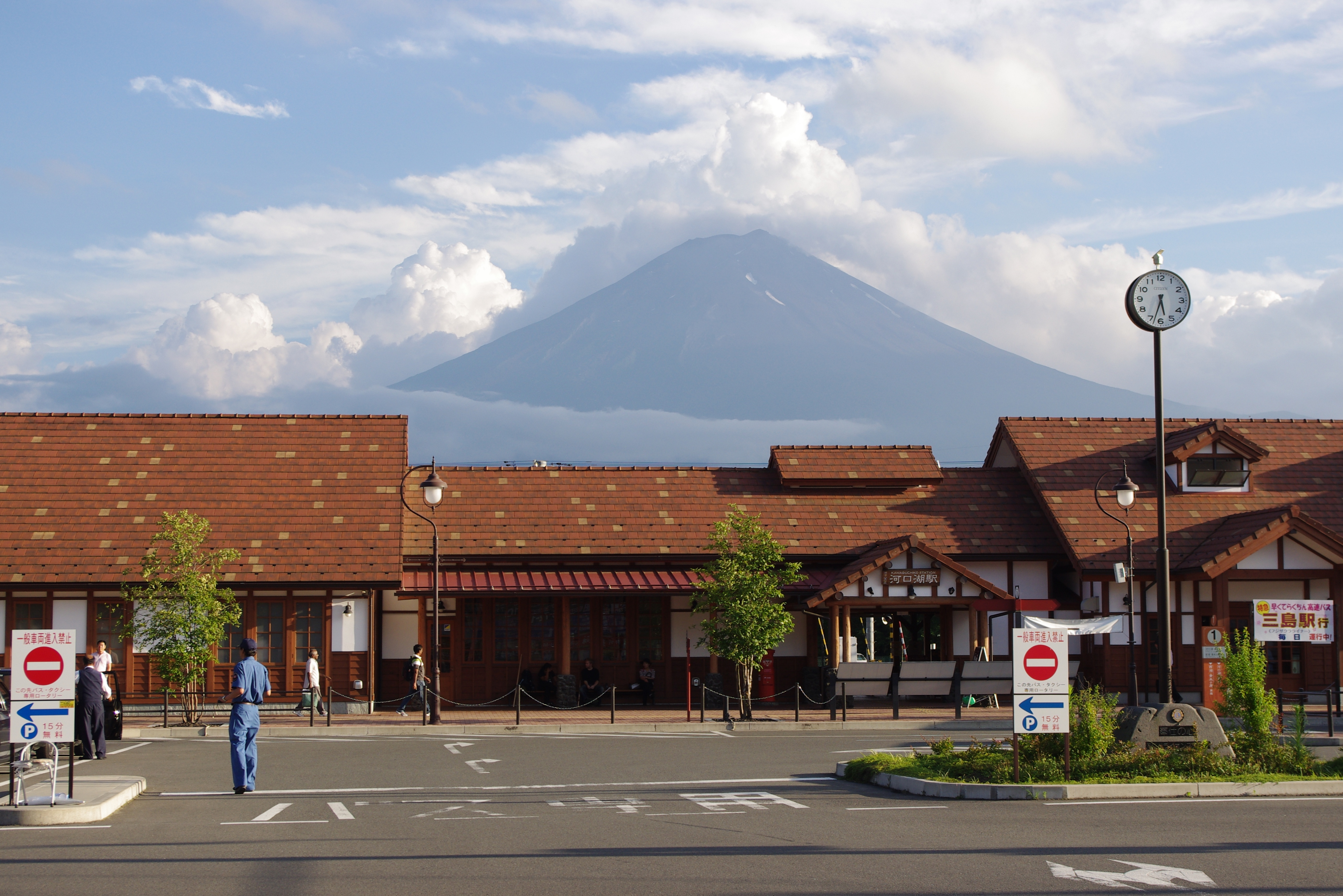
- Kawaguchiko Station with Mount Fuji behind, July 2010

General information
- Location: 3641 Funatsu, Fujikawaguchiko-machi, Minamitsuru-gun, Yamanashi-ken; Japan
- Coordinates: 35°29′54″N 138°46′07″E
- Elevation: 857 m (2,812 ft)
- Operator: Fuji Kyuko
- Line: ■ Fujikyuko Line
- Distance: 26.6 km from Ōtsuki
- Platforms: 2 island platforms
- Connections: Bus terminal

Other information
- Status: Staffed
- Station code: FJ18
- Website: Official website

History
- Opened: 24 August 1950

Passengers
- FY2015: 2,903 daily

Services
Preceding station	Fuji Kyuko	Following station
Terminus	Fuji Excursion	Fujikyu-Highland towards Shinjuku
Terminus	Fujikyuko Line Fujisan Tokkyū Fuji Tozan Densha Local	Fujikyu-Highland towards Ōtsuki
Location
- Location within Yamanashi Prefecture Location within Japan

Kawaguchiko Station (河口湖駅, Kawaguchiko-eki) is a railway station on the Fujikyuko Line in Fujikawaguchiko, Yamanashi, Japan, operated by Fuji Kyuko (Fujikyu). It is located at an altitude of 857 metres (2,812 ft).

== Lines ==
Kawaguchiko Station forms the terminus of the 26.6 km (16.5 mi) privately operated Fujikyuko Line from Ōtsuki.

== Station layout ==
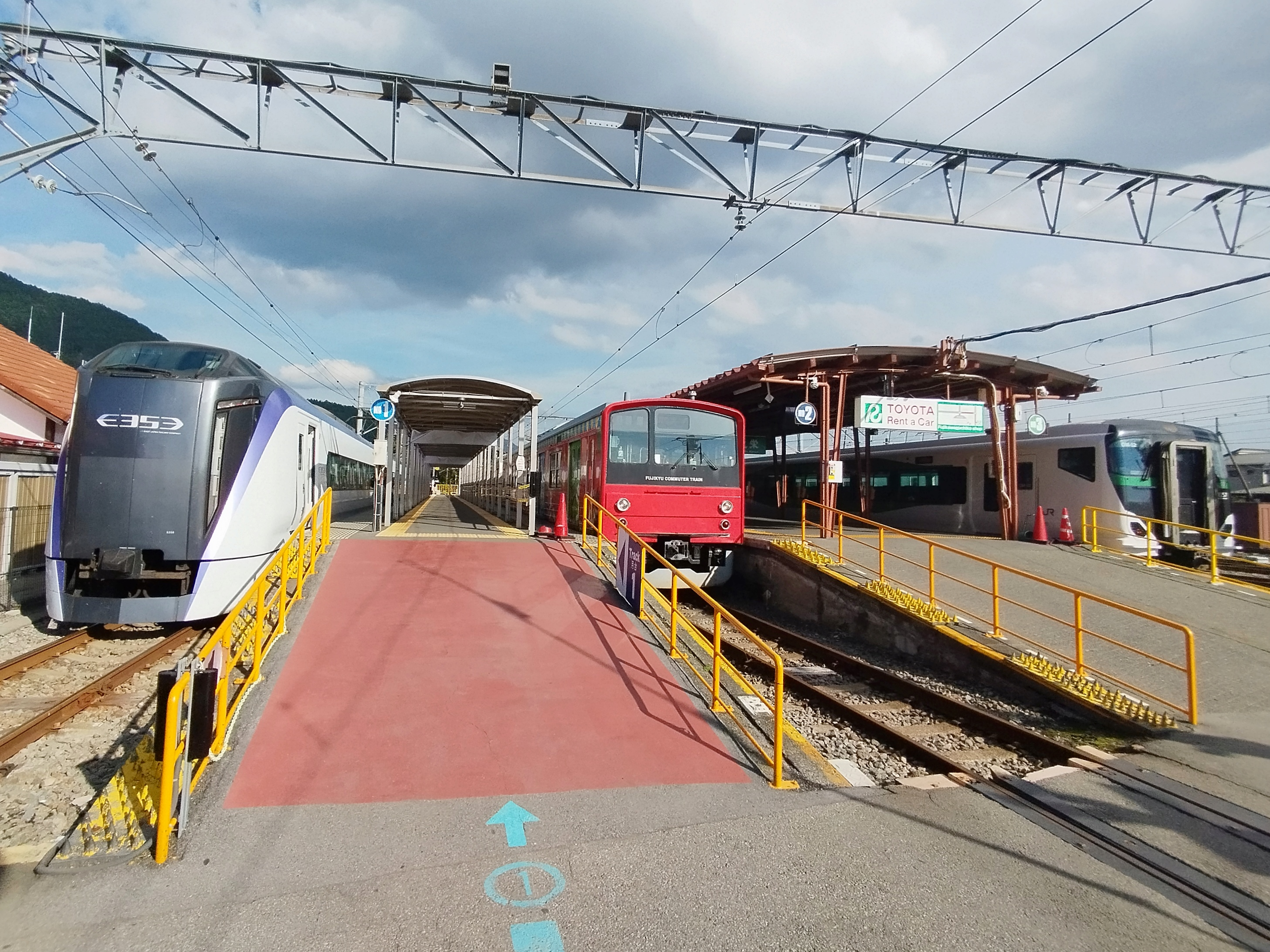
Platforms of Kawaguchiko station

The station is staffed and consists of two island platforms serving three tracks, numbered 1 to 3. Passengers access the platforms via a level crossing. It has waiting rooms and toilet facilities. The station is staffed.

== History ==
Kawaguchiko Station opened on 24 August 1950. A new station building was completed on 24 March 2006.

== Passenger statistics ==
In fiscal 2015, the station was used by an average of 2903 passengers daily.

== Surrounding area ==
- Lake Kawaguchi
- Tenjō-Yama Park Mt. Kachi Kachi Ropeway
- Funatsu Elementary School
- National Route 137

== Bus services ==
- For Mount Fuji 5th stage
- For Mishima Station (transfer for Tokaido Shinkansen)
- For Gotemba Station and Gotemba Premium Outlets via Oshino and Lake Yamanaka
- For Fujisan Station via Fuji-Q Highland
- For Shin-Fuji Station (transfer for Tokaido Shinkansen) via Lake Motosu and Fujinomiya Station
- For Kofu Station via Isawa-onsen Station
- For Shinjuku Station, Tokyo Station, Haneda Airport, Shibuya Station, Minami-ōsawa Station, Center-Kita Station, Machida Station, Yokohama Station, Kaihimmakuhari Station, Fujisawa Station, Kōzu Station, Ōmiya Station, Shibukawa, Matsumoto Bus Terminal, Kanazawa Station, Shizuoka Station, Nagoya Station, Takayama Station, Ōsaka Abenobashi Station, and Hakata Station (Highway Bus)
