= Inaji =

Japanese limited express train service

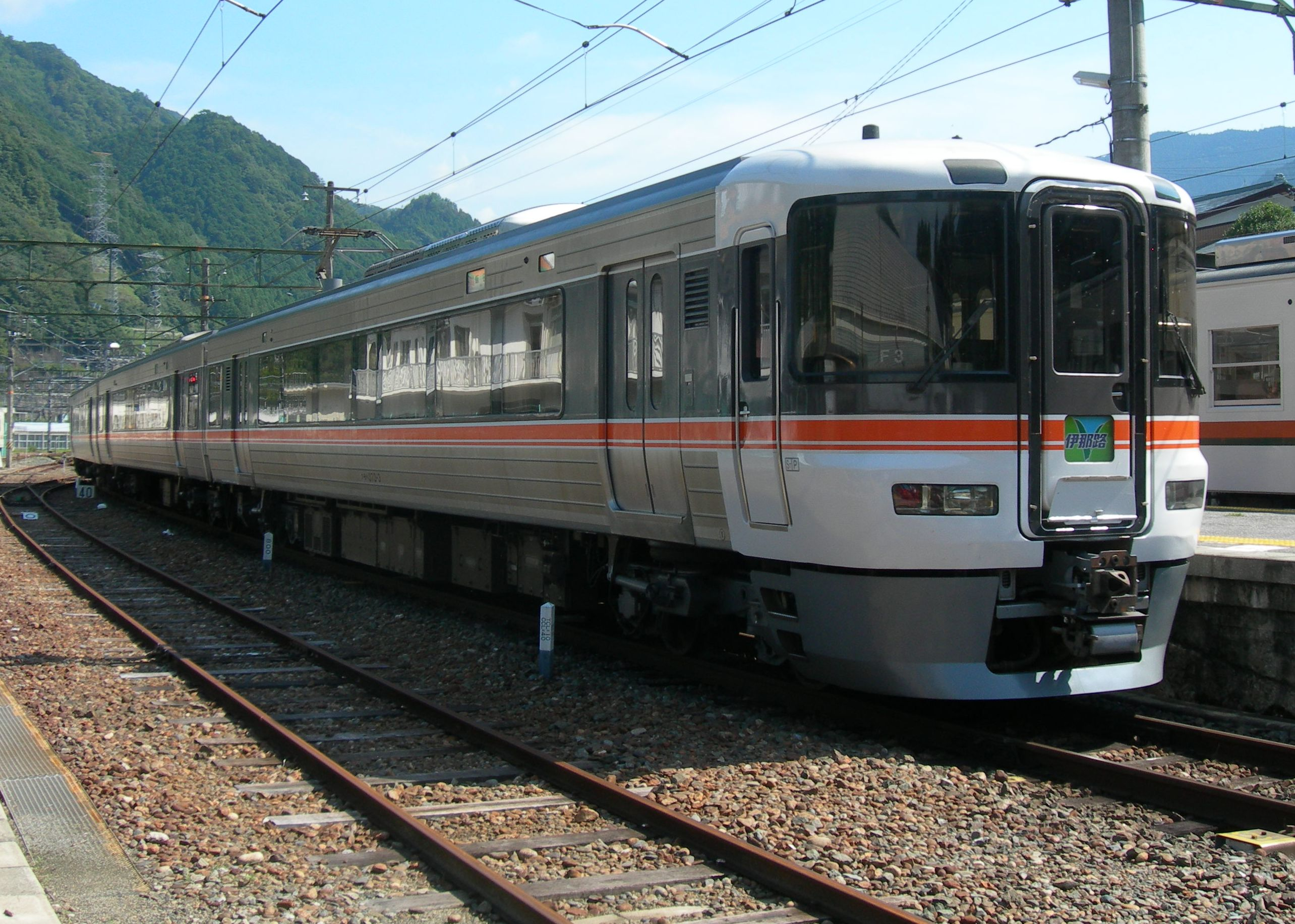
- 373 series EMU on an Inaji service at Chūbu-Tenryū

Overview
- Service type: Limited Express
- Status: Operational
- First service: 1992 (Express); 1996 (Limited express)
- Current operator: JR Central

Route
- Termini: Toyohashi; Iida
- Stops: 11
- Distance travelled: 129.3 km (80.3 mi)
- Average journey time: 2 hours 40 minutes approx
- Service frequency: 2 return workings daily
- Line used: Iida Line

On-board services
- Class: Standard only
- Disabled access: Yes
- Other facilities: Toilets

Technical
- Rolling stock: 373 series EMU
- Electrification: 1,500 V DC
- Operating speed: 85 km/h (53 mph)
- Track owner: JR Central

The Inaji (伊那路) is a limited express train service operated in Japan by Central Japan Railway Company (JR Central), which runs between Toyohashi and Iida on the Iida line. It began operation as an express service in 1992, and as a limited express service in 1996. Like other JR Central limited express services, the service is branded Wide View Inaji.

== History ==
The first Inaji service ran in March 1992 as an express service. It was upgraded in March 1996 to limited express status, and in July of the same year, the service was rebranded as Wide View Inaji.

In 2007, all services became completely non-smoking.

In September 2013, service was suspended due to Typhoon Man-yi. Service resumed on October 10 of the same year.

== Stations stopped ==
Trains stop at the following stations:

Toyohashi - Toyokawa - Shinshiro - Hon-Nagashino - Yuya-Onsen - Chūbu-Tenryū - Misakubo - Hiraoka - Nukuta - Tenryūkyō - Iida

== Service ==
Like all JR Central limited express trains, a limited express fee has to be paid, on top of the normal fee to ride this service. Services are formed of 3-car 373 series EMUs. There are 2 return workings a day, with the journey time taking approximately 2 hours and 40 minutes from Toyohashi to Iida. Trains operate at a maximum speed of 85 km/h (53 mph). Both Toyohashi bound services are timetabled to connect with a Tokyo bound Hikari service on the Tōkaidō Shinkansen.

== Facilities ==
Only standard class is available on this service. Cars 2 and 3 (Toyohashi end) are unreserved, while seats can be reserved in car 1 (Iida end) for an additional fee. There are no catering facilities available. There are toilets on this train.
