= Ohara Tunnel =

Railway tunnel in Honshu, Japan

Ohara Railway Tunnel
- Route map of Iida Line
- Interactive map of Ohara Railway Tunnel

Overview
- Line: Iida Line
- Location: between Misakubo Station and Ōzore Station
- Coordinates: 35°10′54.1842″N 137°50′33.2736″E
- Status: active

Operation
- Opened: 1955
- Operator: Central Japan Railway Company
- Traffic: Railway
- Character: Passenger and Freight

Technical
- Line length: 5,063 m (16,611 ft)
- No. of tracks: 2

Ohara Tunnel (大原トンネル, Ohara tonneru) is a tunnel on Iida Line that runs from Misakubo Station and Ōzore Station in Hamamatsu city, Shizuoka Prefecture with total length of 5.063 km. It was built and completed in 1955.

== See also ==
- List of tunnels in Japan
- Seikan Tunnel undersea tunnel between Honshu-Hokkaido islands
- Kanmon Railway Tunnel undersea tunnel between Honshu-Kyushu islands
- Sakhalin–Hokkaido Tunnel
- Bohai Strait tunnel
