= Shironishi Station =

Railway station in Hamamatsu, Japan

Shironishi Station 城西駅
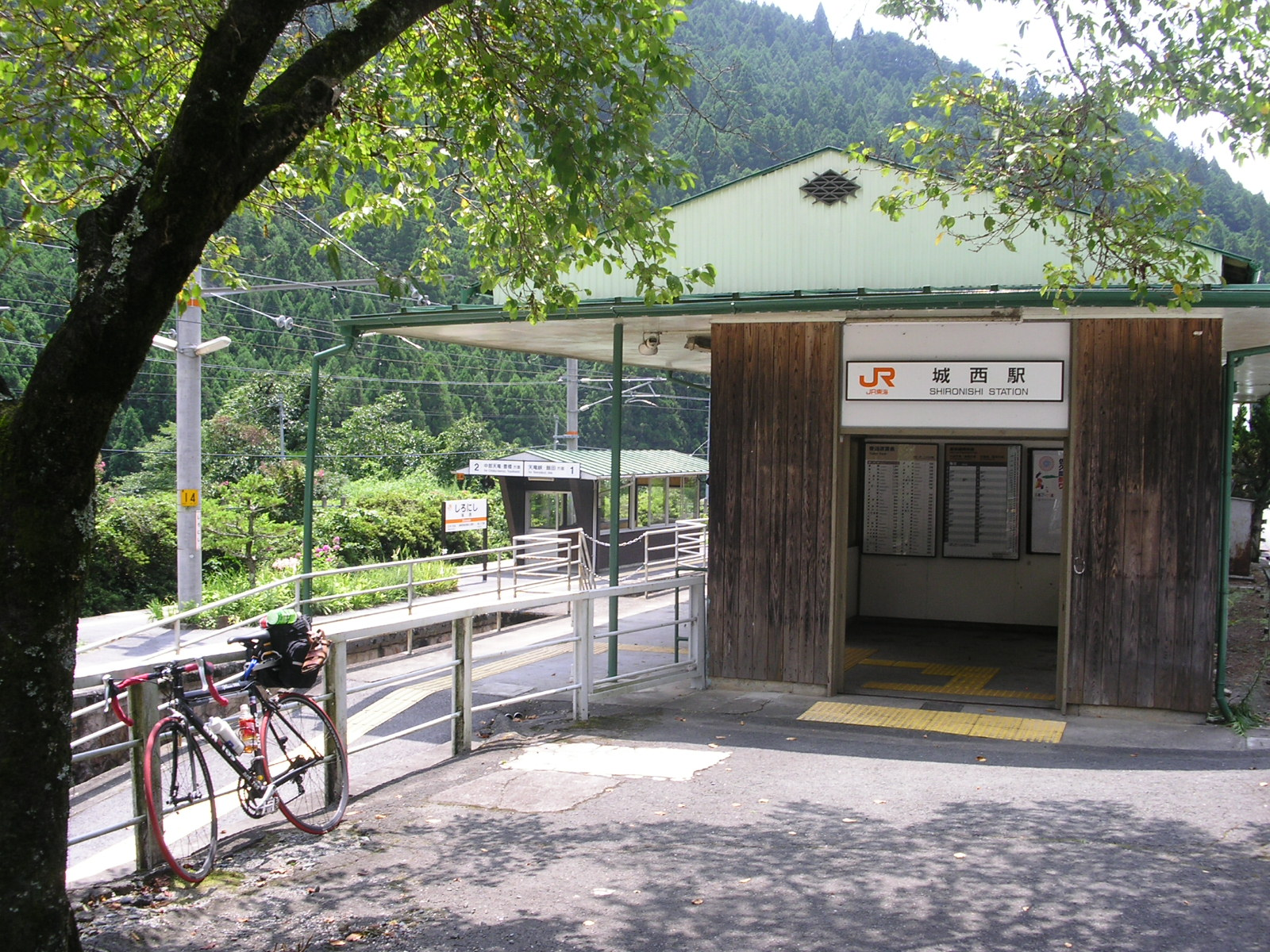
- Shironishi Station in August 2004

General information
- Location: Sakuma-cho, Aijiki, Tenryū-ku, Hamamatsu-shi, Shizuoka-ken; Japan
- Coordinates: 35.131842°N 137.862056°E
- Operator: JR Central
- Line: Iida Line
- Distance: 70.5 km from Toyohashi
- Platforms: 1 side platform

Other information
- Status: Unstaffed

History
- Opened: November 11, 1955

Passengers
- FY2017: 19 (daily)
Location
- Location within Shizuoka Prefecture Location within Japan

Shironishi Station (城西駅, Shironishi-eki) is a railway station on the Iida Line in Tenryū-ku, Hamamatsu, Shizuoka Prefecture, Japan, operated by Central Japan Railway Company (JR Central).

== Lines ==
Shironishi Station is served by the Iida Line and is 70.5 kilometers from the starting point of the line at Toyohashi Station.

== Station layout ==
The station has one ground-level side platform serving a single bi-directional track, with a small wooden station building. Until 2008, the station had a single island platform, but was rebuilt in 2008. The station is not attended.

== Adjacent stations ==
«	Service	»
Iida Line
Limited Express "Inaji" (特急「伊那路」): Does not stop at this station
Aizuki	Local (普通)	Mukaichiba

== Station history ==
Shironishi Station was established on November 11, 1955, as a station on Japan National Railway (JNR), when the Iida line between Sakuma Station and Ōzore Station was rerouted to avoid the rising waters of the Sakuma Dam. Freight services were discontinued in 1974. The station has been unstaffed since 1984. Along with its division and privatization of JNR on April 1, 1987, the station came under the control and operation of the Central Japan Railway Company.

== Passenger statistics ==
In fiscal 2016, the station was used by an average of 19 passengers daily (boarding passengers only).

== Surrounding area ==
- National Route 152

== See also ==
- List of railway stations in Japan
