= Mukaichiba Station =

Railway station in Hamamatsu, Japan

Mukaichiba Station 向市場駅
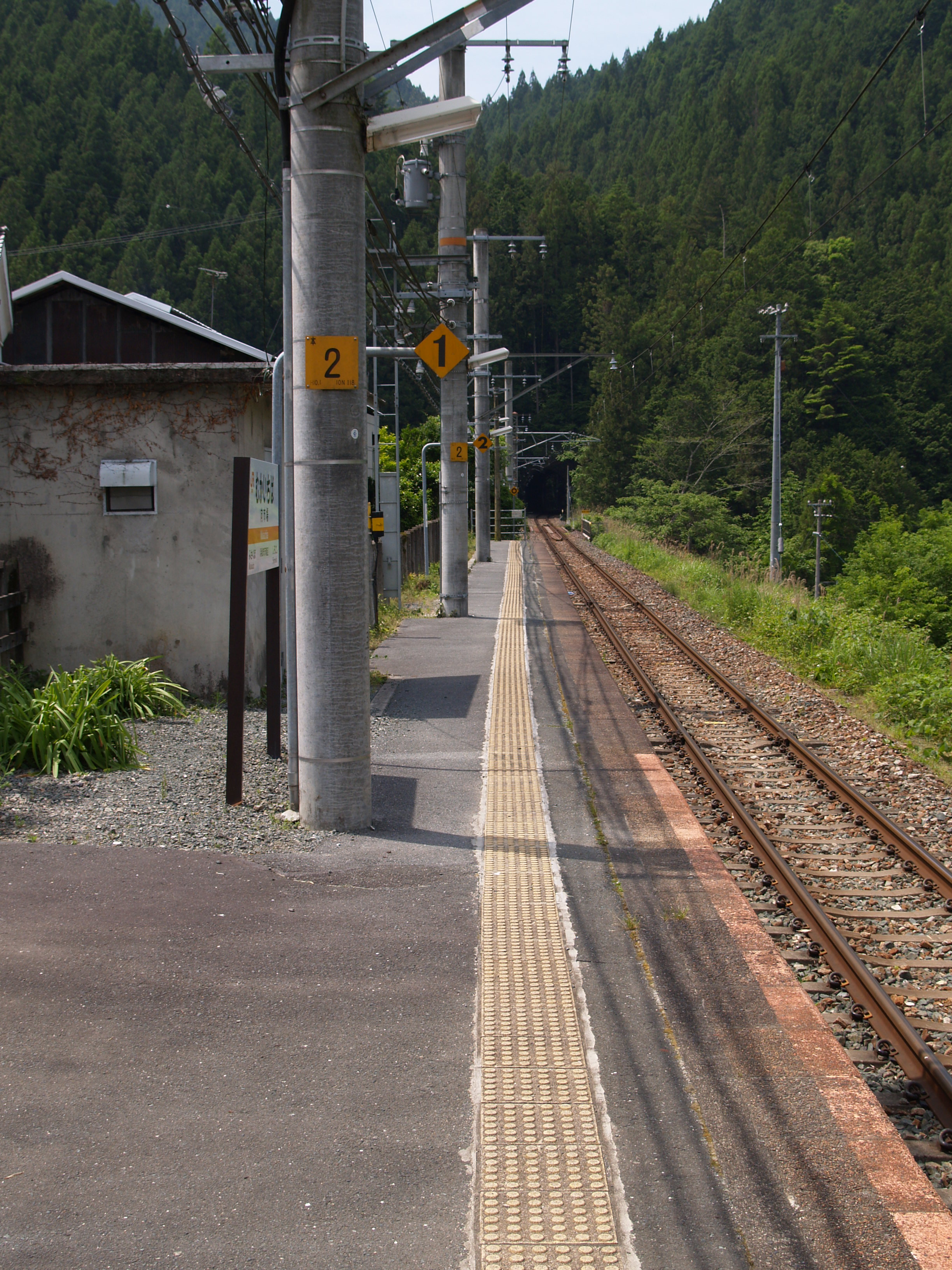
- Mukaichiba Station in May 2010

General information
- Location: Misakubo-cho Jitogata 230, Tenryū-ku, Hamamatsu-shi, Shizuoka-ken; Japan
- Coordinates: 35.154303°N 137.869534°E
- Operator: JR Central
- Line: Iida Line
- Distance: 73.3 km from Toyohashi
- Platforms: 1 side platform

Other information
- Status: Unstaffed

History
- Opened: November 11, 1955

Passengers
- FY2017: 9 (daily)
Location
- Location within Shizuoka Prefecture Location within Japan

Mukaichiba Station (向市場駅, Mukaichiba-eki) is a railway station on the Iida Line in Tenryū-ku, Hamamatsu, Shizuoka Prefecture, Japan, operated by Central Japan Railway Company (JR Central).

== Lines ==
Mukaichiba Station is served by the Iida Line and is 73.3 kilometers from the starting point of the line at Toyohashi Station.

== Station layout ==
The station has one ground-level side platform serving a single bi-directional track. There is no station building. The station is not attended.

== Adjacent stations ==
«	Service	»
Iida Line
Limited Express "Inaji" (特急「伊那路」): Does not stop at this station
Shironishi	Local (普通)	Misakubo

== Station history ==
Mukaichiba Station was established on November 11, 1955 as a passenger station on Japan National Railway (JNR), when the Iida line between Sakuma Station and Ōzore Station was rerouted to avoid the rising waters of the Sakuma Dam. Along with its division and privatization of JNR on April 1, 1987, the station came under the control and operation of the Central Japan Railway Company.

== Passenger statistics ==
In fiscal 2016, the station was used by an average of 9 passengers daily (boarding passengers only).

== Surrounding area ==
- Mizukubo Junior High School

== See also ==
- List of railway stations in Japan
