= Tenryūkyō Station =

Railway station in Iida, Nagano Prefecture, Japan

Tenryūkyō Station 天竜峡駅
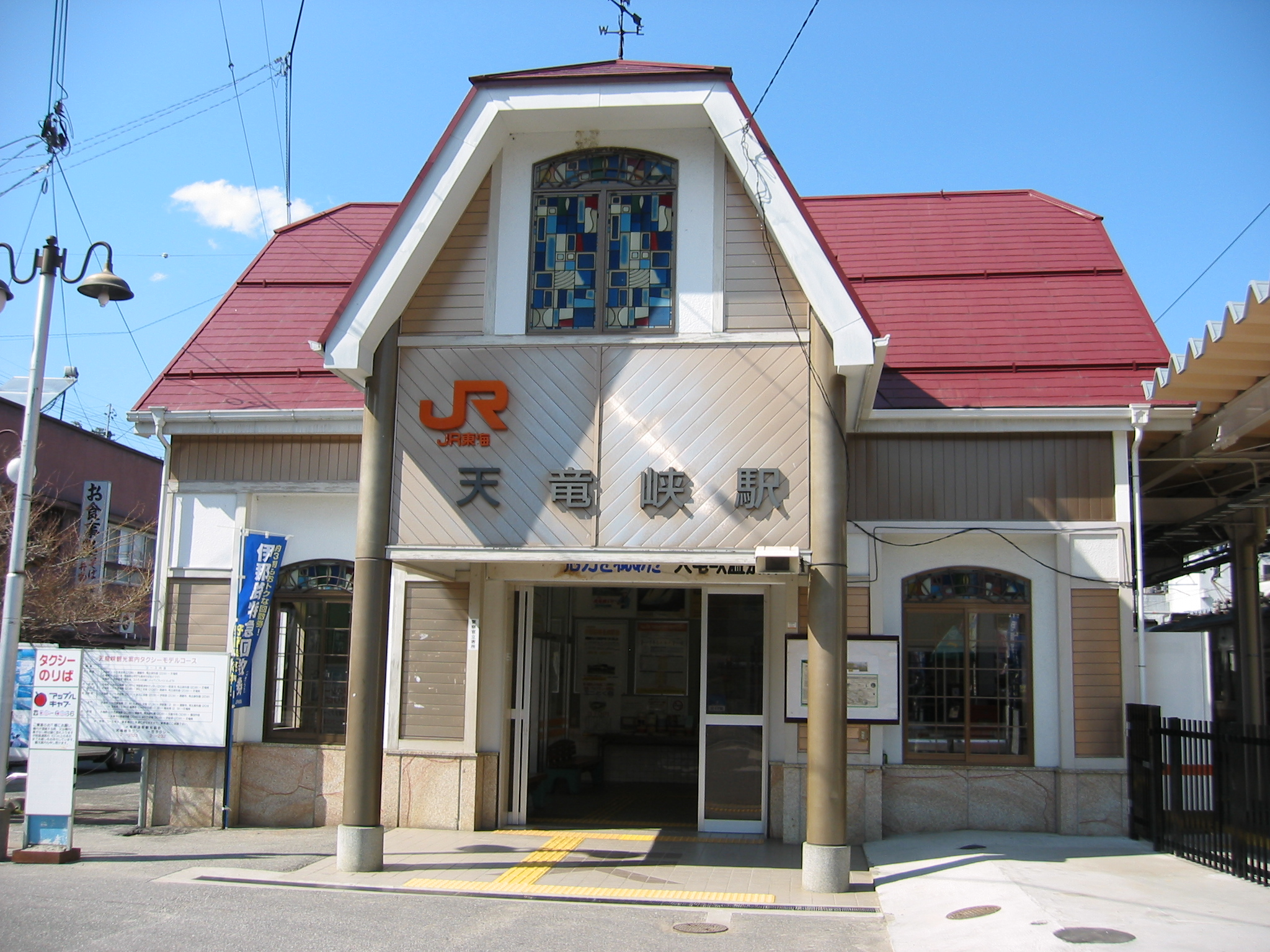
- Tenryūkyō Station in March 2006

General information
- Location: 4744 Kawaji-Tenryūkyō, Iida-shi, Nagano-ken 399-2431; Japan
- Coordinates: 35.4407°N 137.8174°E
- Elevation: 382 meters
- Operator: JR Central
- Line: Iida Line
- Distance: 116.2 km from Toyohashi
- Platforms: 1 side + 1 island platform

Other information
- Status: Staffed

History
- Opened: 16 December 1927

Passengers
- FY2015: 319 daily
Location
- Location within Nagano Prefecture Location within Japan

Tenryūkyō Station (天竜峡駅, Tenryūkyō-eki) is a railway station on the Iida Line in the city of Iida, Nagano Prefecture, Japan, operated by Central Japan Railway Company (JR Central).

== Lines ==
Tenryūkyō Station is served by the Iida Line and is 116.2 kilometers from the starting point of the line at Toyohashi Station.

== Station layout ==
The station consists of a ground-level side platform and a ground-level island platform connected by a level crossing. The station is staffed.

=== Platforms ===
1	■ Iida Line	for Iida and Tatsuno for Chūbu-Tenryū and Toyohashi
2	■ Iida Line	for Iida and Tatsuno for Chūbu-Tenryū and Toyohashi
3	■ Iida Line	for starting trains

== Adjacent stations ==
«	Service	»
Iida Line
Nukuta	Limited Express Inaji	Iida
Chiyo	Local	Kawaji

== History ==
Tenryūkyō Station opened on 16 December 1927. With the privatization of Japanese National Railways (JNR) on 1 April 1987, the station came under the control of JR Central.

== Passenger statistics ==
In fiscal 2015, the station was used by an average of 319 passengers daily (boarding passengers only).

== Surrounding area ==
- Tenryū River
- Tenryū-kyō

== See also ==
- List of railway stations in Japan
