= Sakuramachi Station (Nagano) =

Railway station in Iida, Nagano Prefecture, Japan

Sakuramachi Station 桜町駅
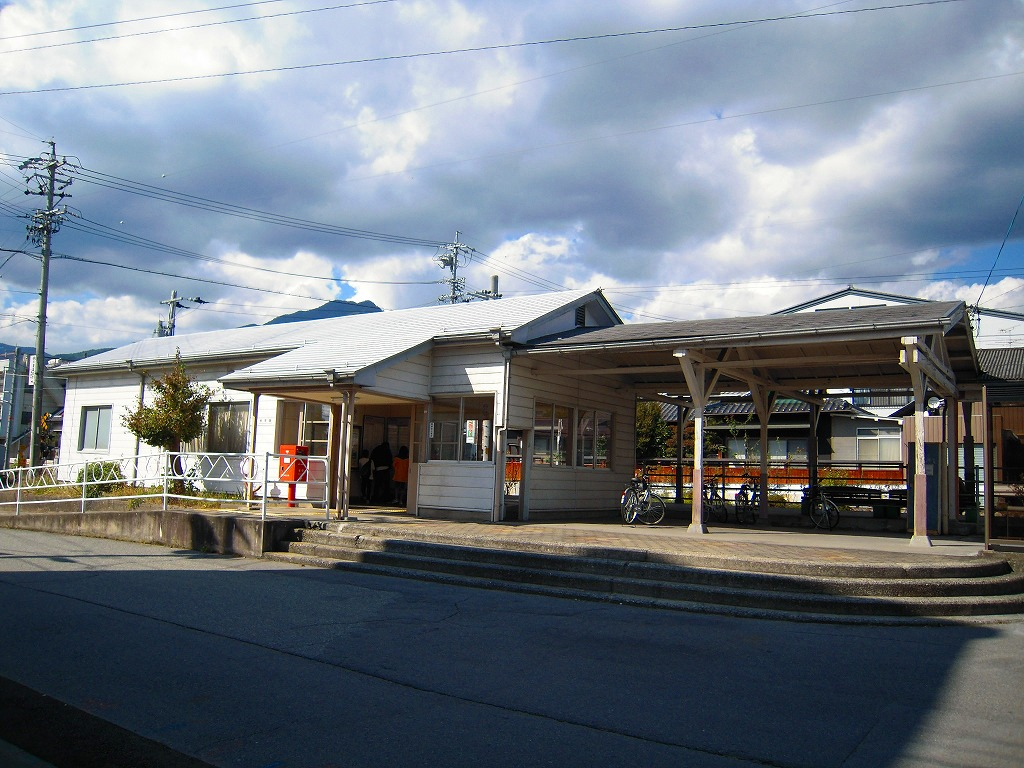
- Sakuramachi Station in October 2009

General information
- Location: 2-50 Sakuramachi, Iida-shi, Nagano-ken 395-0014; Japan
- Coordinates: 35°31′20″N 137°49′46″E
- Elevation: 520.0 meters
- Operator: JR Central
- Line: Iida Line
- Distance: 130.1 km from Toyohashi
- Platforms: 1 side platform

Other information
- Status: Unstaffed

History
- Opened: 3 August 1923

Passengers
- FY2015: 97
Location
- Location within Nagano Prefecture Location within Japan

Sakuramachi Station (桜町駅, Sakuramachi-eki) is a railway station on the Iida Line in the city of Iida, Nagano Prefecture, Japan, operated by Central Japan Railway Company (JR Central).

== Lines ==
Sakuramachi Station is served by the Iida Line and is 130.1 kilometers from the starting point of the line at Toyohashi Station.

== Station layout ==
The station consists of a single ground-level side platform serving one bi-directional track. There is no station building, but only a platform built on top of the platform. The station is unattended.

== Adjacent stations ==
«	Service	»
Iida Line
Rapid Misuzu: Does not stop at this station
Iida	Local	Ina-Kamisato

== History ==
Sakuramachi Station opened on 3 August 1923. With the privatization of Japanese National Railways (JNR) on 1 April 1987, the station came under the control of JR Central.

== Passenger statistics ==
In fiscal 2015, the station was used by an average of 97 passengers daily (boarding passengers only).

== Surrounding area ==
- Iida Prefectural Fuetsu High School
- Iida Police Station

== See also ==
- List of railway stations in Japan
