= Misakubo Station =

Railway station in Hamamatsu, Japan

Misakubo Station 水窪駅
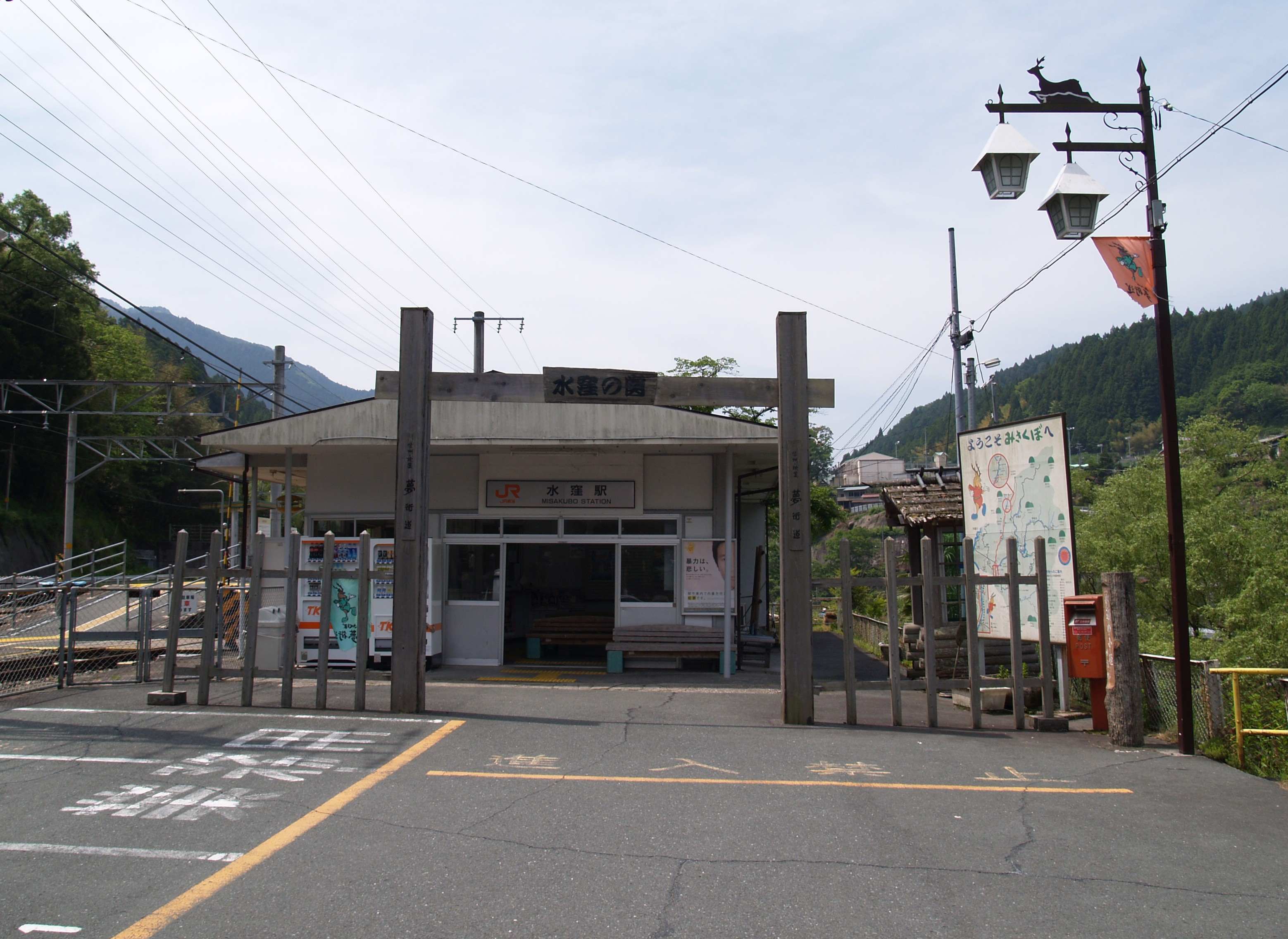
- Misakubo Station in May 2010

General information
- Location: Misakubo-cho Jitogata 973, Tenryū-ku, Hamamatsu-shi, Shizuoka-ken; Japan
- Coordinates: 35.163871°N 137.870460°E
- Operator: JR Central
- Line: Iida Line
- Distance: 74.3 km from Toyohashi
- Platforms: 1 island platform

Other information
- Status: Unstaffed

History
- Opened: November 11, 1955

Passengers
- FY2017: 52 (daily)
Location
- Location within Shizuoka Prefecture Location within Japan

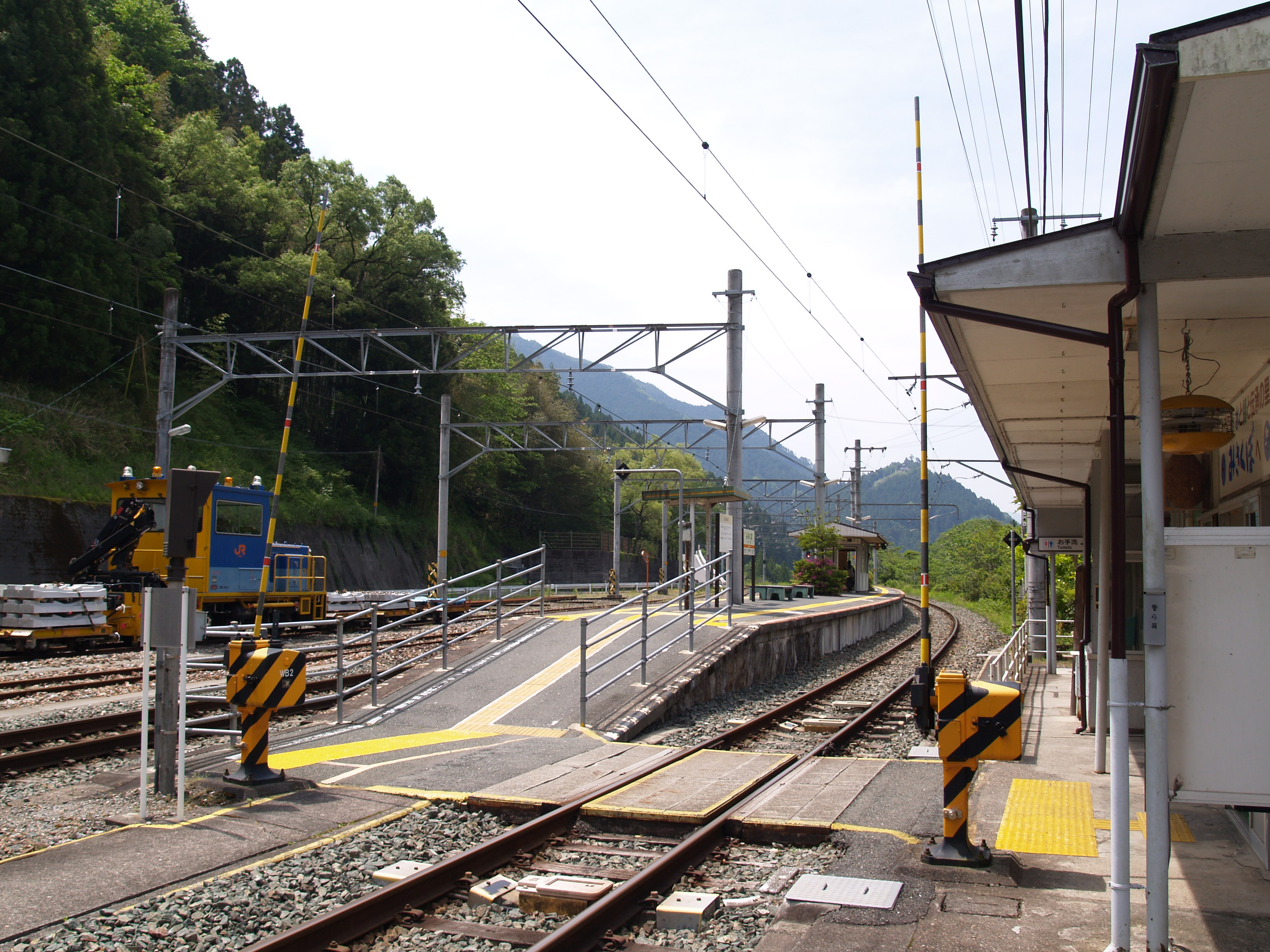
Platform

Misakubo Station (水窪駅, Misakubo-eki) is a railway station on the Iida Line in Tenryū-ku, Hamamatsu, Shizuoka Prefecture, Japan, operated by Central Japan Railway Company (JR Central).

== Lines ==
Misakubo Station is served by the Iida Line and is 74.3 kilometers from the starting point of the line at Toyohashi Station.

== Station layout ==
The station has one ground-level island platform connected to a small station building by a level crossing. The station also has a head shunt to permit the passage of express trains. The station is unattended.

=== Platforms ===
1	■ Iida Line	For Iida
2	■ Iida Line	For Toyohashi

== Adjacent stations ==
«	Service	»
Iida Line
Chūbu-Tenryū	Limited Express "Inaji" (特急「伊那路」)	Hiraoka
Mukaichiba	Local (普通)	Ōzore

== History ==
Misakubo Station was established on November 11, 1955 as a station on Japan National Railway (JNR), when the Iida line between Sakuma Station and Ōzore Station was rerouted to avoid the rising waters of the Sakuma Dam. All freight services were discontinued in 1984. Along with the division and privatization of JNR on April 1, 1987, the station came under the control and operation of the Central Japan Railway Company.

== Passenger statistics ==
In fiscal 2016, the station was used by an average of 52 passengers daily (boarding passengers only).

== Surrounding area ==
- National Route 152

== See also ==
- List of railway stations in Japan
