= Aizuki Station =

Railway station in Hamamatsu, Japan

Aizuki Station 相月駅
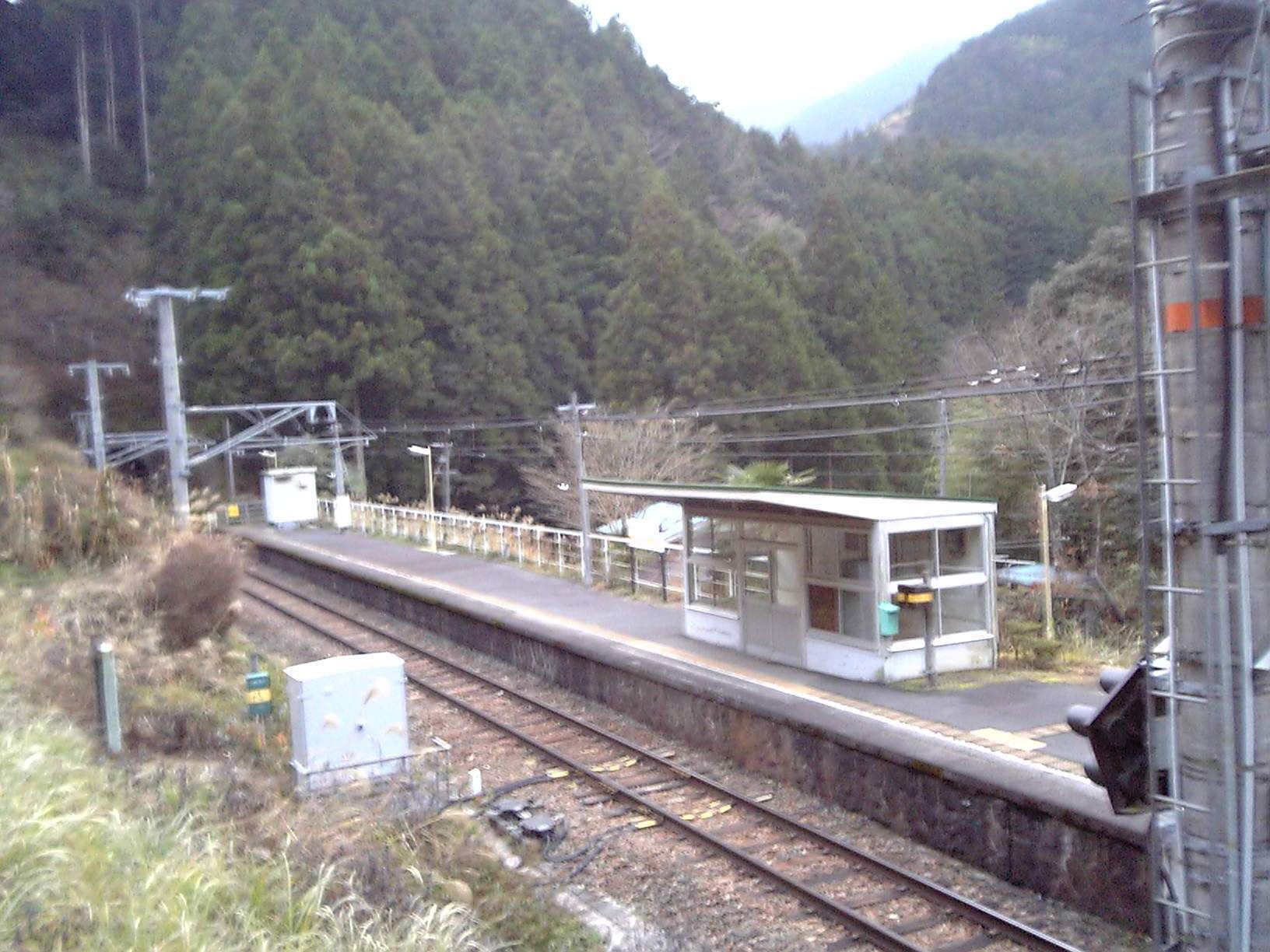
- Aizuki Station in December 2009

General information
- Location: 883 Sakuma-cho Aizuki, Tenryū-ku, Hamamatsu-shi, Shizuoka-ken; Japan
- Coordinates: 35.114997°N 137.854294°E
- Operator: JR Central
- Line: Iida Line
- Distance: 68.5 km from Toyohashi
- Platforms: 1 side platform

Other information
- Status: Unstaffed

History
- Opened: November 11, 1955

Passengers
- FY2017: 7 (daily)
Location
- Location within Shizuoka Prefecture Location within Japan

Aizuki Station (相月駅, Aizuki-eki) is a railway station on the Iida Line in Tenryū-ku, Hamamatsu, Shizuoka Prefecture, Japan, operated by Central Japan Railway Company (JR Central).

== Lines ==
Aizuki Station is served by the Iida Line and is 68.5 kilometers from the starting point of the line at Toyohashi Station.

== Station layout ==
The station has one ground-level side platform serving a single bi-directional track, with a small wooden station building. The station is located in a valley between two tunnels. The station is not attended.

== Adjacent stations ==
«	Service	»
Iida Line
Limited Express "Inaji" (特急「伊那路」): Does not stop at this station
Sakuma	Local	Shironishi

== History ==
Aizuki Station opened on November 11, 1955. Along with its division and privatization of JNR on April 1, 1987, the station came under the control and operation of the Central Japan Railway Company.

== Passenger statistics ==
In fiscal 2016, the station was used by an average of 7 passengers daily (boarding passengers only).

== Surrounding area ==
The station is located in an isolated rural area.

== See also ==
- List of railway stations in Japan
