= Shimokawai Station =

Railway station in Hamamatsu, Japan

Shimokawai Station 下川合駅
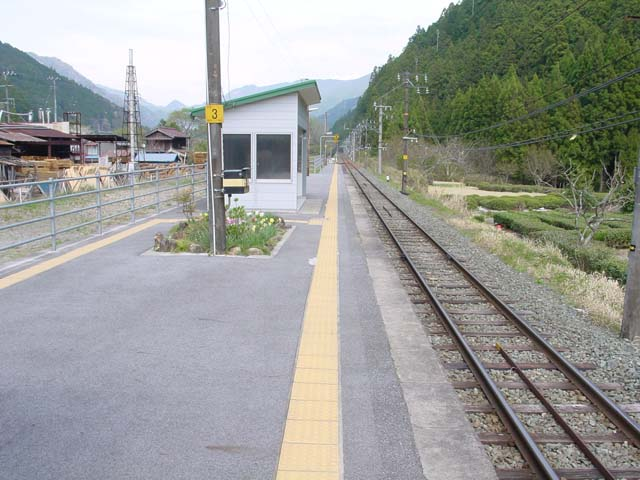
- Shimokawai Station in October 2007

General information
- Location: Sakuma-cho, Kawai 595, Tenryū-ku, Hamamatsu-shi, Shizuoka-ken; Japan
- Coordinates: 35.06925°N 137.786253°E
- Operator: JR Central
- Line: Iida Line
- Distance: 59.9 km from Toyohashi
- Platforms: 1 side platform

Other information
- Status: Unstaffed

History
- Opened: November 11, 1934

Passengers
- FY2017: 15 (daily)
Location
- Location within Shizuoka Prefecture Location within Japan

Shimokawai Station (下川合駅, Shimokawai-eki) is a railway station on the Iida Line in Tenryū-ku, Hamamatsu, Shizuoka Prefecture, Japan, operated by Central Japan Railway Company (JR Central).

== Lines ==
Shimokawai Station is served by the Iida Line and is 59.9 kilometers from the starting point of the line at Toyohashi Station.

== Station layout ==
The station has one ground-level side platform serving a single bi-directional track, with a small waiting room built onto the platform. It formerly had a single island platform, but was rebuilt in 2008. The station is unattended.

== Adjacent stations ==
«	Service	»
Iida Line
Limited Express "Inaji" (特急「伊那路」): Does not stop at this station
Hayase	Local (普通)	Chūbu-Tenryū

== Station history ==
Shimokawai Station was established on November 11, 1934. On August 1, 1943, the Sanshin Railway was nationalized along with several other local lines to form the Iida line. All freight services were discontinued in 1971. Along with its division and privatization of JNR on April 1, 1987, the station came under the control and operation of the Central Japan Railway Company.

== Passenger statistics ==
In fiscal 2016, the station was used by an average of 15 passengers daily (boarding passengers only).

== Surrounding area ==
- National Route 473

== See also ==
- List of railway stations in Japan
