= Iida Line =

Railway line in Japan

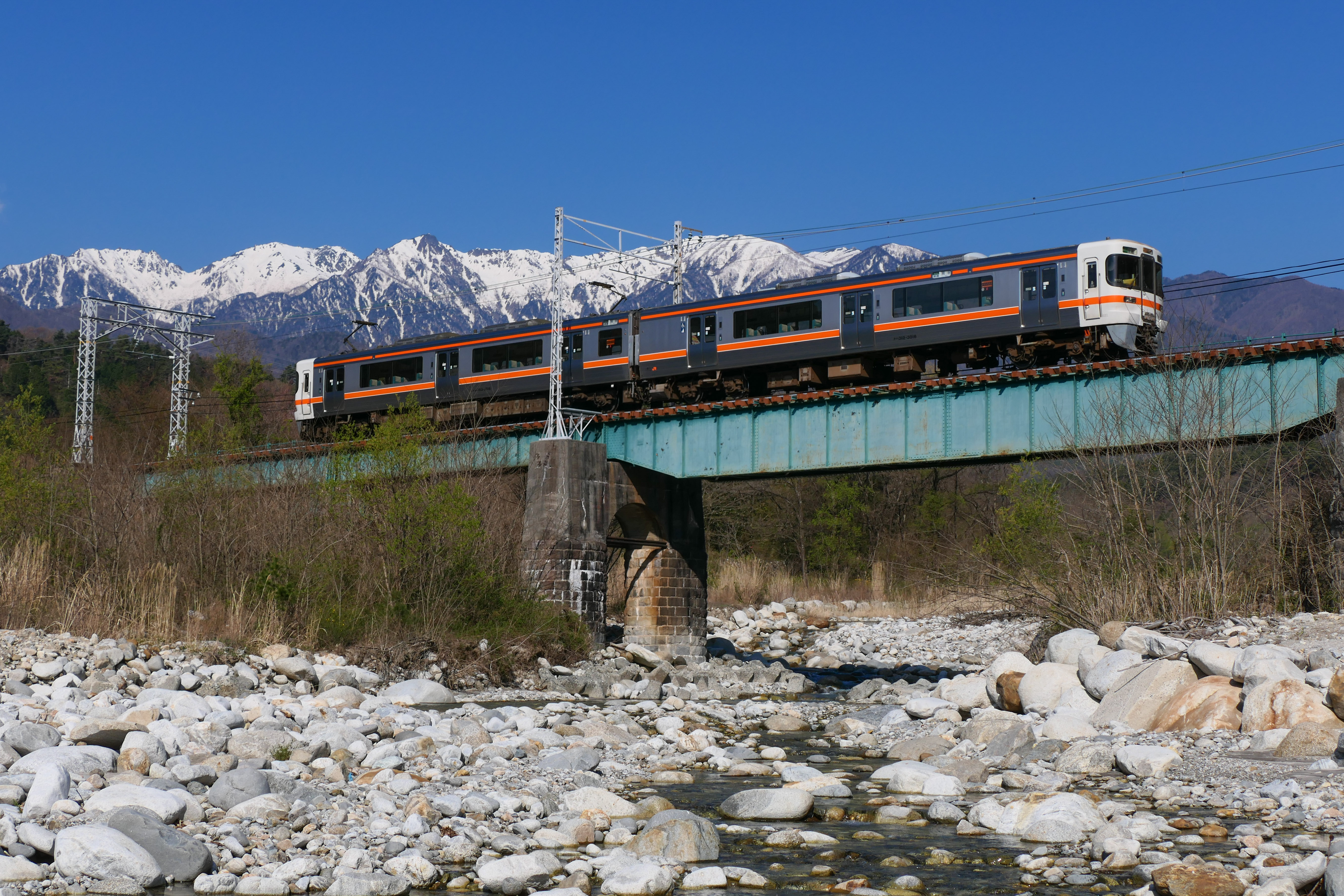
- JR Central 313 Series train crossing the Nakatagiri River

Overview
- Owner: JR Central
- Locale: Aichi, Shizuoka, Nagano prefectures
- Termini: Toyohashi; Tatsuno (through to Okaya)
- Stations: 94

Service
- Type: Heavy rail

History
- Opened: 15 July 1897; 128 years ago
- Last extension: 20 August 1937; 88 years ago

Technical
- Line length: 195.7 km (121.6 mi)
- Track gauge: 1,067 mm (3 ft 6 in)
- Electrification: 1,500 V DC (overhead catenary)
- Operating speed: 85 km/h (53 mph) (maximum); 40–50 km/h (25–31 mph) (curves); 25–35 km/h (16–22 mph) (diverging junctions)
- Train protection system: ATS-PT
- Maximum incline: 4.0%
Route map

The Iida Line (飯田線, Iida-sen) is a Japanese railway line connecting Toyohashi Station in Toyohashi, Aichi with Tatsuno Station in Tatsuno, Nagano, operated by Central Japan Railway Company (JR Central). The line links eastern Aichi Prefecture and southern Nagano Prefecture through northwestern Shizuoka Prefecture. It goes through steep mountains as well as cities such as Iida and Ina. The line was originally of four different private railway lines, the first of which opened in 1897.

The line has an unusually high number of so-called Hikyō stations, or hikyo-eki, which have since lost their nearby communities due to depopulation. There are 94 total stations along the route. A number of these stations have become Hikyō stations over the years. The line has been described as the "holy land for those who love touring hikyo-eki". The phrase was coined in 1999 by Takanobu Ushiyama and friends, for railroad stations that are isolated and little used.

For a distance of 187 km (116 mi) between Toyokawa and Tatsuno the Iida Line does not intersect with any other railway line.

== Services ==
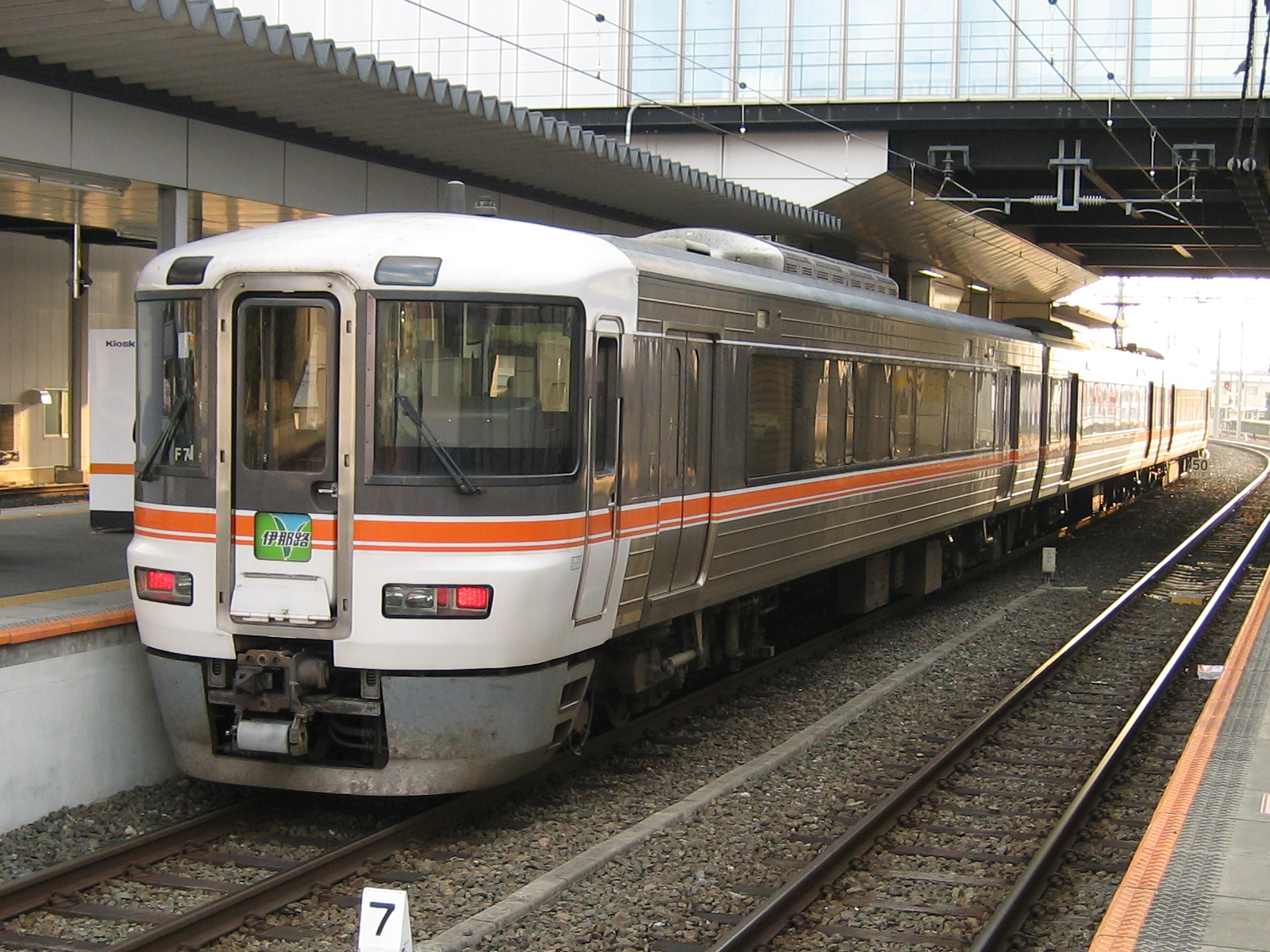
Limited express Inaji

As of January 2026, the following train services operate on the Iida Line:

The limited express Inaji (伊那路) operates two round trips per day between Toyohashi and Iida. The rapid Misuzu (みすず) runs one round trip per day between Iida, Tatsuno and Nagano (operating a through service on the Chūō Main Line (Tatsuno Branch), Chūō Main Line, Shinonoi Line & Shin'etsu Main Line).

Local service frequency changes multiple times along the line. From Toyohashi a 15-minute frequency operates as far as Toyokawa, approximately half-hourly as far as Shinshiro and hourly as far as Hon-Nagashino. Between Hon-Nagashino and Tenryūkyō (a mountainous area with few passengers) services operate every 1-3 hours. North of Tenryūkyō services generally operate approximately hourly, with some sections having 30-minute frequencies in peak times. At Tatsuno, almost all trains continue to/from Okaya on the Chūō Main Line (Tatsuno Branch).

Traveling the entire length of the 195.7 km (121.6 mi) line by local train takes over six hours and generally requires changing trains one or more times. There are only two northbound and three southbound trains per day that operate the entire length of the line between Toyohashi and Tatsuno, with all of them continuing to/from Okaya (one of the southbound trains commences at Kami-Suwa).

As of 2025, the Iida Line hosts the longest local train service in Japan - the 14:38 train from Toyohashi arrives at Okaya at 21:37 with a running time of 6 hours 59 minutes (419 minutes) for the 96-station journey.

== Stations ==
=== From Toyohashi to Iida ===
L: Local (普通, Futsū)
R: Rapid (快速, Kaisoku)
I: Limited Express Inaji (特急伊那路, Tokkyū Inaji)

All trains stop at stations marked "●" and pass stations marked "-", "↓", or "↑". Arrows indicate the direction of rapid trains. Some trains stop at stops marked "▲".

No.	Station	Japanese	Distance (km)	L	R		I	Transfers	Location	
Iida Line
CD00	Toyohashi	豊橋	0.0	●	●	●	●	Tōkaidō Main Line Tōkaidō Shinkansen ■ Meitetsu Nagoya Line ■ Toyotetsu Atsumi Line (Shin-Toyohashi) ■ Azumada Main Line (Ekimae)	Toyohashi	Aichi
CD01	Funamachi	船町	1.5	▲	↑	↑	-		Toyohashi	Aichi
CD02	Shimoji	下地	2.2	▲	↑	↑	-		Toyohashi	Aichi
	Hirai Junction	平井信号場	3.9	-	↑	↑	-		Toyokawa	Aichi
CD03	Kozakai	小坂井	4.4	●	●	●	-		Toyokawa	Aichi
CD04	Ushikubo	牛久保	6.6	●	●	●	-		Toyokawa	Aichi
CD05	Toyokawa	豊川	8.7	●	●	●	●	■ Meitetsu Toyokawa Line (Toyokawa-Inari)	Toyokawa	Aichi
	Mikawa-Ichinomiya	三河一宮	12.0	●	●	●	-		Toyokawa	Aichi
	Nagayama	長山	14.4	●	●	↑	-		Toyokawa	Aichi
	Ejima	江島	15.4	●	●	↑	-		Toyokawa	Aichi
	Tōjō	東上	17.0	●	●	↑	-		Toyokawa	Aichi
	Nodajō	野田城	19.7	●	●	↑	-		Shinshiro	Aichi
	Shinshiro	新城	21.6	●	●	●	●		Shinshiro	Aichi
	Higashi-Shimmachi	東新町	22.6	●	●		-		Shinshiro	Aichi
	Chausuyama	茶臼山	23.8	●	●		-		Shinshiro	Aichi
	Mikawa-Tōgō	三河東郷	25.0	●	●		-		Shinshiro	Aichi
	Ōmi	大海	27.9	●	●		-		Shinshiro	Aichi
	Torii	鳥居	29.3	●	↑		-		Shinshiro	Aichi
	Nagashinojō	長篠城	30.8	●	↑		-		Shinshiro	Aichi
	Hon-Nagashino	本長篠	32.1	●	●		●		Shinshiro	Aichi
	Mikawa-Ōno	三河大野	35.6	●	●		-		Shinshiro	Aichi
	Yuya-Onsen	湯谷温泉	38.0	●	●		●		Shinshiro	Aichi
	Mikawa-Makihara	三河槙原	40.6	●	●		-		Shinshiro	Aichi
	Kakidaira	柿平	42.9	▲	↑		-		Shinshiro	Aichi
	Mikawa-Kawai	三河川合	45.2	●	●		-		Shinshiro	Aichi
	Ikeba	池場	50.1	▲	↑		-		Shinshiro	Aichi
	Tōei	東栄	51.2	●	●		-		Tōei, Kitashitara District	Aichi
	Izumma	出馬	55.4	▲	↑		-		Tenryū-ku, Hamamatsu	Shizuoka
	Kamiichiba	上市場	56.0	●	↑		-		Tenryū-ku, Hamamatsu	Shizuoka
	Urakawa	浦川	57.3	●	●		-		Tenryū-ku, Hamamatsu	Shizuoka
	Hayase	早瀬	58.5	●	↑		-		Tenryū-ku, Hamamatsu	Shizuoka
	Shimokawai	下川合	59.9	●	↑		-		Tenryū-ku, Hamamatsu	Shizuoka
	Chūbu-Tenryū	中部天竜	62.4	●	●		●		Tenryū-ku, Hamamatsu	Shizuoka
	Sakuma	佐久間	63.5	●	●		-		Tenryū-ku, Hamamatsu	Shizuoka
	Aizuki	相月	68.5	●	↑		-		Tenryū-ku, Hamamatsu	Shizuoka
	Shironishi	城西	70.5	●	↑		-		Tenryū-ku, Hamamatsu	Shizuoka
	Mukaichiba	向市場	73.3	●	↑		-		Tenryū-ku, Hamamatsu	Shizuoka
	Misakubo	水窪	74.3	●	●		●		Tenryū-ku, Hamamatsu	Shizuoka
	Ōzore	大嵐	80.8	●	↑		-		Tenryū-ku, Hamamatsu	Shizuoka
	Kowada	小和田	83.8	●	↑		-		Tenryū-ku, Hamamatsu	Shizuoka
	Nakaisamurai	中井侍	87.8	●	↑		-		Tenryū, Shimoina District	Nagano
	Ina-Kozawa	伊那小沢	90.1	●	↑		-		Tenryū, Shimoina District	Nagano
	Ugusu	鶯巣	91.7	●	↑		-		Tenryū, Shimoina District	Nagano
	Hiraoka	平岡	93.8	●	●		●		Tenryū, Shimoina District	Nagano
	Shiteguri	為栗	98.5	▲	●		-		Tenryū, Shimoina District	Nagano
	Nukuta	温田	102.2	●	●		●		Yasuoka, Shimoina District	Nagano
	Tamoto	田本	104.2	▲	●		-		Yasuoka, Shimoina District	Nagano
	Kadoshima	門島	107.9	●	●		-		Yasuoka, Shimoina District	Nagano
	Karakasa	唐笠	111.3	●	●		-		Yasuoka, Shimoina District	Nagano
	Kinno	金野	113.6	▲	●		-		Iida	Nagano
	Chiyo	千代	114.8	●	●		-		Iida	Nagano
	Tenryūkyō	天竜峡	116.2	●	●		●		Iida	Nagano
	Kawaji	川路	117.5	●	●		-		Iida	Nagano
	Tokimata	時又	119.3	●	●		-		Iida	Nagano
	Dashina	駄科	121.1	●	●		-		Iida	Nagano
	Kega	毛賀	122.5	●	●		-		Iida	Nagano
	Ina-Yawata	伊那八幡	123.6	●	●		-		Iida	Nagano
	Shimoyamamura	下山村	124.7	●	●		-		Iida	Nagano
	Kanae	鼎	125.7	●	●		-		Iida	Nagano
	Kiriishi	切石	127.7	●	●		-		Iida	Nagano
	Iida	飯田	129.3	●	●		●		Iida	Nagano

=== From Iida to Okaya ===
L: Local (普通, Futsū)
R: Rapid (快速, Kaisoku)
M: Rapid Misuzu (快速みすず, Kaisoku Misuzu)

All trains stop at stations marked "●" and pass stations marked "-", "↓", or "↑". Arrows also indicate the directions the rapid trains run.

Station	Japanese	Distance (km)	L	R		M	Transfers	Location	
Iida Line
Iida	飯田	129.3	●	●		●		Iida	Nagano
Sakuramachi	桜町	130.1	●	●		▲		Iida	Nagano
Ina-Kamisato	伊那上郷	131.1	●	●		▲		Iida	Nagano
Motozenkōji	元善光寺	133.8	●	●		●		Iida	Nagano
Shimoichida	下市田	135.6	●	●		-		Takamori, Shimoina District	Nagano
Ichida	市田	136.8	●	●		●		Takamori, Shimoina District	Nagano
Shimodaira	下平	139.5	●	●		-		Takamori, Shimoina District	Nagano
Yamabuki	山吹	140.5	●	●		-		Takamori, Shimoina District	Nagano
Ina-Ōshima	伊那大島	143.1	●	●		●		Matsukawa, Shimoina District	Nagano
Kamikatagiri	上片桐	146.9	●	●		●		Matsukawa, Shimoina District	Nagano
Ina-Tajima	伊那田島	148.2	●	●		-		Nakagawa, Kamiina District	Nagano
Takatōbara	高遠原	150.7	●	●		-		Iijima, Kamiina District	Nagano
Nanakubo	七久保	152.3	●	●		●		Iijima, Kamiina District	Nagano
Ina-Hongō	伊那本郷	155.1	●	●		▲		Iijima, Kamiina District	Nagano
Iijima	飯島	157.9	●	●		●		Iijima, Kamiina District	Nagano
Tagiri	田切	160.1	●	●		-		Iijima, Kamiina District	Nagano
Ina-Fukuoka	伊那福岡	162.9	●	●		●		Komagane	Nagano
Komachiya	小町屋	164.4	●	●		-		Komagane	Nagano
Komagane	駒ヶ根	165.6	●	●	●	●		Komagane	Nagano
Ōtagiri	大田切	167.0	●		↓	▼		Komagane	Nagano
Miyada	宮田	169.1	●		●	●		Miyada, Kamiina District	Nagano
Akagi	赤木	170.4	●		↓	▼		Ina	Nagano
Sawando	沢渡	173.4	●		●	●		Ina	Nagano
Shimojima	下島	174.5	●		↓	▼		Ina	Nagano
Inashi	伊那市	178.0	●		●	●		Ina	Nagano
Ina-Kita	伊那北	178.9	●		●	●		Ina	Nagano
Tabata	田畑	181.0	●		↓	▼		Minamiminowa, Kamiina District	Nagano
Kitatono	北殿	183.2	●		●	●		Minamiminowa, Kamiina District	Nagano
Kinoshita	木ノ下	185.6	●		↓	●		Minowa, Kamiina District	Nagano
Ina-Matsushima	伊那松島	187.1	●		●	●		Minowa, Kamiina District	Nagano
Sawa	沢	189.7	●		●	●		Minowa, Kamiina District	Nagano
Haba	羽場	191.6	●		●	●		Tatsuno, Kamiina District	Nagano
Ina-Shimmachi	伊那新町	193.4	●		●	▼		Tatsuno, Kamiina District	Nagano
Miyaki	宮木	194.6	●		↓	●		Tatsuno, Kamiina District	Nagano
Tatsuno	辰野	195.7	●		●	●	Chūō Main Line (Tatsuno Branch)	Tatsuno, Kamiina District	Nagano
Chūō Main Line (Tatsuno Branch)
Kawagishi	川岸	201.7	●		●	●		Okaya	Nagano
Okaya	岡谷	205.2	●		●	●	Chūō Main Line	Okaya	Nagano

== Rolling stock ==
- 211 series 3-car EMUs (from 15 March 2015, on JR East inter-running services)
- 213-5000 series 2-car EMUs
- 313-3000 series EMUs
- 373 series 3-car EMUs (on Inaji limited express and some all-stations "Local" services)
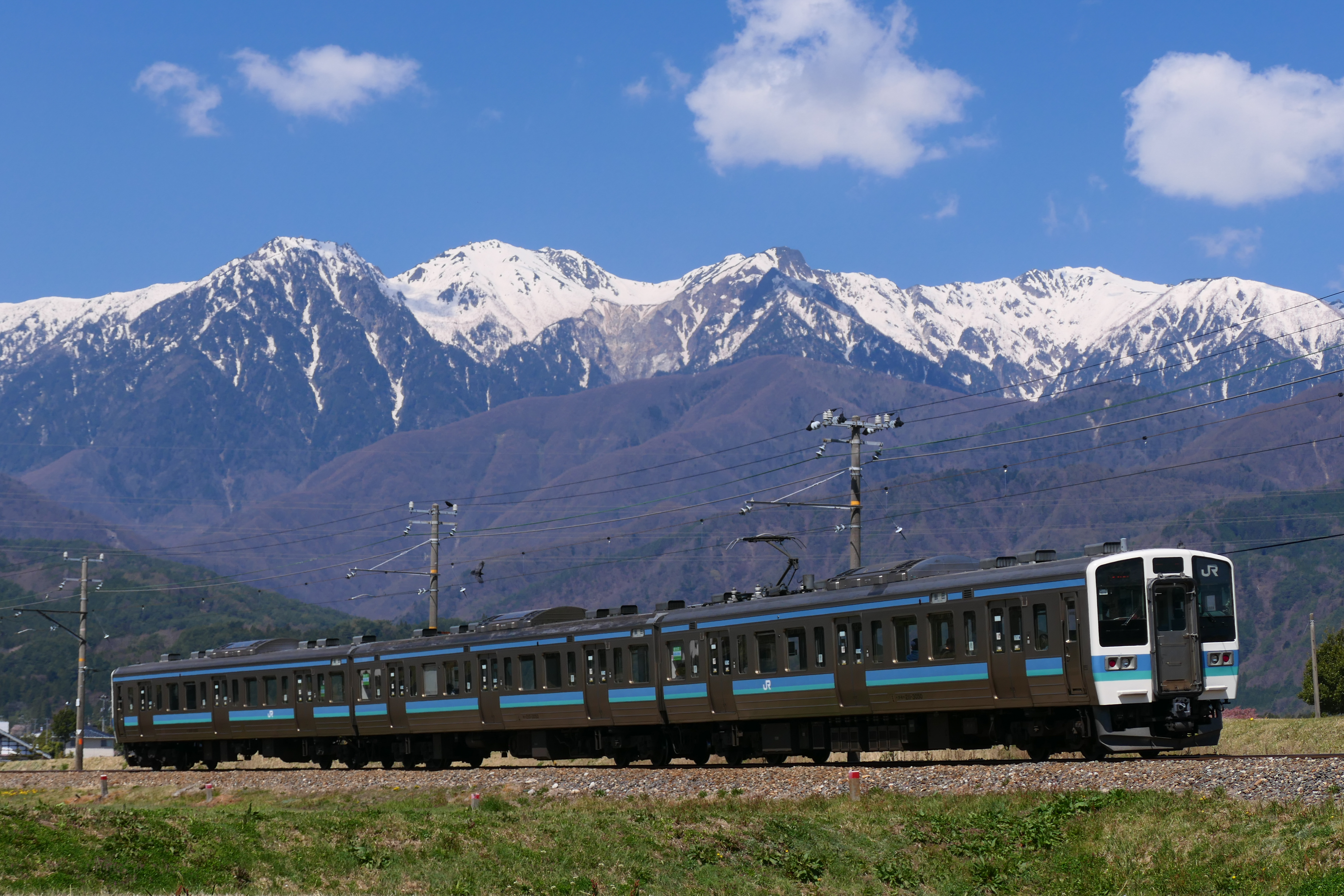
A Nagano-based JR East 211 series

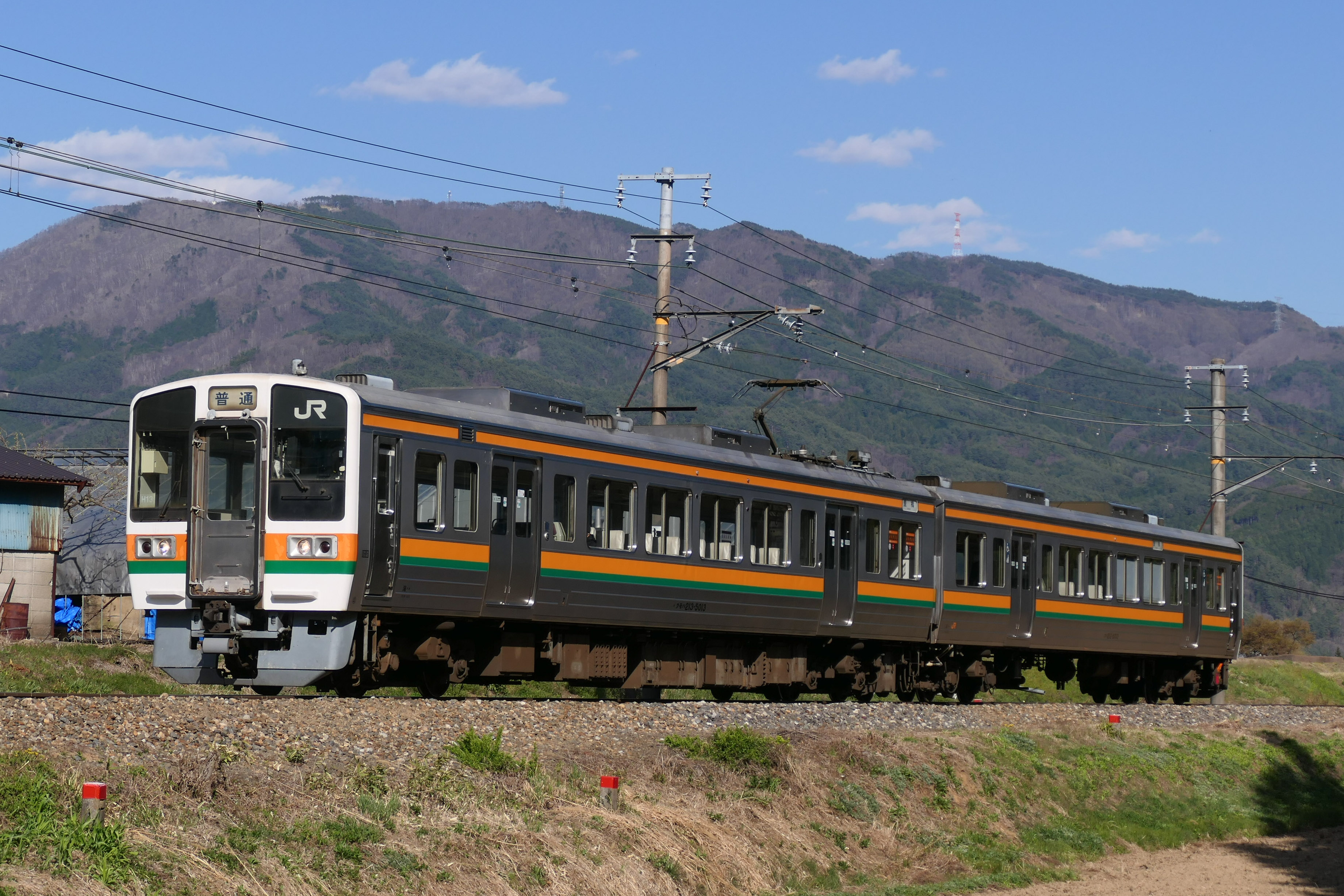
A JR Central 2-car 213-5000 series EMU, April 2021

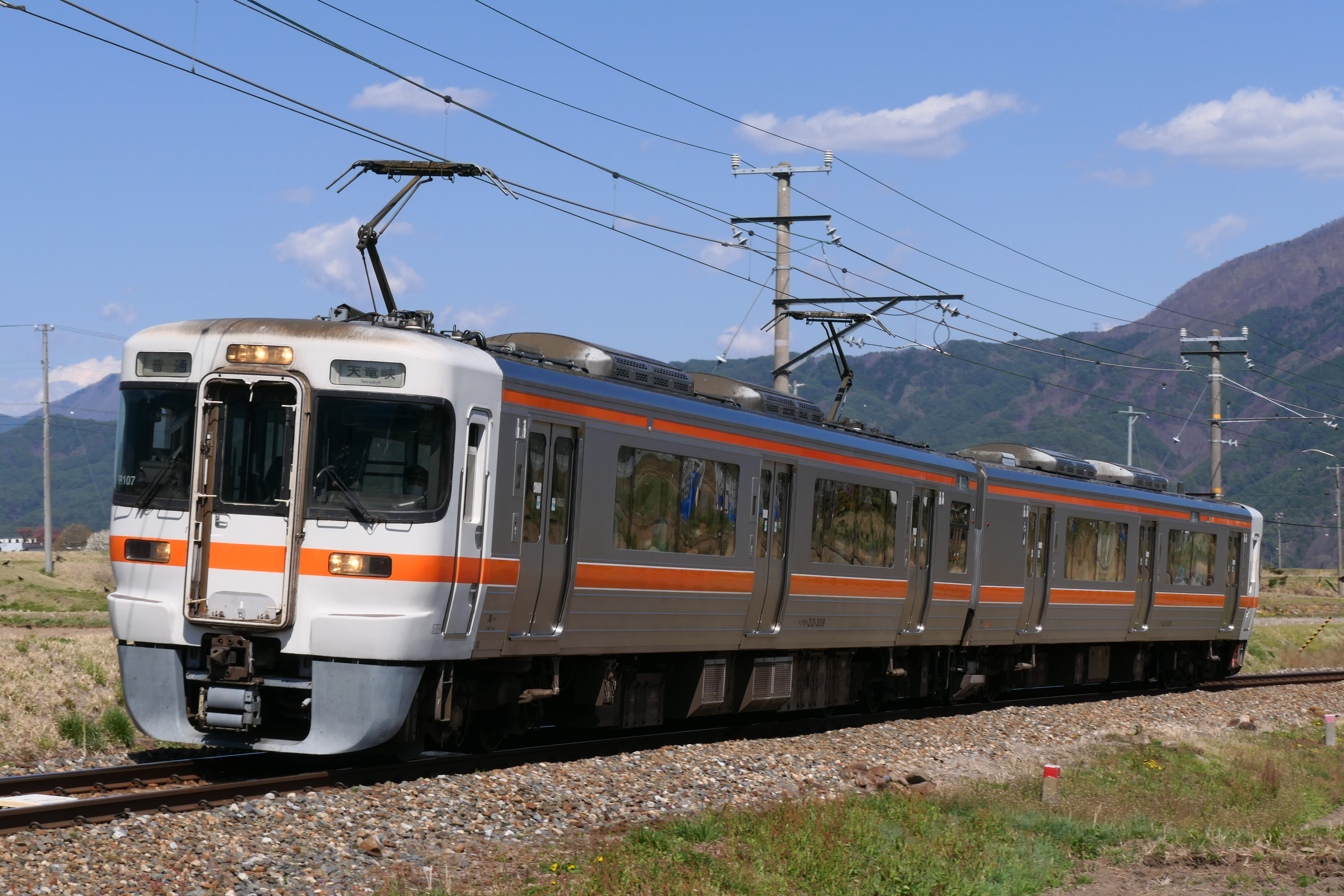
313-3000 series EMU, April 2021

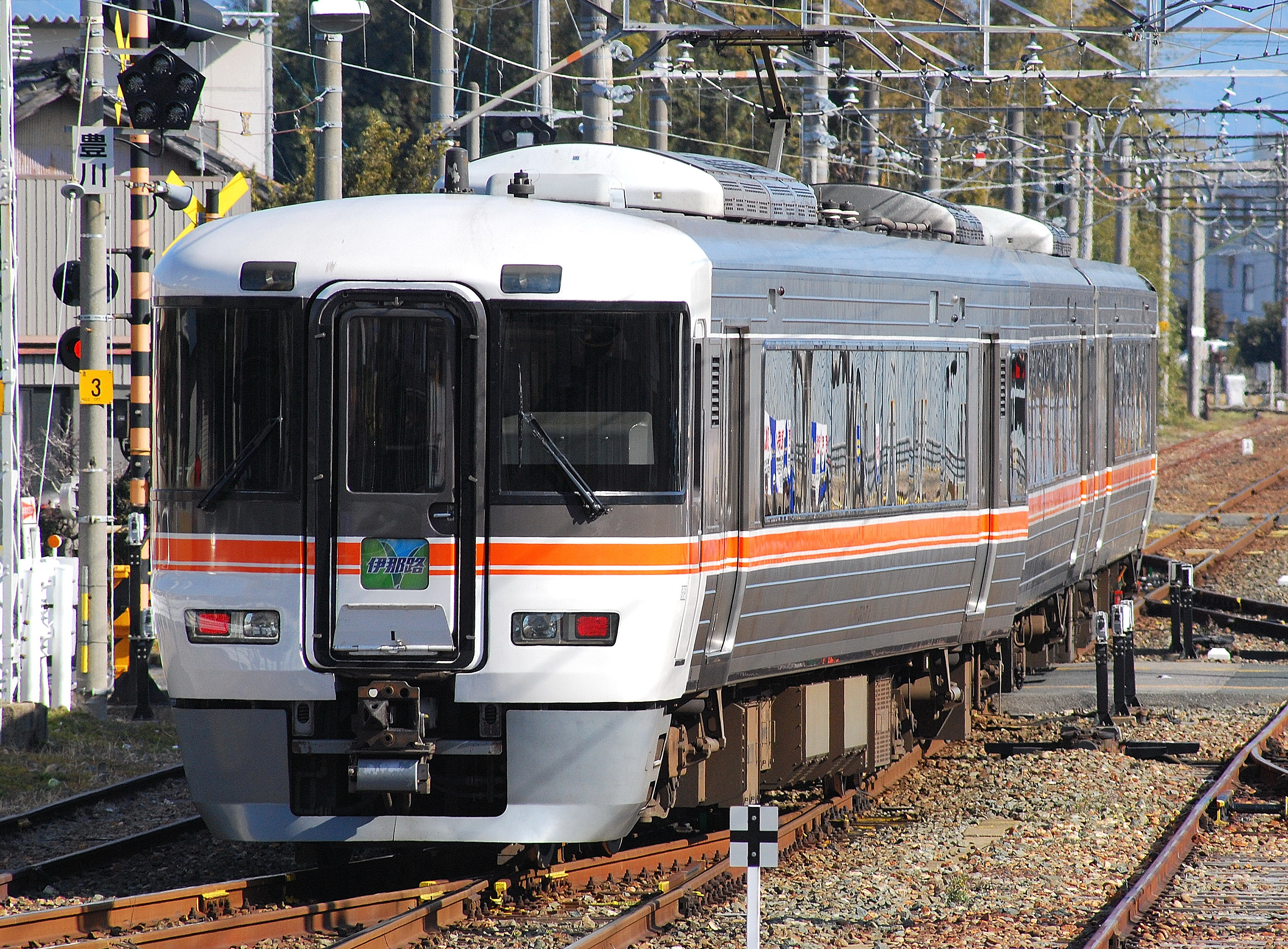
A JR Central 373 series EMU on an Inaji limited express, February 2012

=== Past rolling stock ===
- 115 series EMUs (until 14 March 2014, on JR East inter-running services)
- 119 series EMUs (1983 – 31 March 2012)
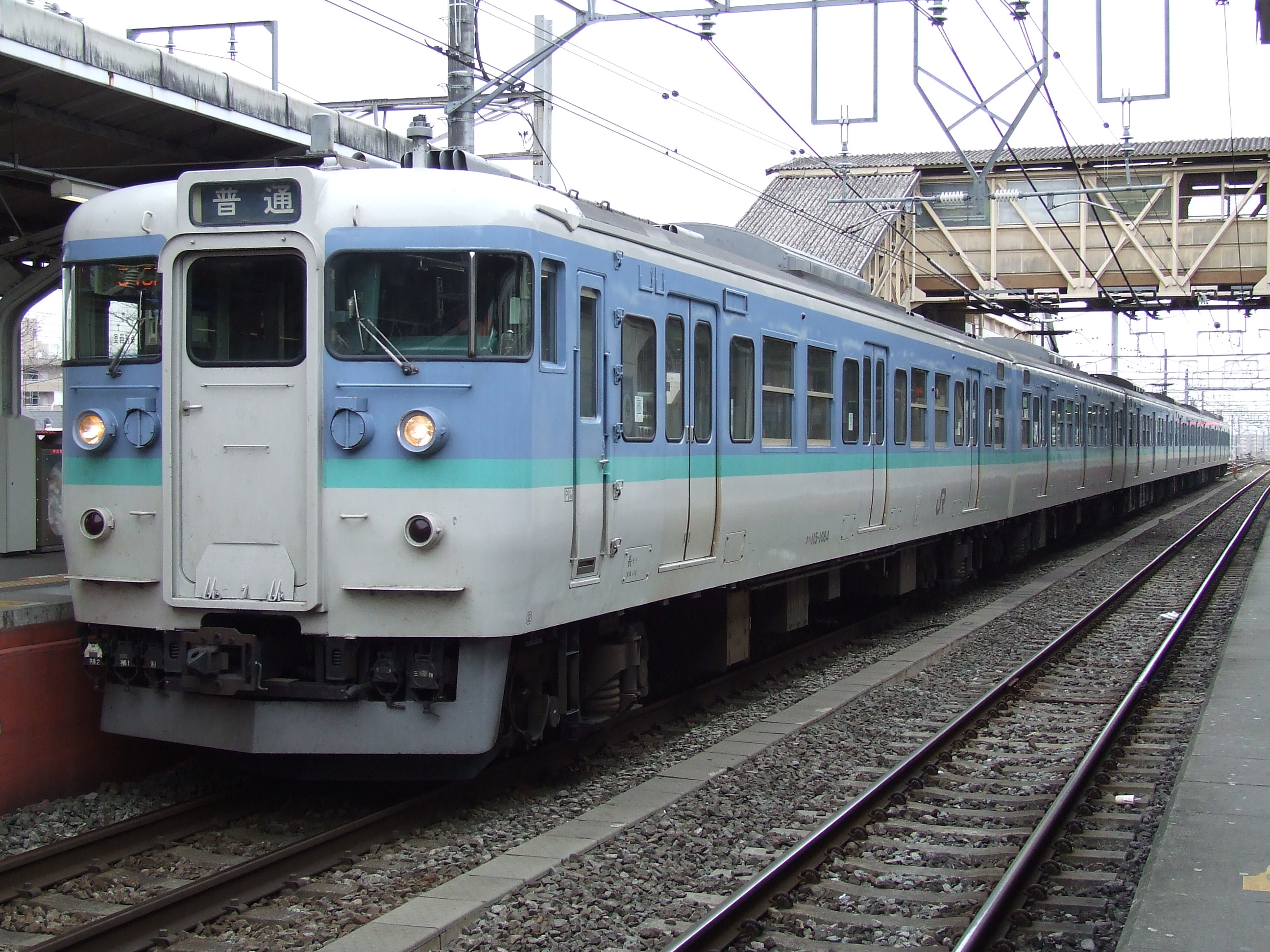
A Nagano-based JR East 115 series, March 2006

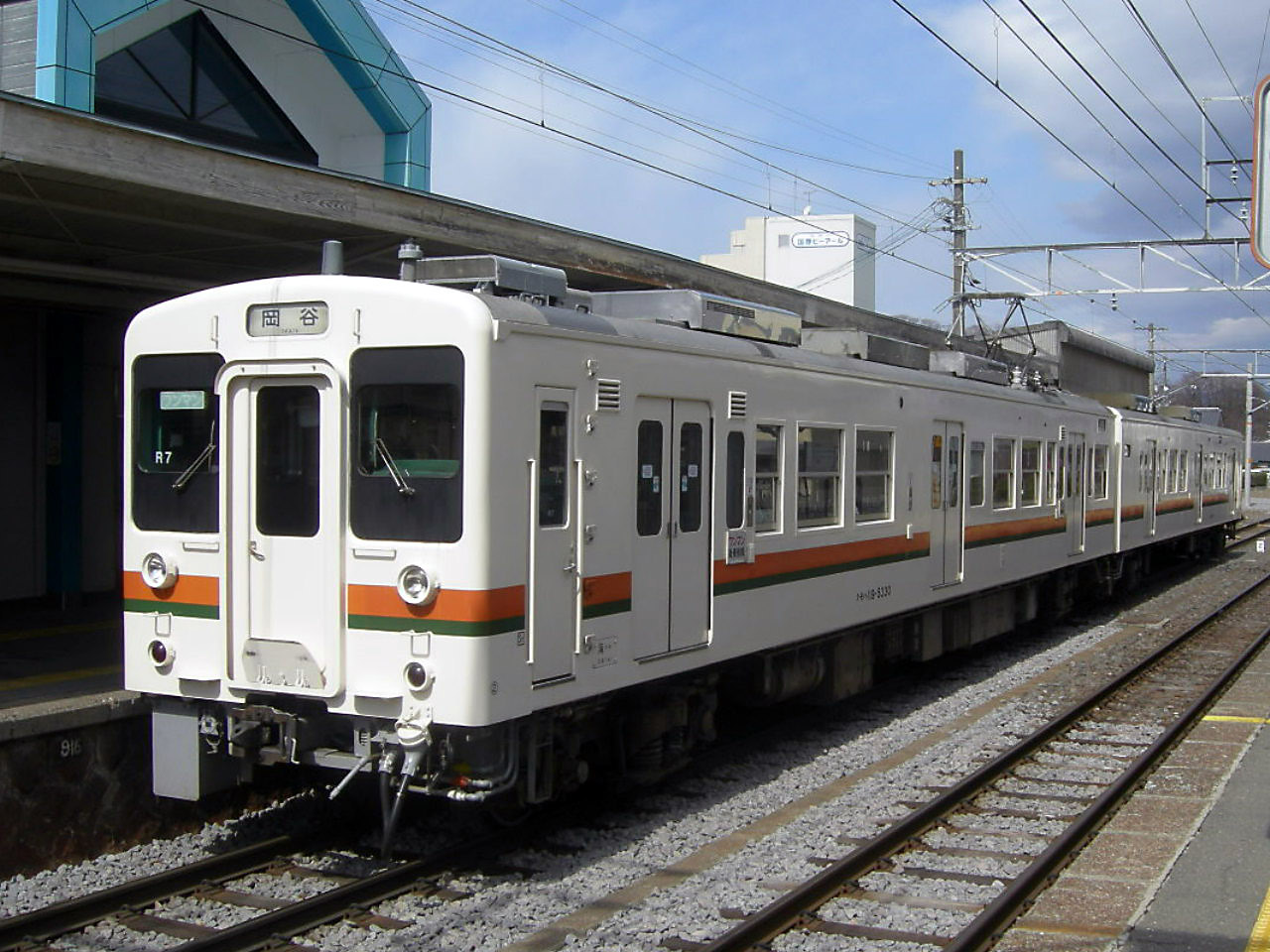
A JR Central 2-car 119 series EMU, March 2008

== History ==
The Toyokawa Railway opened the section from Toyohashi to Toyokawa in 1897, extending the line to Omi in 1900. At the northern end, the Ina Electric Railway opened the Tatsuno to Ina-Matsushima section (electrified at 1,200 V DC) in 1909, extending the line to Tenryukyo in sections between 1911 and 1927. The Horaitera Railway opened the Omi to Mikawa-Kawai section in 1923, and electrified it at 1,500 V DC in 1925 in conjunction with the electrification of the Toyohashi to Omi section the same year. The Toyohashi to Toyokawa section was double-tracked the following year. The Sanshin Railway opened the Tenryukyo to Kadoshima section as an electrified (1,500 V DC) line in 1932, the Mikawa-Kawai to Toei section (and all subsequent stages) as an electrified line in 1933, and connected the two sections (completing the line) in 1936. All four companies were nationalised in 1943.

In 1955, the overhead line voltage of the Tatsuno to Tenryukyo section was increased to 1,500 V DC.

CTC signalling was commissioned on the line between 1983 and 1984, and freight services ceased in 1996.

=== Former connecting lines ===
- Hon-Nagashino Station: A 23 km line to Mikawa-Taguchi, electrified at 1,500 V DC, opened between 1930 and 1932. Two 762mm gauge forest railways connected to this line: the Damine forest railway, which connected at the station of the same name, consisted of a 19 km 'main line' (including a tunnel) and a 7 km branch, operated between 1932 and 1960; the Taguchi forest railway connected at the terminus station, consisted of a 10 km 'main line' and a 6 km branch, operated between 1934 and 1963. Both forest railways were notable for initially employing people and "large dogs" to haul the empty wagons upgrade, which then rolled downhill when loaded. The Mikawa-Taguchi line closed following flood damage in 1968.

=== Proposed connecting line ===
- Chubu-Tenryu Station: Construction started on a 35 km line to Tenryu-Futamata on the Hamanako Line in 1967. Proposed to involve 20 bridges and 14 tunnels, about 13 km of roadbed, and about 50% of the overall work had been completed when construction was abandoned in 1980.

== See also ==
- List of railway lines in Japan
