= 373 series =

Japanese train type

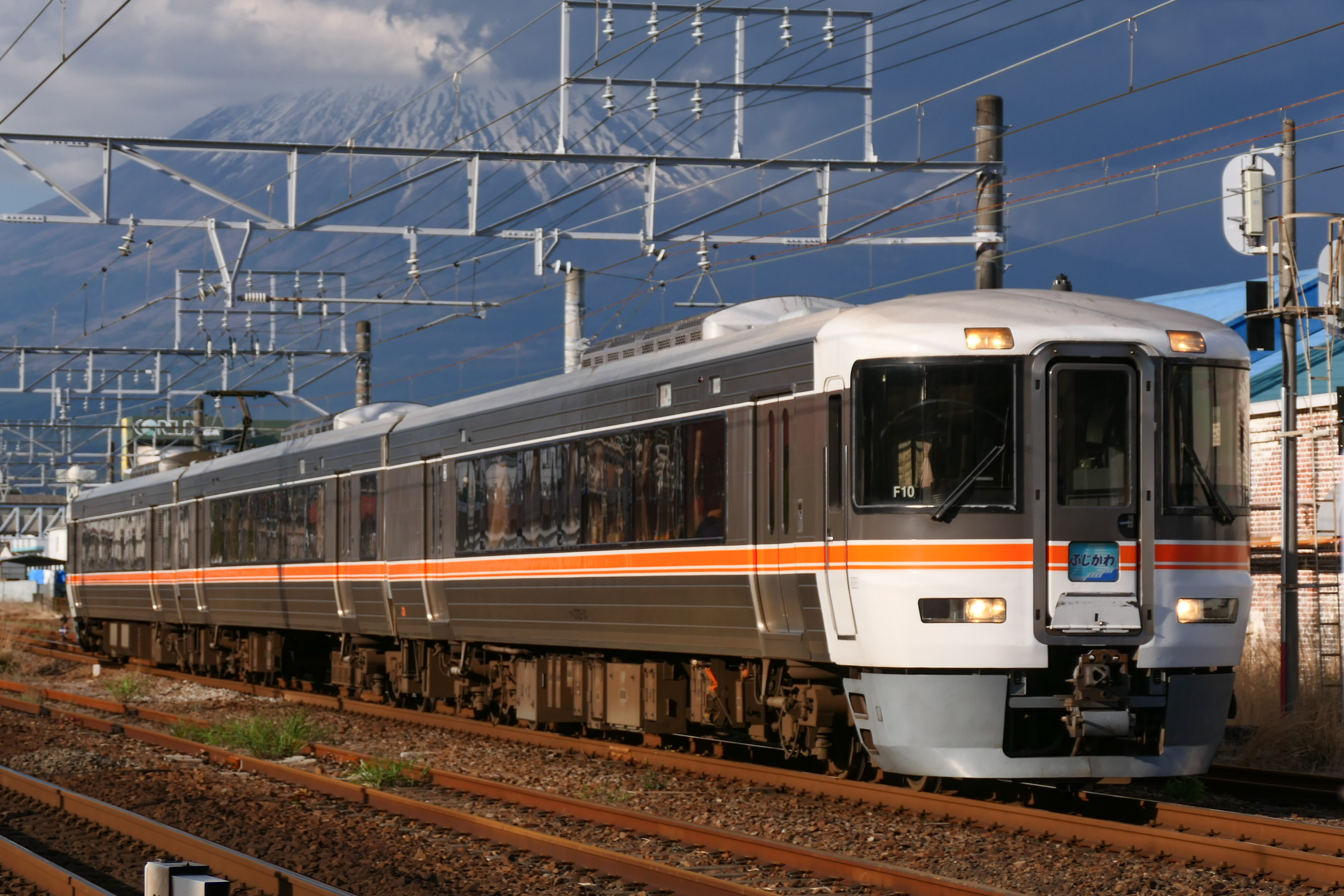
- 373 series on a Fujikawa service, April 2023
- In service: 1 October 1995 – present
- Manufacturers: Hitachi, Nippon Sharyo
- Replaced: 165 series
- Constructed: 1995–1996
- Number built: 42 vehicles (14 sets)
- Number in service: 42 vehicles (14 sets)
- Formation: 3 cars per trainset
- Fleet numbers: F1–F14
- Capacity: 180
- Operator: JR Central
- Depot: Shizuoka

Specifications
- Car body construction: Stainless steel
- Car length: 21,300 mm (69 ft 11 in)
- Width: 2,947 mm (9 ft 8.0 in)
- Height: 4,020 mm (13 ft 2 in)
- Doors: Sliding doors (2 pairs per side)
- Maximum speed: 120 km/h (75 mph)
- Traction system: GTO-VVVF (Toshiba)
- Electric system: 1,500 V DC overhead line
- Current collection: Pantograph
- Track gauge: 1,067 mm (3 ft 6 in)

The 373 series (373系) is an electric multiple unit (EMU) train type operated by Central Japan Railway Company (JR Central) on mid-distance limited express and Home Liner services in Japan since October 1995.

== Design ==
The trains were built jointly by Hitachi and Nippon Sharyo.

== Operations ==
As of 2011, 373 series sets are used on the following services.

- Limited Express Fujikawa (Shizuoka – Kōfu) (since 1 October 1995)
- Limited Express Inaji (Toyohashi – Iida) (since 16 March 1996)
- Home Liner Numazu
- Home Liner Hamamatsu
- Home Liner Shizuoka

373 series sets were formerly used on Wide View Tokai limited express services between Tokyo and Shizuoka from 16 March 1996 until 17 March 2007, and on Moonlight Nagara overnight rapid services between Tokyo and Ōgaki from 16 March 1996 until 14 March 2009.

== Formation ==
The 3-car sets, numbered F1 to F14, are formed as follows.

Car No.	1	2	3
Designation	Tc'	T	Mc
Numbering	KuHa 372	SaHa 373	KuMoHa 373
Capacity	52	68	60

The KuMoHa 373 car is fitted with one C-PS27G single-arm pantograph.

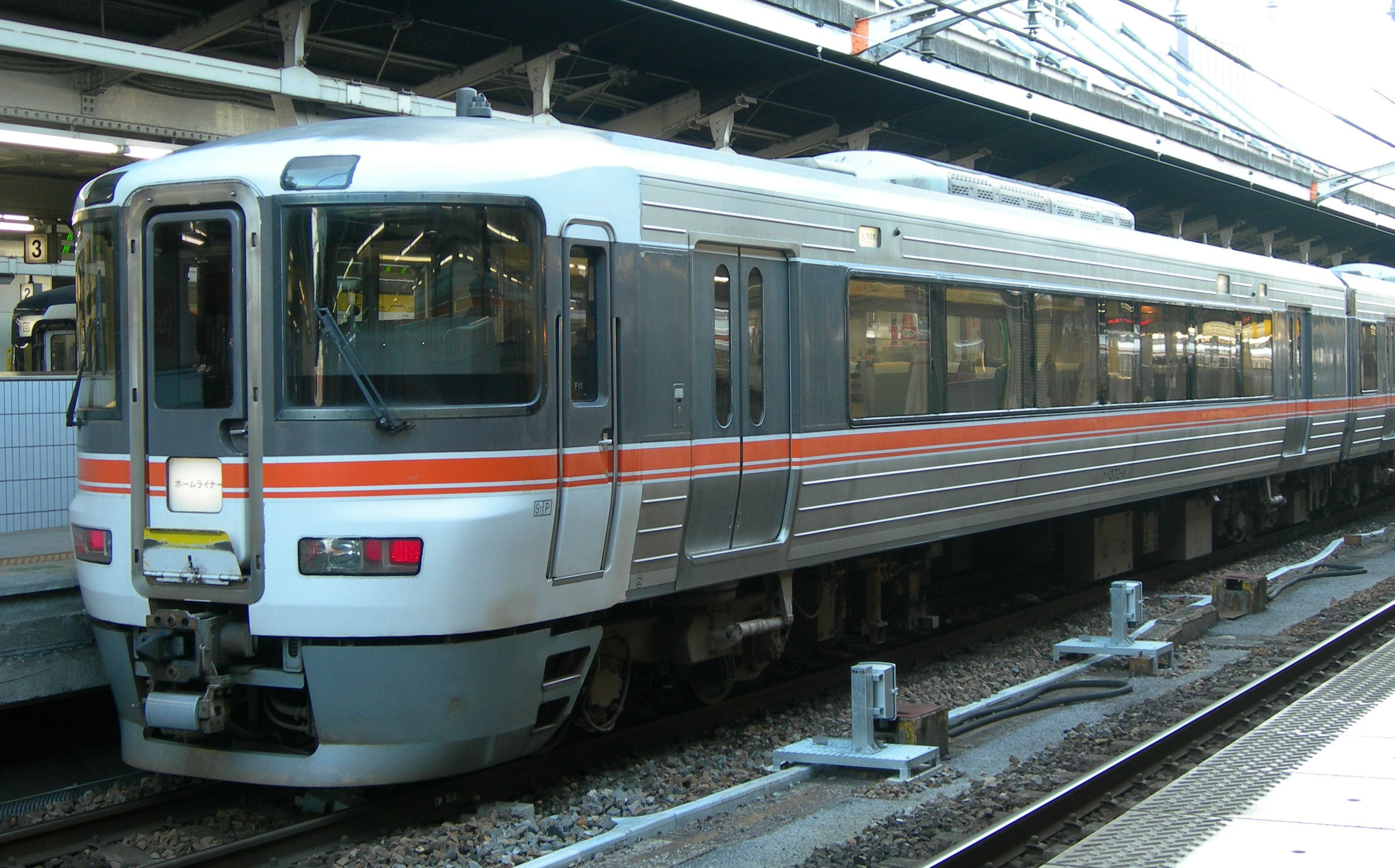
KuHa 372-11

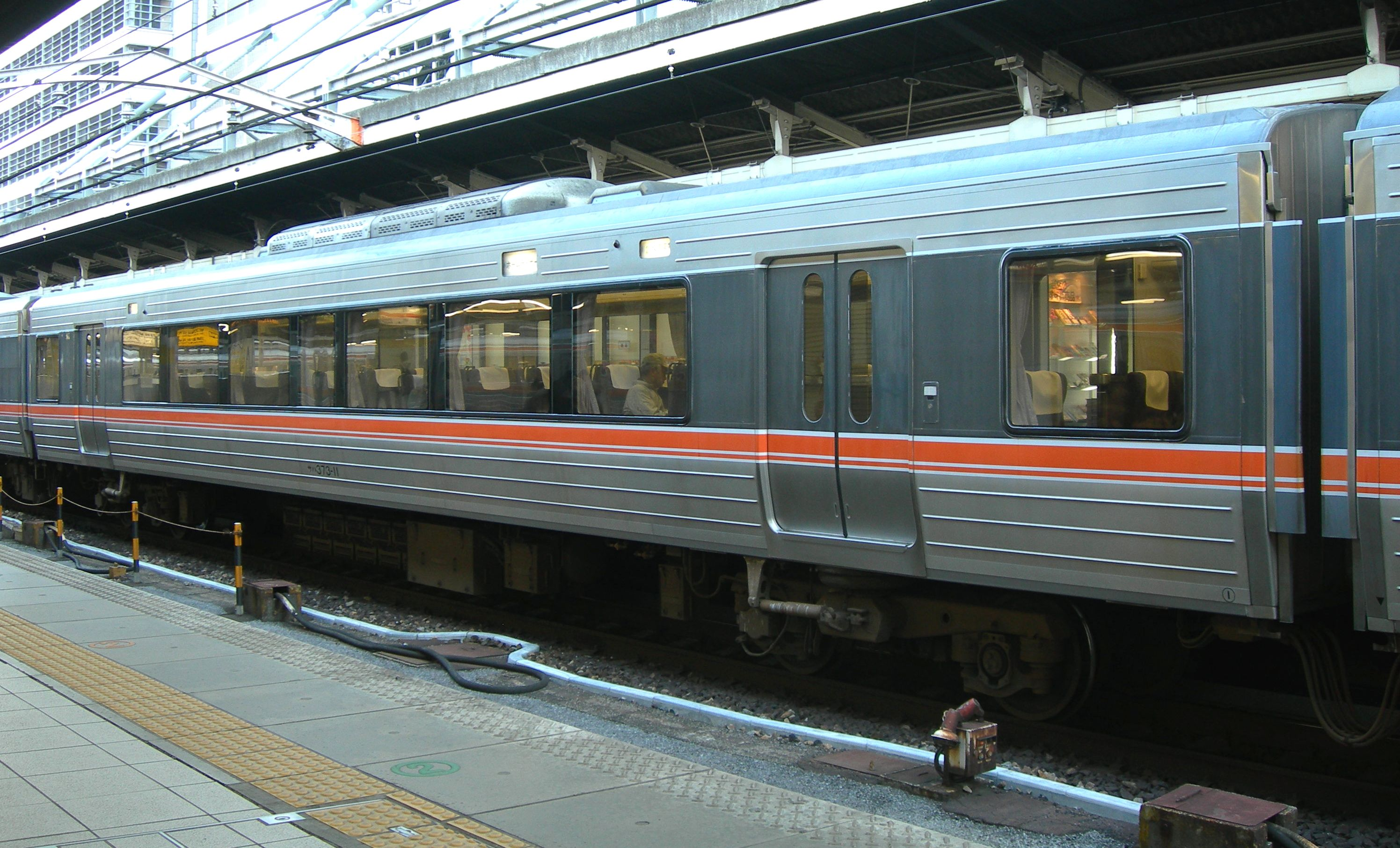
SaHa 373-11

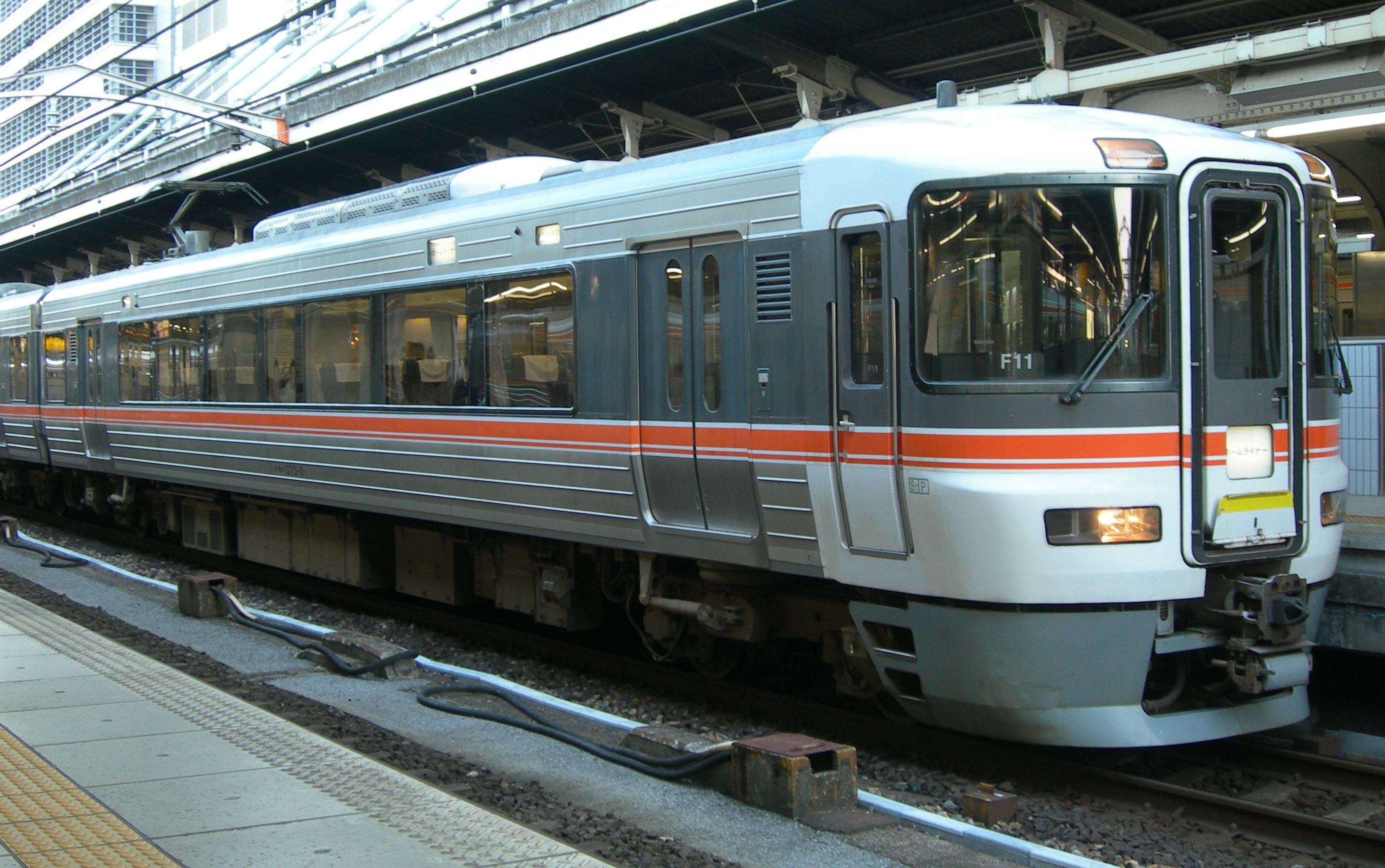
KuMoHa 373-11

== Interior ==
The 3-car sets are single class with rotating/reclining 2+2 seating arranged with a seat pitch of 970 millimetres (38 in). The KuMoHa 373 and SaHa 373 cars have fixed 4-seat "semi-compartment" bays at the ends of the cars with large tables.

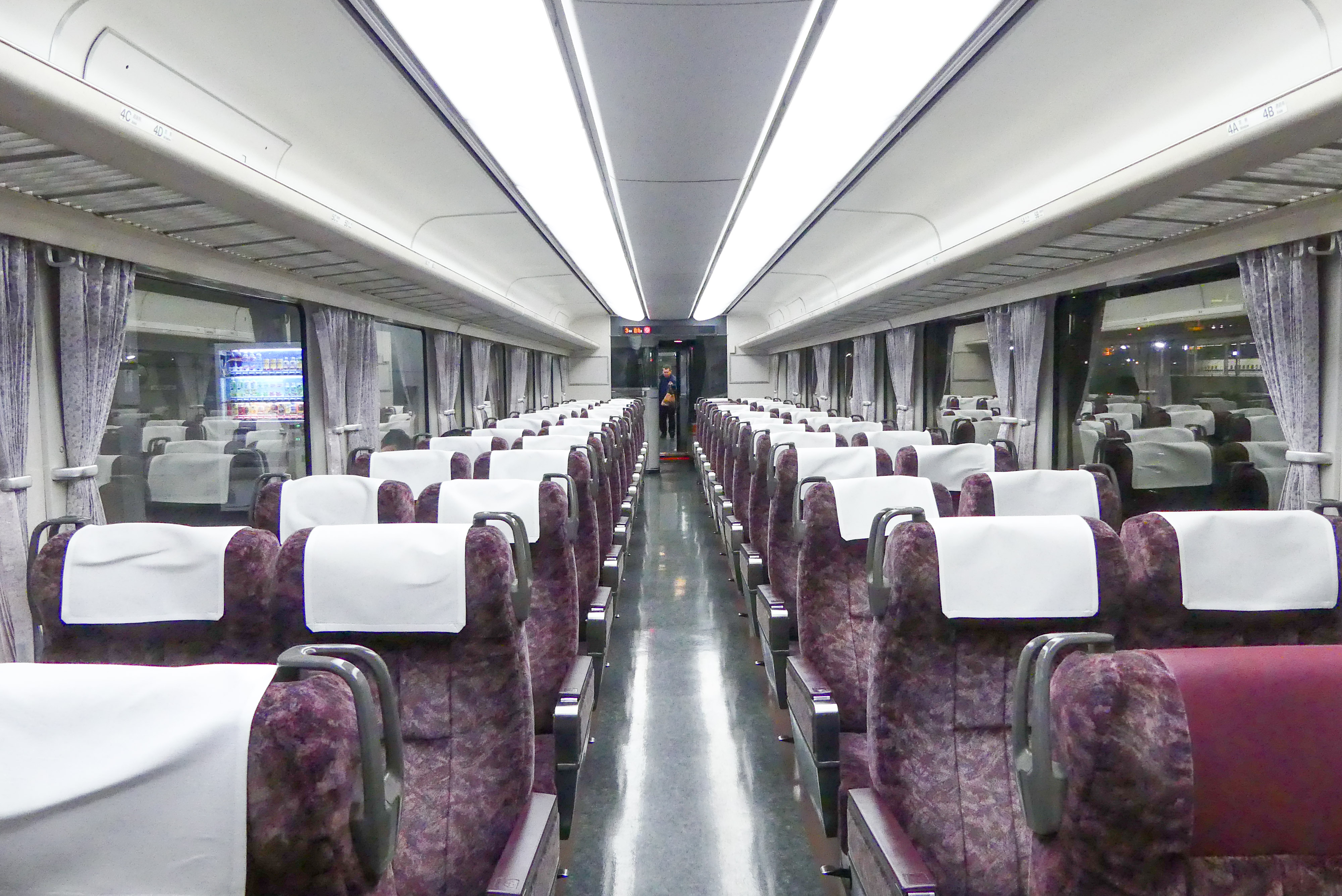
Interior view

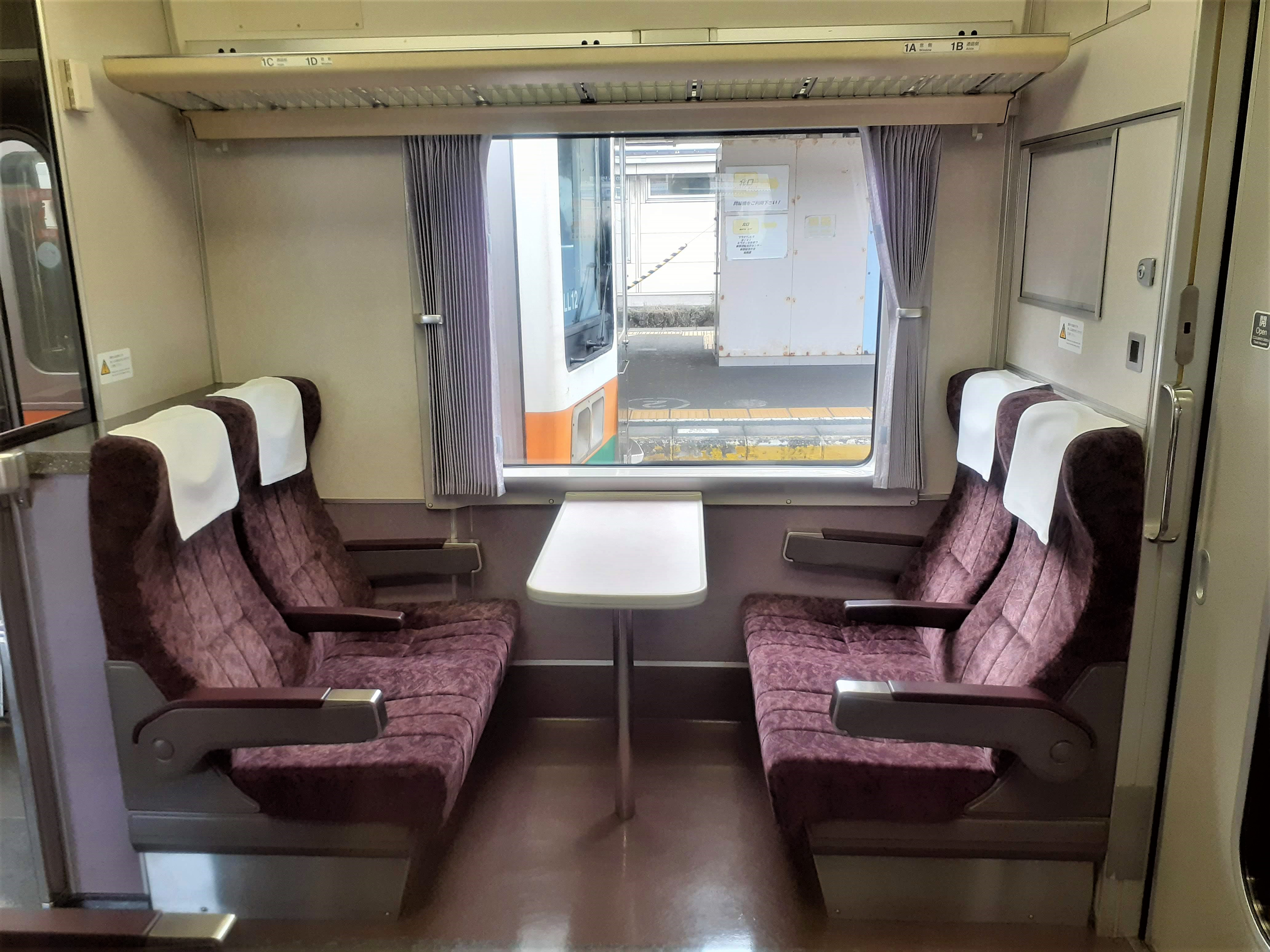
Semi-compartment seating bay

== History ==
The first sets were delivered from Nippon Sharyo in August 1995, entering revenue service from 1 October 1995 on Wide View Fujikawa services.

From 18 March 2007, all cars were made no-smoking.
