= Chūbu-Tenryū Station =

Railway station in Hamamatsu, Japan

Chūbu-Tenryū Station 中部天竜駅
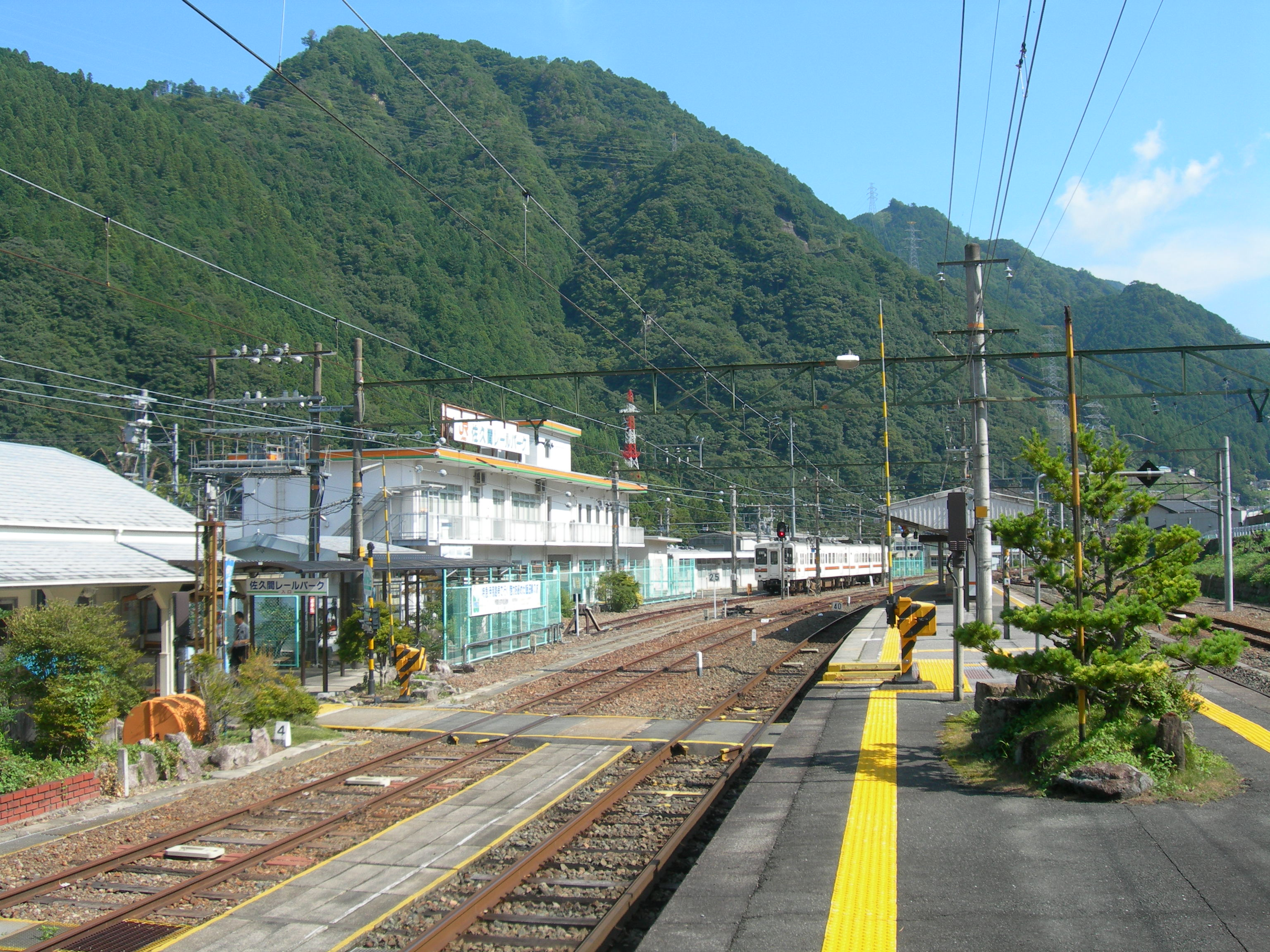
- Chūbu-Tenryū Station looking toward Sakuma Rail Park, August 2008

General information
- Location: Sakuma-cho Hamba 15, Tenryū-ku, Hamamatsu-shi, Shizuoka-ken; Japan
- Coordinates: 35.085000°N 137.802564°E
- Operator: JR Central
- Line: Iida Line
- Distance: 62.4 km from Toyohashi
- Platforms: 1 island platform

Other information
- Status: Staffed

History
- Opened: November 11, 1934
- Former names: Sakuma; Nakappe-Tenryū (until 1943)

Passengers
- FY2017: 130 (daily)
Location
- Location within Shizuoka Prefecture Location within Japan

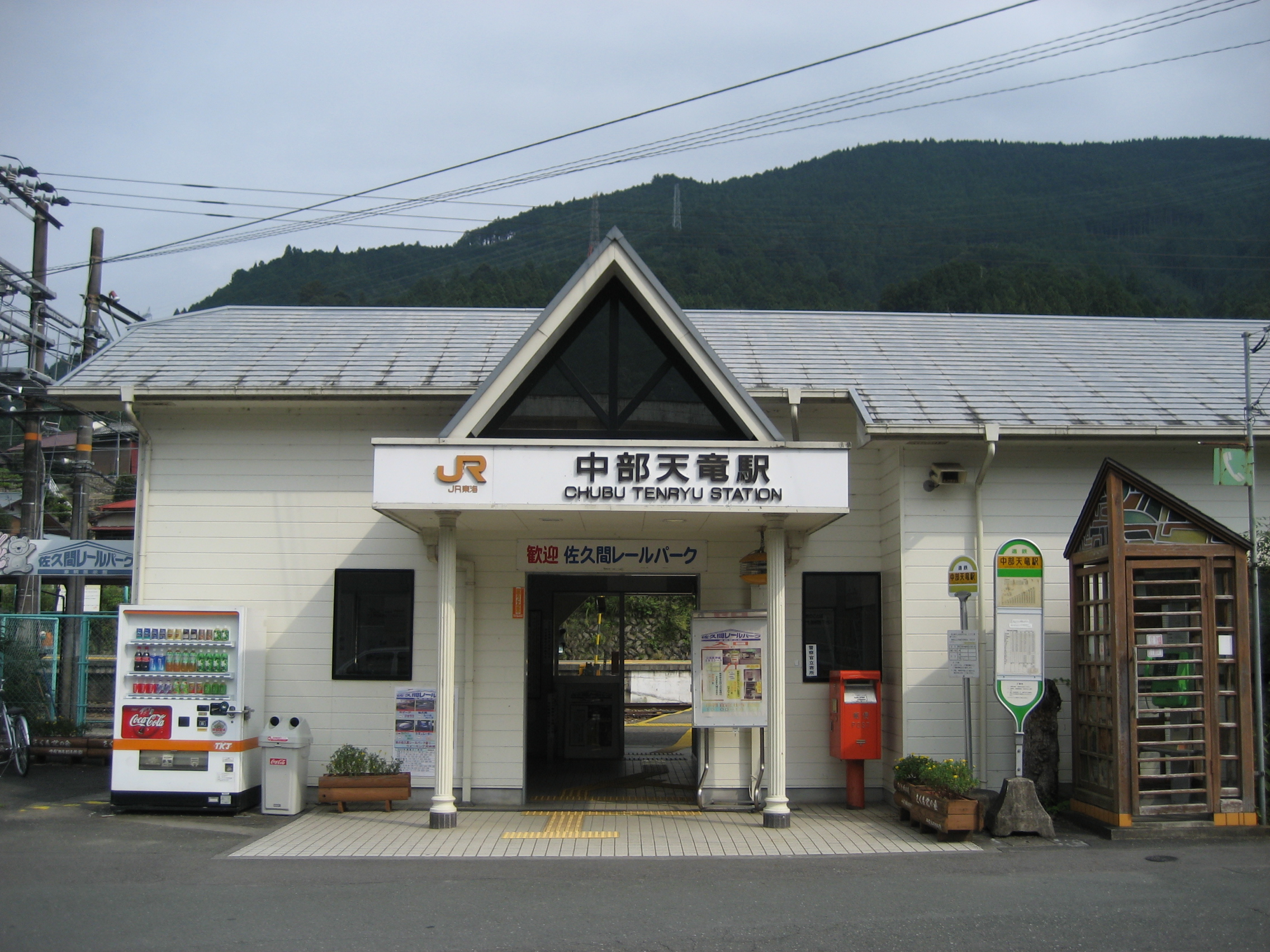
Chūbu-Tenryū Station in 2007

Chūbu-Tenryū Station (中部天竜駅, Chūbu-Tenryū-eki) is a railway station on the Iida Line in Tenryū-ku, Hamamatsu, Shizuoka Prefecture, Japan, operated by Central Japan Railway Company (JR Central).

== Lines ==
Chūbu-Tenryū Station is served by the Iida Line and is 62.4 kilometers from the starting point of the line at Toyohashi Station.

== Station layout ==
The station has one ground-level island platform connected to the station building by a level crossing. The station is attended.

=== Platforms ===
1	■ Iida Line	For Iida
2	■ Iida Line	For Toyohashi

== Adjacent stations ==
«	Service	»
Iida Line
Yuya-Onsen	Limited Express "Inaji" (特急「伊那路」)	Misakubo
Shimokawai	Local (普通)	Sakuma

== History ==
Chūbu-Tenryū Station was opened on November 11, 1934. The initial plans called for the station to eventually be joined by a spur line to Tenryū-Futamata Station on the Tenryū Hamanako Line. On August 1, 1943, the Sanshin Railway was nationalized along with several other local lines to form the Iida line. All freight services were discontinued in 1982 Along with its division and privatization of JNR on April 1, 1987, the station came under the control and operation of the Central Japan Railway Company (JR Central). The station was originally named Sakuma Station (the name presently used by the next station), was renamed in 1935 to Nakappe-Tenryū Station, and again at the time of nationalization to Chūbu-Tenryū Station (only due to a change in pronunciation of the kanji name).

The station was formerly home to the Sakuma Rail Park, a museum with exhibits on the Japanese railway system in general, and the Iida line in particular, including numerous examples of locomotives and rolling stock. The rail park closed in November 2010.

== Passenger statistics ==
In fiscal 2016, the station was used by an average of 130 passengers daily (boarding passengers only).

== Surrounding area ==
- Sakuma Dam
- Tenryū River

== See also ==
- List of railway stations in Japan
