= Ōzore Station =

Railway station in Hamamatsu, Japan

Ōzore Station 大嵐駅
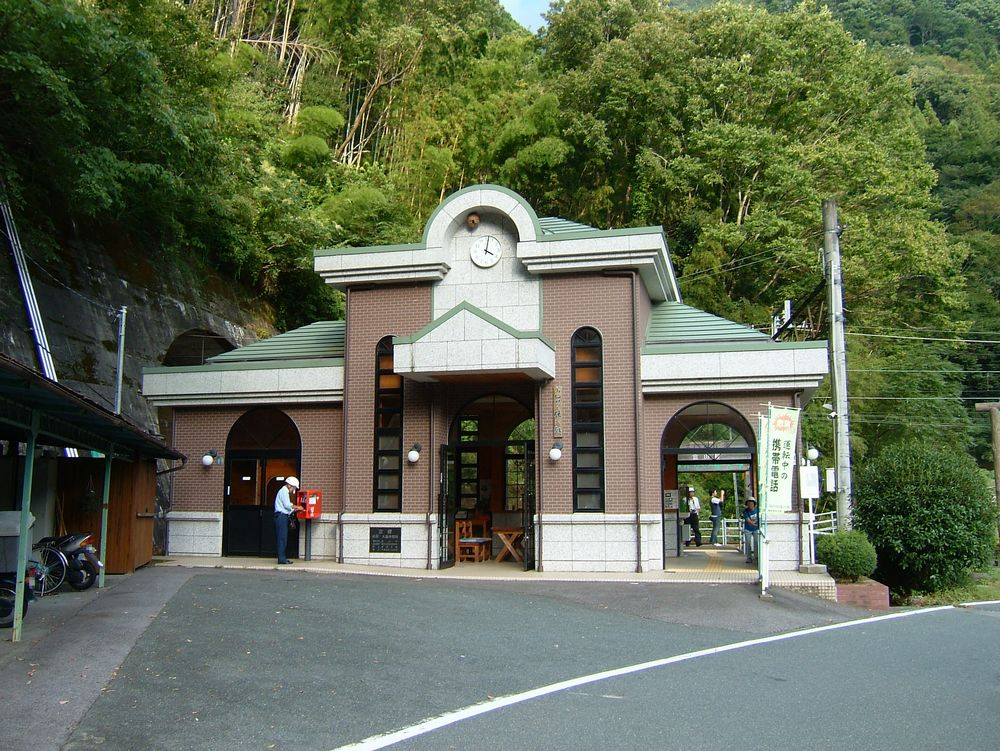
- Ōzore Station in September 2006

General information
- Location: Misakubo-cho Okuryoke 188, Tenryū-ku, Hamamatsu-shi, Shizuoka-ken; Japan
- Coordinates: 35.191078°N 137.818589°E
- Operator: JR Central
- Line: Iida Line
- Distance: 80.8 km from Toyohashi
- Platforms: 1 island platform

Other information
- Status: Unstaffed

History
- Opened: December 29, 1936

Passengers
- FY2017: 20 (daily)
Location
- Location within Shizuoka Prefecture Location within Japan

Ōzore Station (大嵐駅, Ōzore-eki) is a railway station on the Iida Line in Tenryū-ku, Hamamatsu, Shizuoka Prefecture, Japan, operated by Central Japan Railway Company (JR Central). The name of the station literally translates as “raging storm”, and while there are various theories, no one is entirely sure why this name was chosen. The station is located in Misakubo town, on the border with Nagano, but as that town is 96% forests, there is little nearby.

== Lines ==
Ōzore Station is served by the Iida Line and is 80.8 kilometers from the starting point of the line at Toyohashi Station.

== Station layout ==
Ōzore Station has one ground level island platform connected to a small brick station building modeled after Tokyo Station by a level crossing. The station is not attended.

=== Platforms ===
1	■ Iida Line	For Hamamatsu, Shizuoka, Mishima
2	■ Iida Line	For Toyohashi, Nagoya, Ogaki, Maibara

== Adjacent stations ==
«	Service	»
Iida Line
Limited Express "Inaji" (特急「伊那路」): Does not stop at this station
Misakubo	Local (普通)	Kowada

== Station history ==
Ōzore Station was established on December 29, 1936 as a station on the now-defunct Sanshin Railway. At the time, it was the main station for the residents of former Tomiyama village.

On August 1, 1943, the Sanshin Railway was nationalized along with several other local lines to form the Iida line. The tracks servicing the station originally followed the road next to it, but when the Sakuma Dam was completed in 1957 a section of these tracks were submerged. The remains of the old tracks can be seen to the right of the station parking lot.

All freight services were discontinued in December 1971 and the station has been unstaffed since February 1984. Along with the division and privatization of JNR on April 1, 1987, the station came under the control and operation of the Central Japan Railway Company. A new station building was completed on August 20, 1997. It was rebuilt to celebrate the sixtieth anniversary of the opening of the Iida line, and designed to resemble the Tokyo Station building.

== Passenger statistics ==
In fiscal 2016, the station was used by an average of 20 passengers daily (boarding passengers only).

== Surrounding area ==
The station is located at the exit of the Ohara Tunnel (5,063 meters), and the switch point for the station is located within the tunnel.

== See also ==
- List of railway stations in Japan
