= Sakuma Station =

Railway station in Hamamatsu, Japan

Sakuma Station 佐久間駅
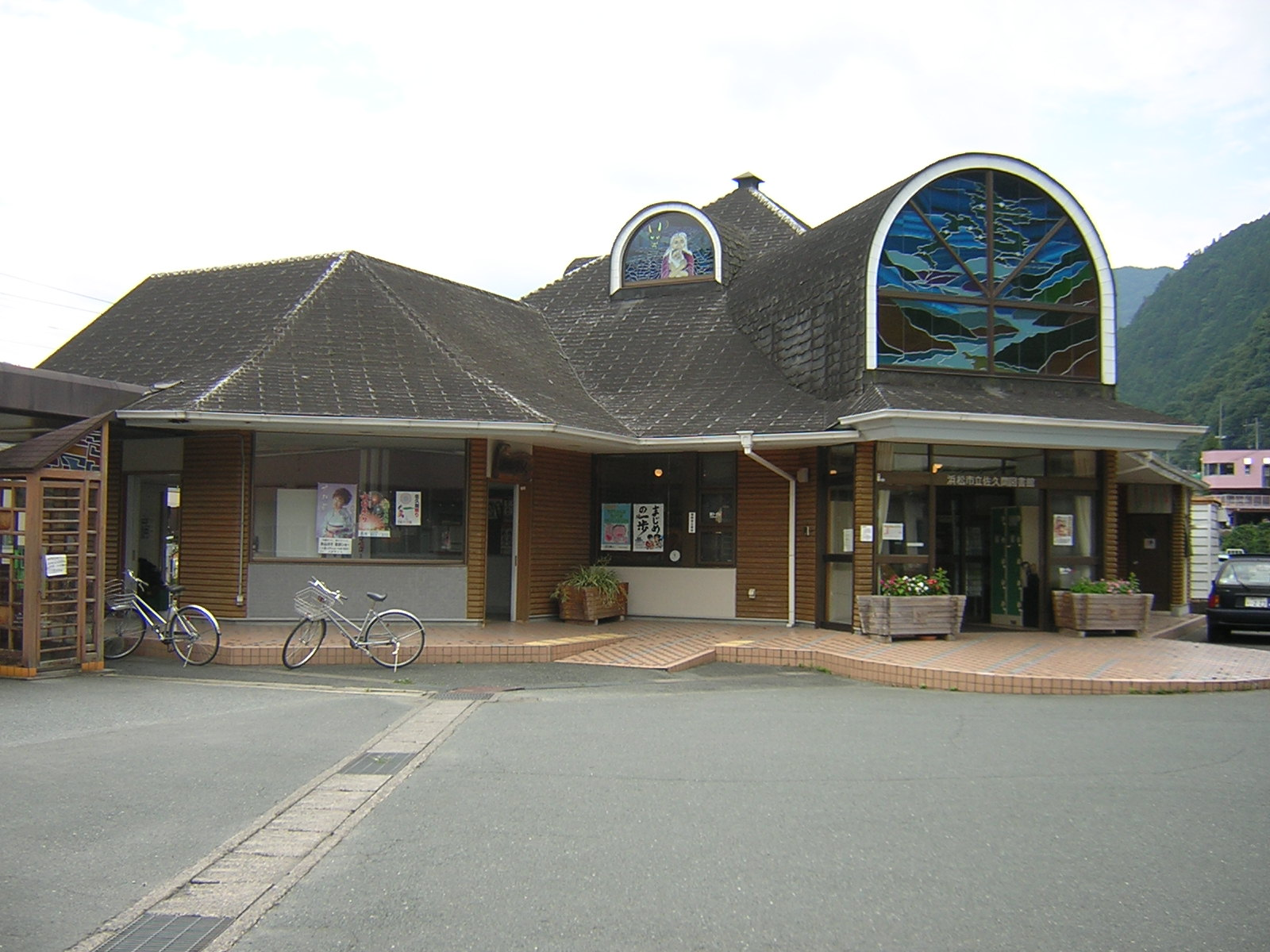
- Sakuma Station in September 2006

General information
- Location: Sakuma-cho, Sakuma 2434, Tenryū-ku, Hamamatsu-shi, Shizuoka; Japan
- Coordinates: 35.092127°N 137.810158°E
- Operator: JR Central
- Line: Iida Line
- Distance: 63.5 km from Toyohashi
- Platforms: 1 side platform

Other information
- Status: Unstaffed

History
- Opened: December 30, 1936
- Former names: Sakuma-Misakuboguchi (until 1938)

Passengers
- FY2017: 11 (daily)
Location
- Location within Shizuoka Prefecture Location within Japan

Sakuma Station (佐久間駅, Sakuma-eki) is a railway station on the Iida Line in Tenryū-ku, Hamamatsu, Shizuoka Prefecture, Japan, operated by Central Japan Railway Company (JR Central).

== Lines ==
Sakuma Station is served by the Iida Line and is 63.5 kilometers from the starting point of the line at Toyohashi Station.

== Station layout ==
The station has one ground-level side platform serving a single bi-directional track. The station building doubles as a branch of the Hamammatsu City Library, and passengers waiting for trains have access to the collection. The station formerly had an island platform, but was rebuilt in 2008.. The station is not attended.

== Station history ==
Sakuma station was established on November 10, 1936, as the "Sakuma-Masakuboguchi stop" (佐久間水窪口停留場) on the now-defunct Sanshin Railway. Its name was changed to the "Sakuma stop" in 1938, and it was upgraded to a full station on February 7, 1941. On August 1, 1943, the Sanshin Railway was nationalized along with several other local lines to form the Iida line.

The station was relocated slightly to the west in 1955 as a part of rerouting of the line to avoid the rising waters of the Sakuma Dam. All freight services were discontinued in December 1971 and the station was unstaffed from February 1984. Along with its division and privatization of JNR on April 1, 1987, the station came under the control and operation of the Central Japan Railway Company.

== Adjacent stations ==
«	Service	»
Iida Line
Limited Express "Inaji" (特急「伊那路」): Does not stop at this station
Chūbu-Tenryū	Local (普通)	Aizuki

== Passenger statistics ==
In fiscal 2016, the station was used by an average of 11 passengers daily (boarding passengers only).

== Surrounding area ==
- former Sakuma Town Hall

== See also ==
- List of railway stations in Japan
