= Iida Station =

Railway station in Iida, Nagano Prefecture, Japan

Iida Station 飯田駅
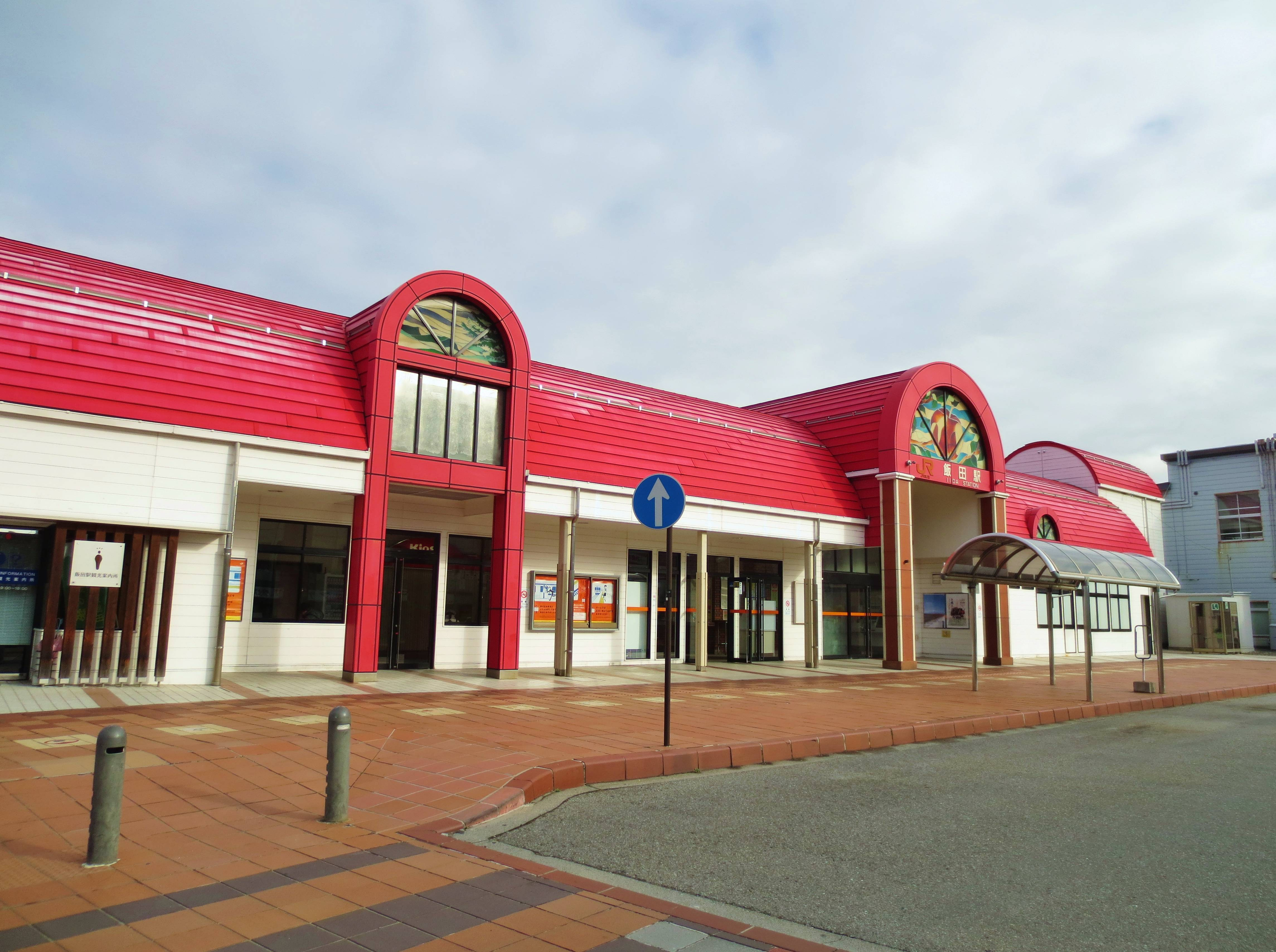
- Iida Station in March 2016

General information
- Location: 5356 Kamiiida, Iida-shi, Nagano-ken 395-0000; Japan
- Coordinates: 35°31′11″N 137°49′16″E
- Elevation: 512.0 meters
- Operator: JR Central
- Line: Iida Line
- Distance: 129.3 km from Toyohashi
- Platforms: 1 side + 1 island platform

Other information
- Status: Staffed (Midori no Madoguchi)

History
- Opened: 3 August 1923

Passengers
- FY2016: 959 (daily)
Location
- Location within Nagano Prefecture Location within Japan

Iida Station (飯田駅, Iida-eki) is a railway station on the Iida Line in the city of Iida, Nagano, Japan, operated by Central Japan Railway Company (JR Central). It is the main station of the city.

== Lines ==
Iida Station is served by the Iida Line and is 129.3 kilometers from the starting point of the line at Toyohashi Station.

== Station layout ==
The station consists of a one ground-level side platform and one ground-level island platform connected by a footbridge. The station has a Midori no Madoguchi staffed ticket office.

=== Platforms ===
1	■ Iida Line	for Tenryūkyō and Toyohashi for Tatsuno
2	■ Iida Line	for Tenryūkyō and Toyohashi for Tatsuno
3	■ Iida Line	for Tenryūkyō and Toyohashi for Tatsuno

== Adjacent stations ==
«	Service	»
Iida Line
Terminus	Rapid Misuzu	Motozenkōji
Tenryūkyō	Limited Express Inaji	Terminus
Kiriishi	Local	Sakuramachi

== History ==
Ina Electric Railway opened the station on 3 August 1923 when the railway was extended from Motozenkōji to Iida. The line was nationalized on 1 August 1943. With the privatization of Japanese National Railways (JNR) on 1 April 1987, the station came under the control of JR Central.

== Bus terminal ==
=== Highway Buses ===
- Chūō Kōsoku Bus; For Shinjuku Station
- Chūō Kōsoku Bus; For Tachikawa Station, Akishima Station, Minami-ōsawa Station
- Bay Bridge; For Yokohama Station
- Misuzu Highway Bus; For Komagane, Ina, Matsumoto, and Nagano Station
- Chuodo Kosoku Bus; For Nagoya Station
- Alpen Ina; For Momoyamadai Station, Shin-Ōsaka Station, and Umeda Station

== Passenger statistics ==
In fiscal 2016, the station was used by an average of 959 passengers daily (boarding passengers only).

== Surrounding area ==
- Iida Post Office
- Iida Hospital

== See also ==
- List of railway stations in Japan
