= Tenryū Koshibu Suikei Prefectural Natural Park =

Natural park of Nagano prefecture, Japan

- 天竜小渋水系県立自然公園
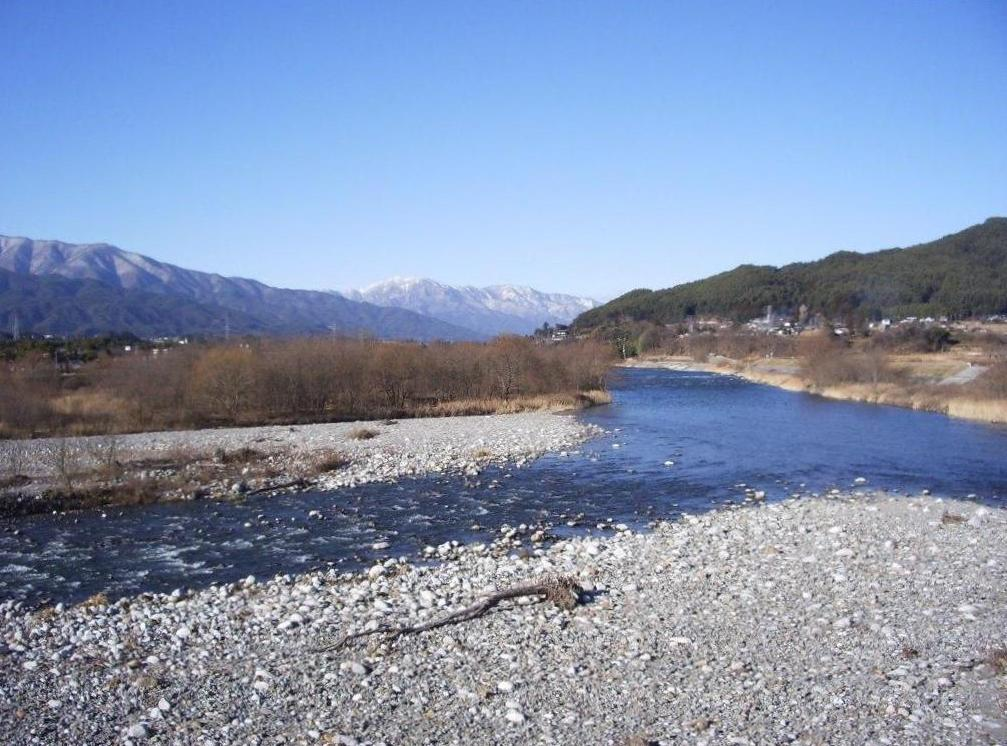
- Tenryū River
- Location: Nagano Prefecture, Japan
- Area: 25.61 km^{2} (9.89 sq mi)
- Established: 21 December 1970

Tenryū Koshibu Suikei Prefectural Natural Park (天竜小渋水系県立自然公園, Tenryū Koshibu Suikei kenritsu shizen kōen) is a Prefectural Natural Park in southern Nagano Prefecture, Japan. Established in 1970, the park's central feature is the Tenryū River. The park spans the borders of the municipalities of Iida, Matsukawa, Nakagawa, Ōshika, Takagi, Takamori, and Toyooka.

== See also ==
- National Parks of Japan
