= Hijiriyama Kōgen Prefectural Natural Park =

Natural park of Nagano prefecture, Japan

- 聖山高原県立自然公園
- IUCN category IV (habitat/species management area)
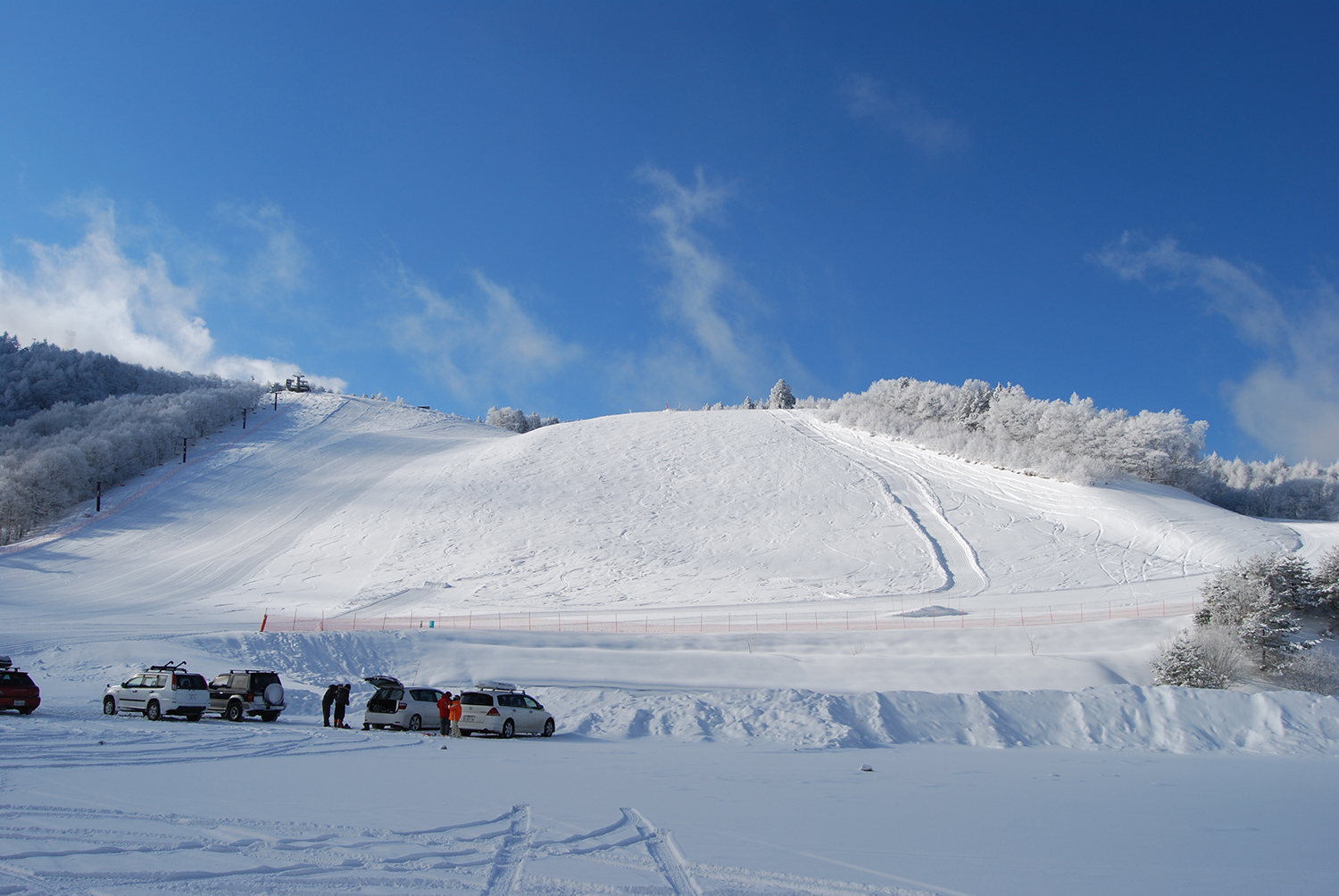
- Mount Hijiri

- Location within Nagano Prefecture Location within Japan
- Interactive map of Hijiriyama Kōgen Prefectural Natural Park
- Location: Nagano Prefecture, Japan
- Coordinates: 36°27′N 138°02′E
- Area: 21.50 km^{2} (8.30 sq mi)
- Established: 8 July 1965

Hijiriyama Kōgen Prefectural Natural Park (聖山高原県立自然公園, Hijiriyama Kōgen kenritsu shizen kōen) is a Prefectural Natural Park in central Nagano Prefecture, Japan. Established in 1965, the park's central feature is Mount Hijiri (聖山). Two separate areas of the park span the borders of the municipalities of Chikuhoku, Chikuma, Ikusaka, Nagano, and Omi.

== See also ==
- National Parks of Japan
