= Mibugawa Suikei Prefectural Natural Park =

National park in Japan

Coordinates: 35°48′51″N 138°04′45″E

- 三峰川水系県立自然公園
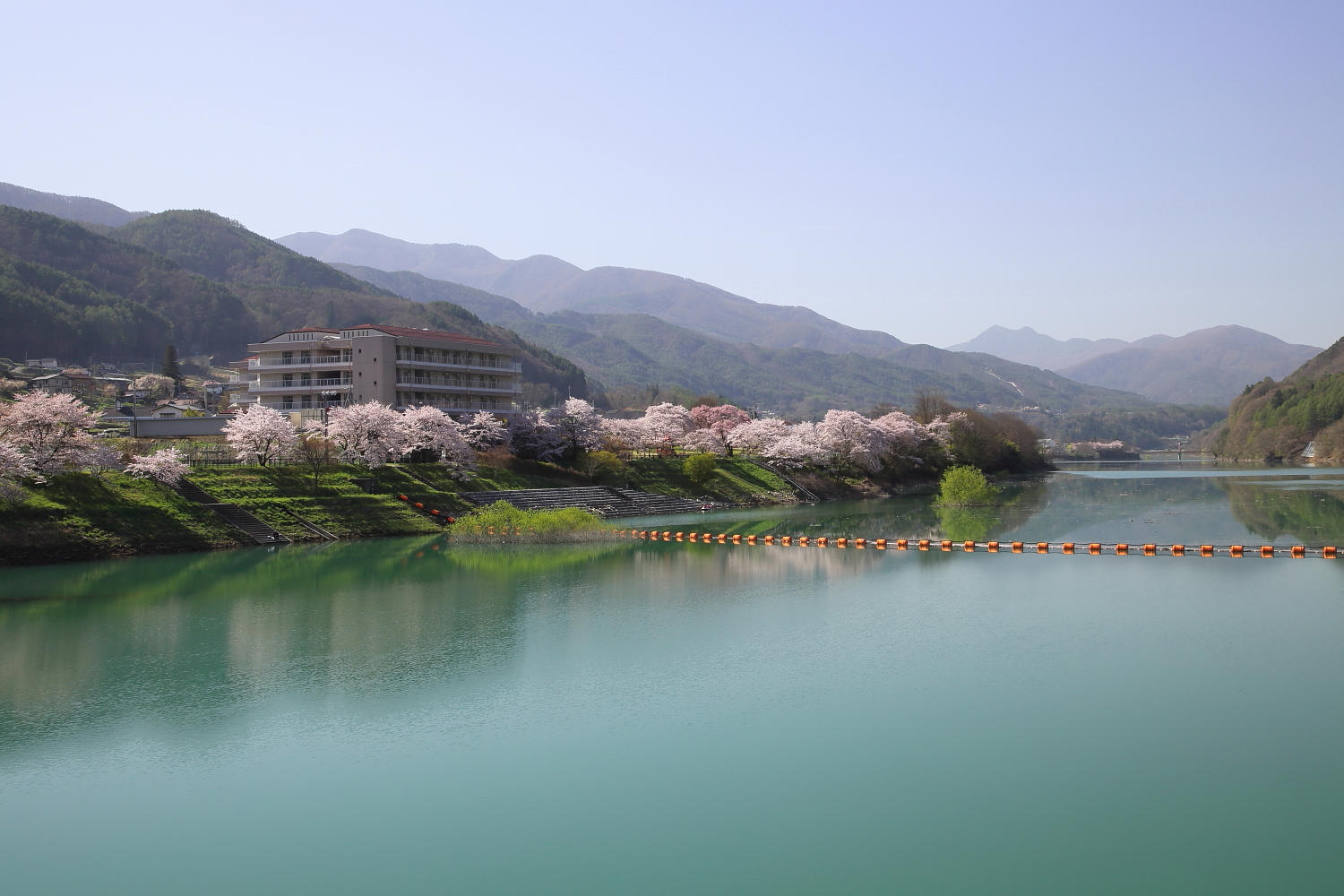
- Lake Miwa
- Location: Nagano Prefecture, Japan
- Area: 5.26 km^{2} (2.03 sq mi)
- Established: 1 May 1958

Mibugawa Suikei Prefectural Natural Park (三峰川水系県立自然公園, Mibugawa Suikei kenritsu shizen kōen) is a Prefectural Natural Park in south-central Nagano Prefecture, Japan. Established in 1958, the park's central feature is the Mibu River (三峰川). The park is wholly within the municipality of Ina.

== See also ==
- National Parks of Japan
