= Nagano Prefecture =

Prefecture in central Japan

Nagano Prefecture 長野県
- Prefecture

Japanese transcription(s)
  - Japanese: 長野県
  - Rōmaji: Nagano-ken
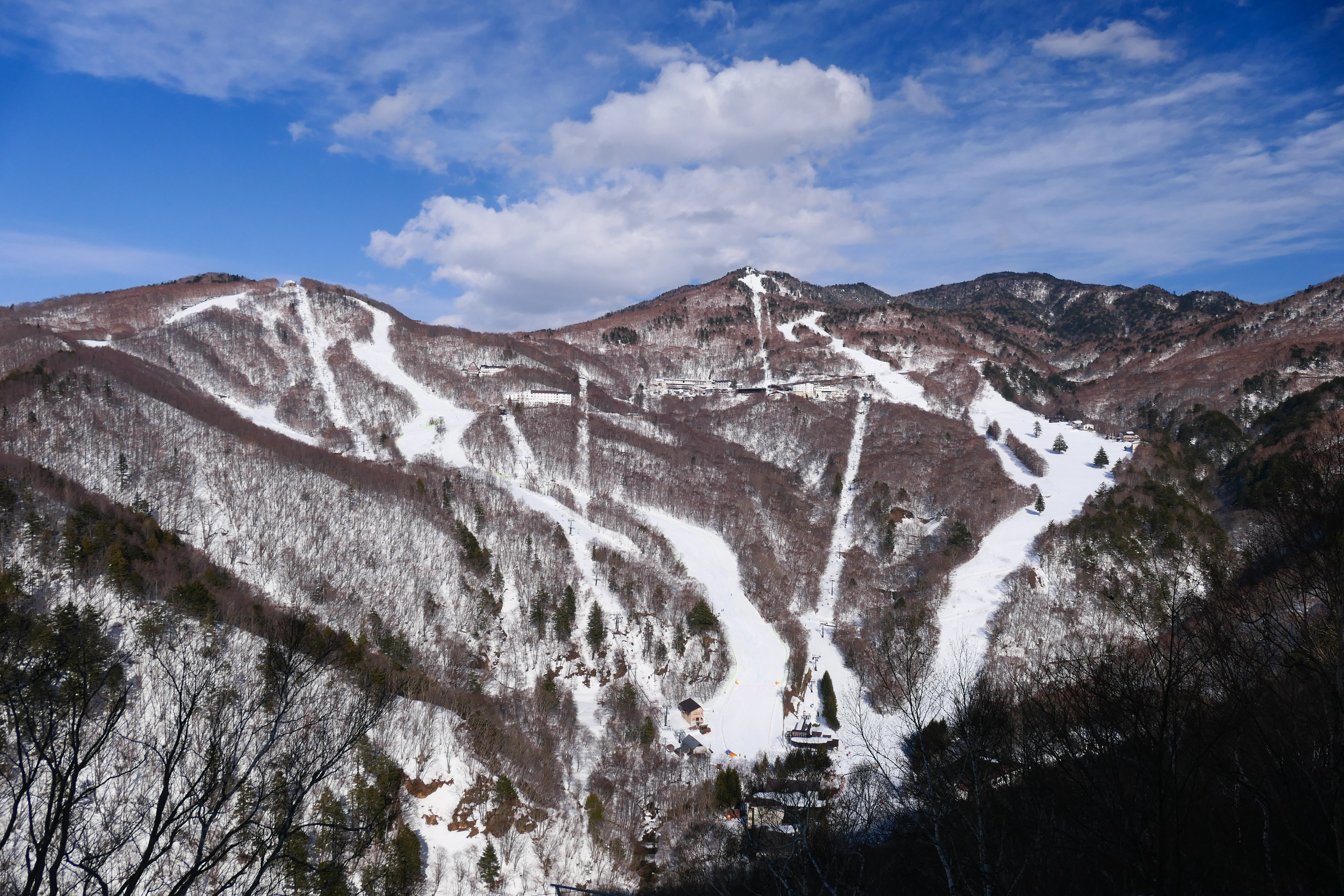
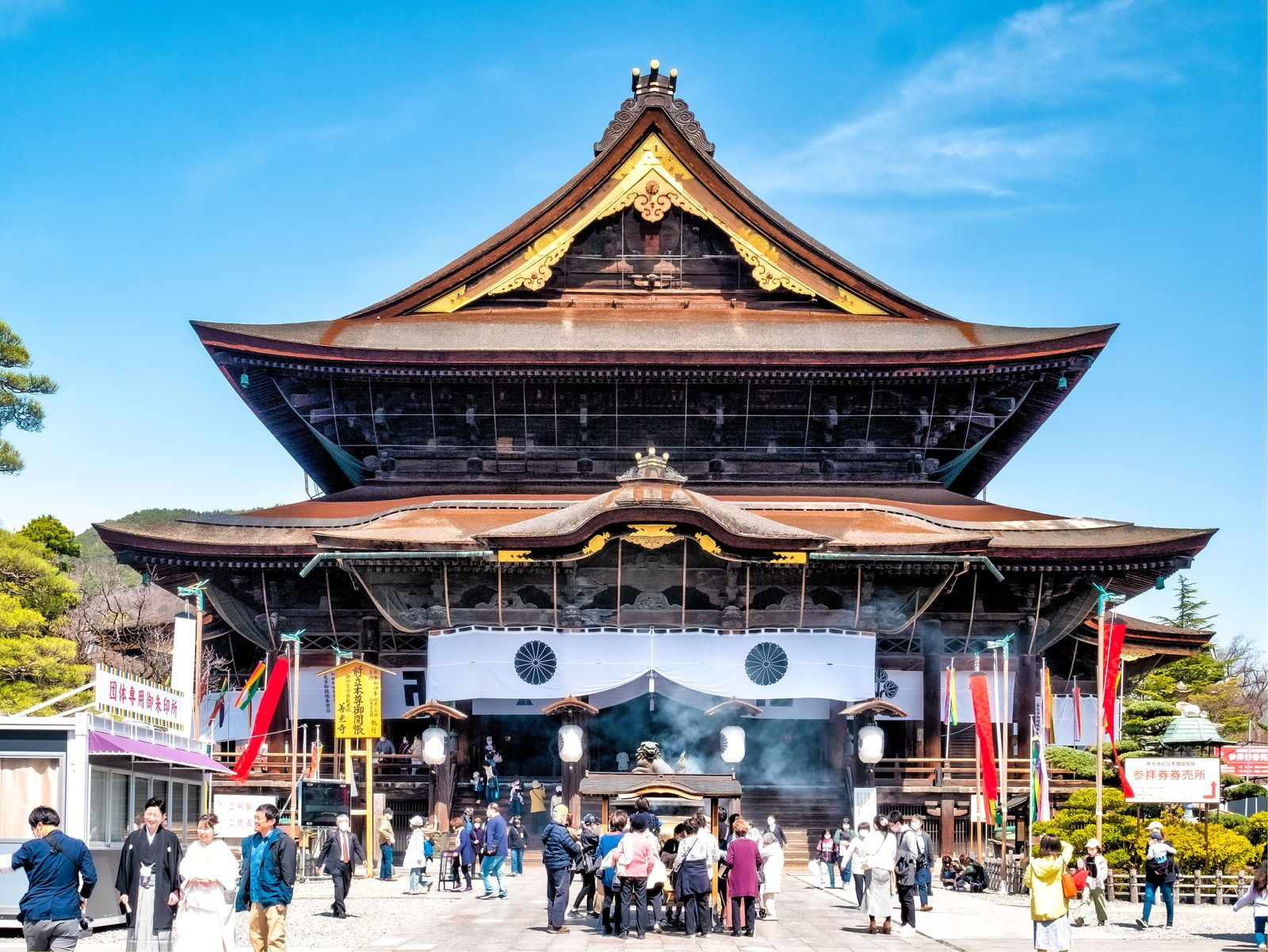
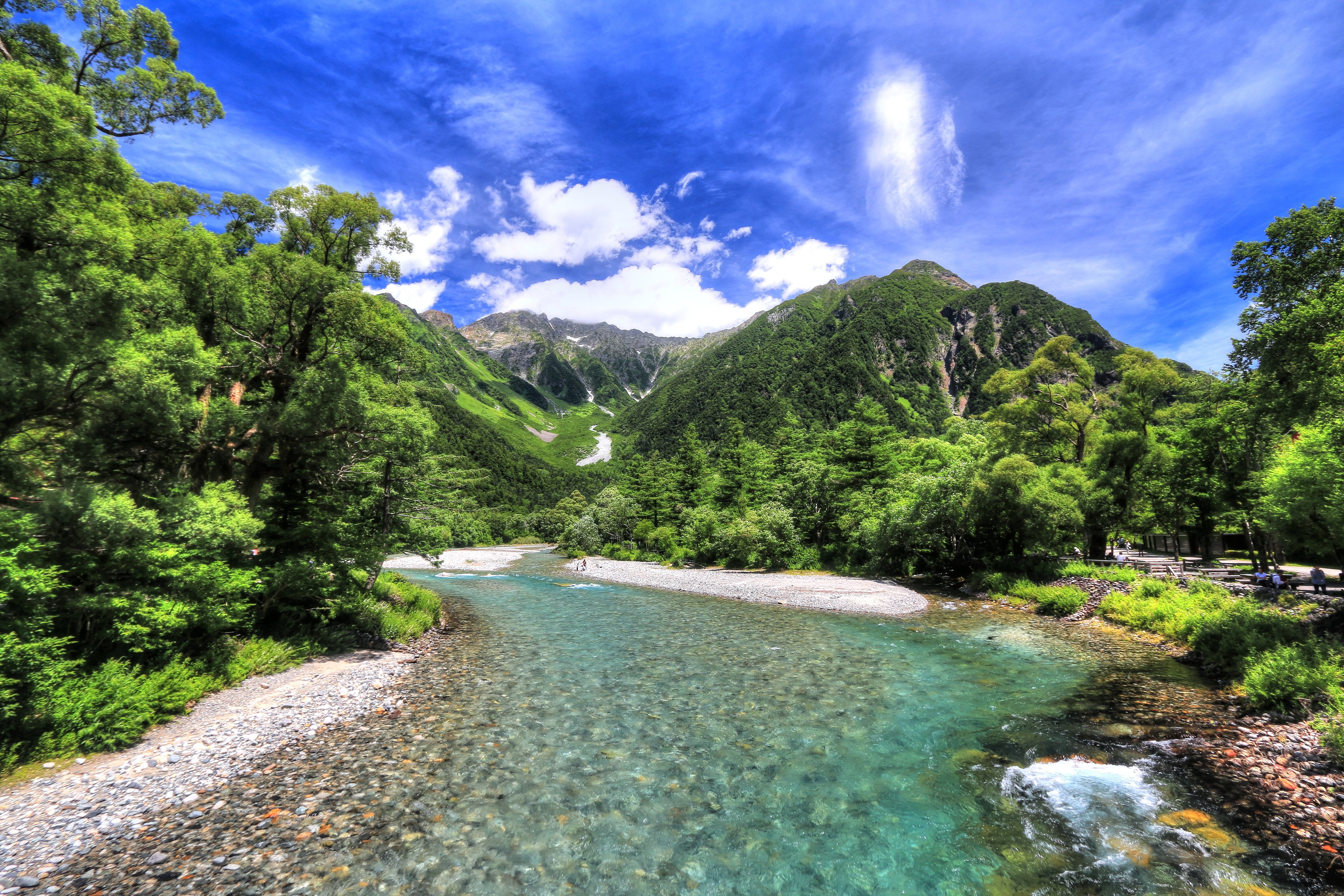
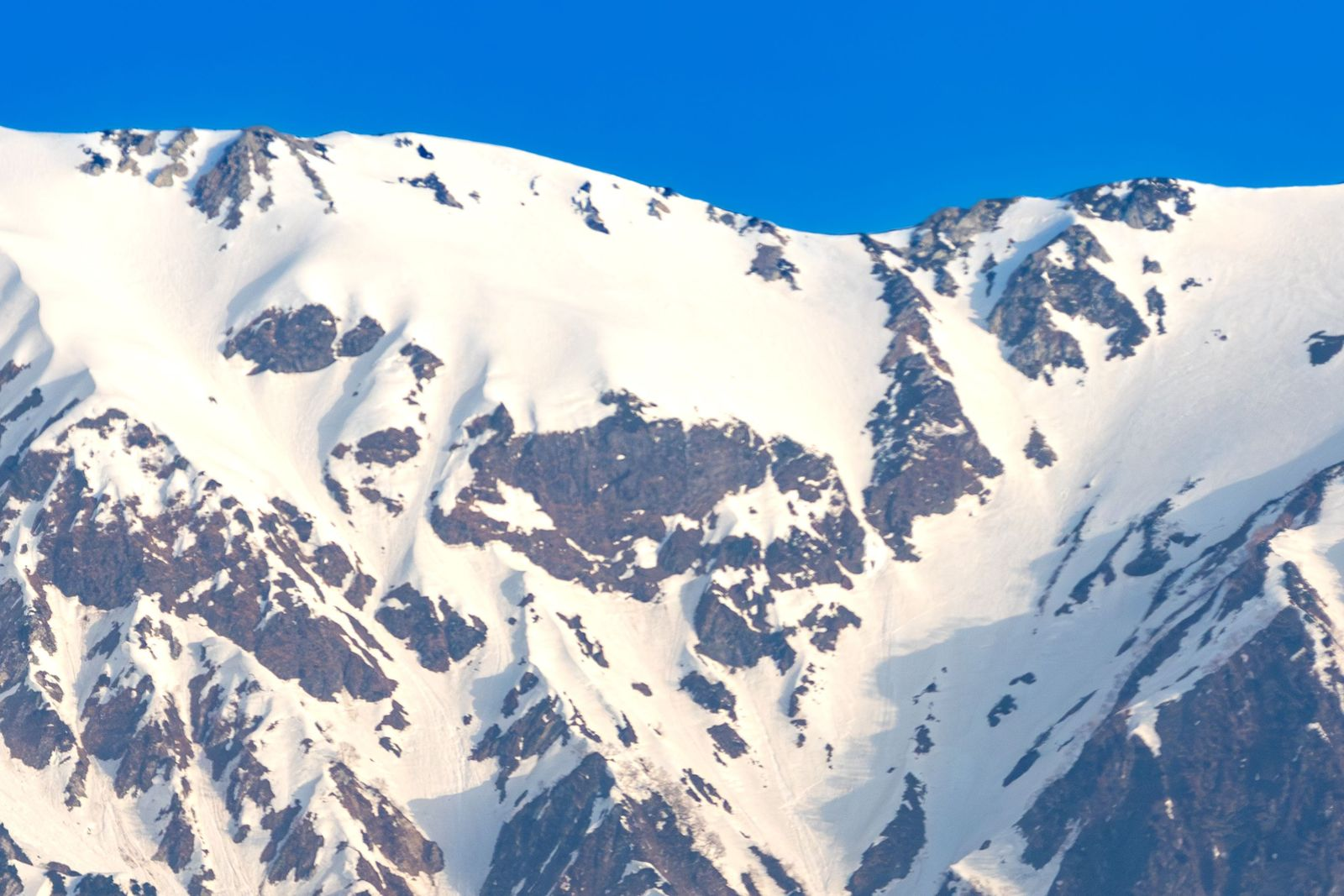
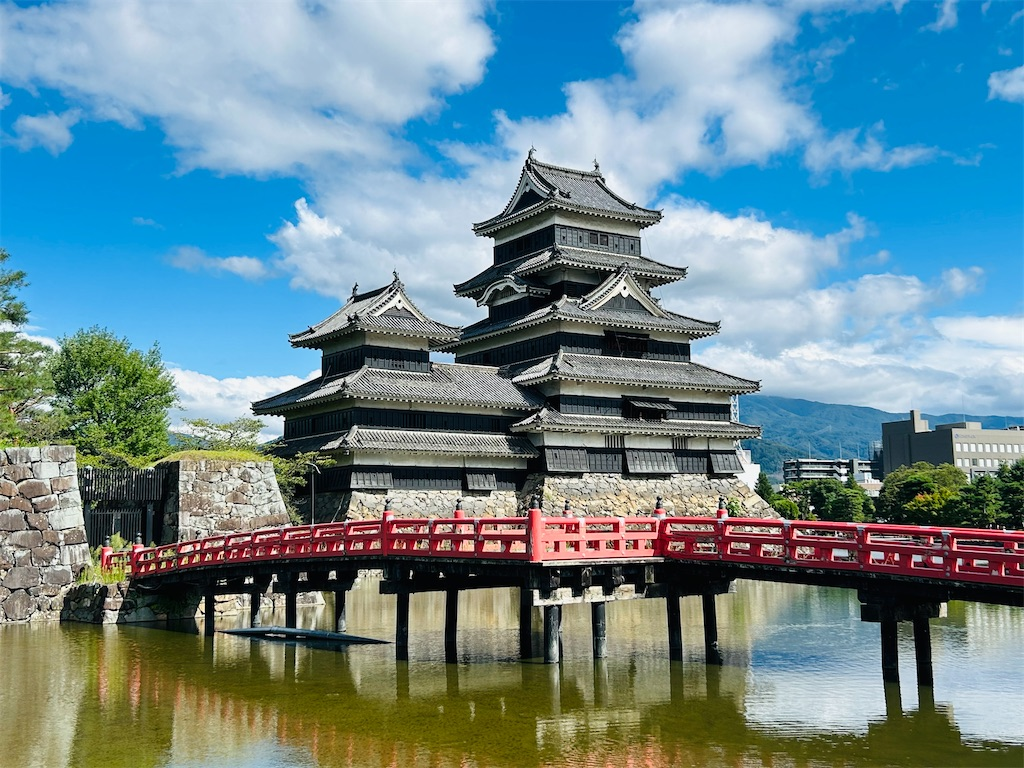
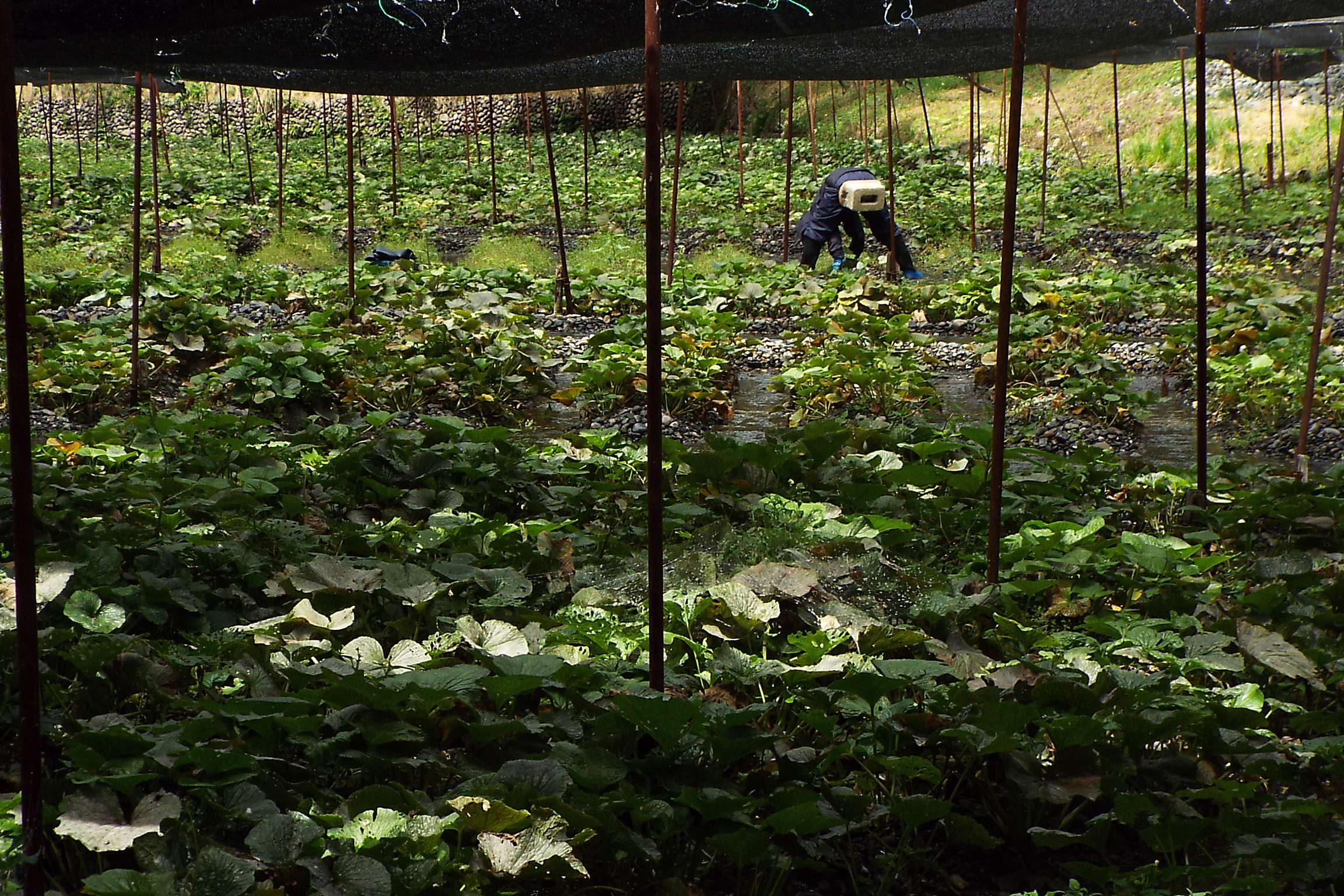
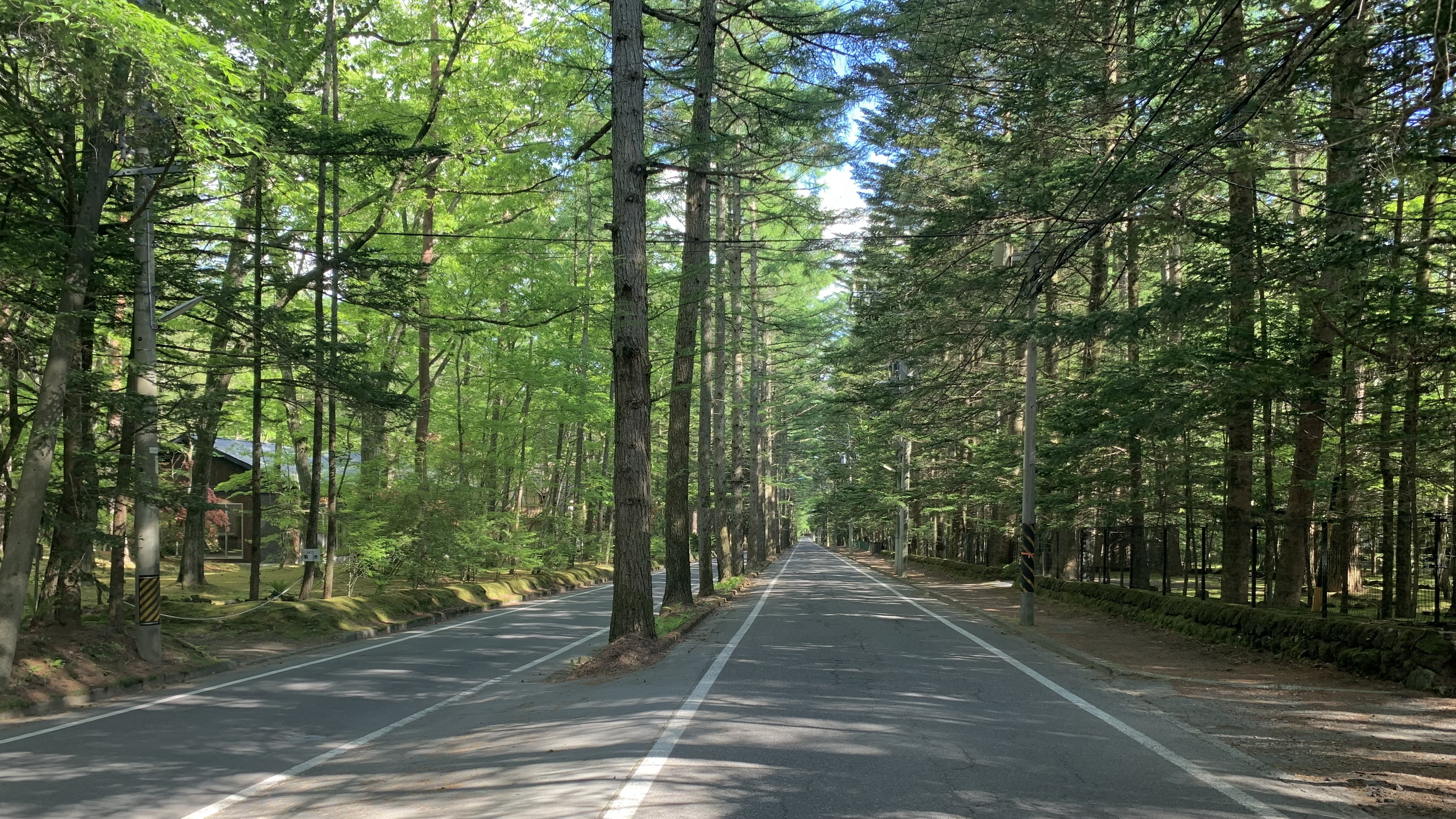
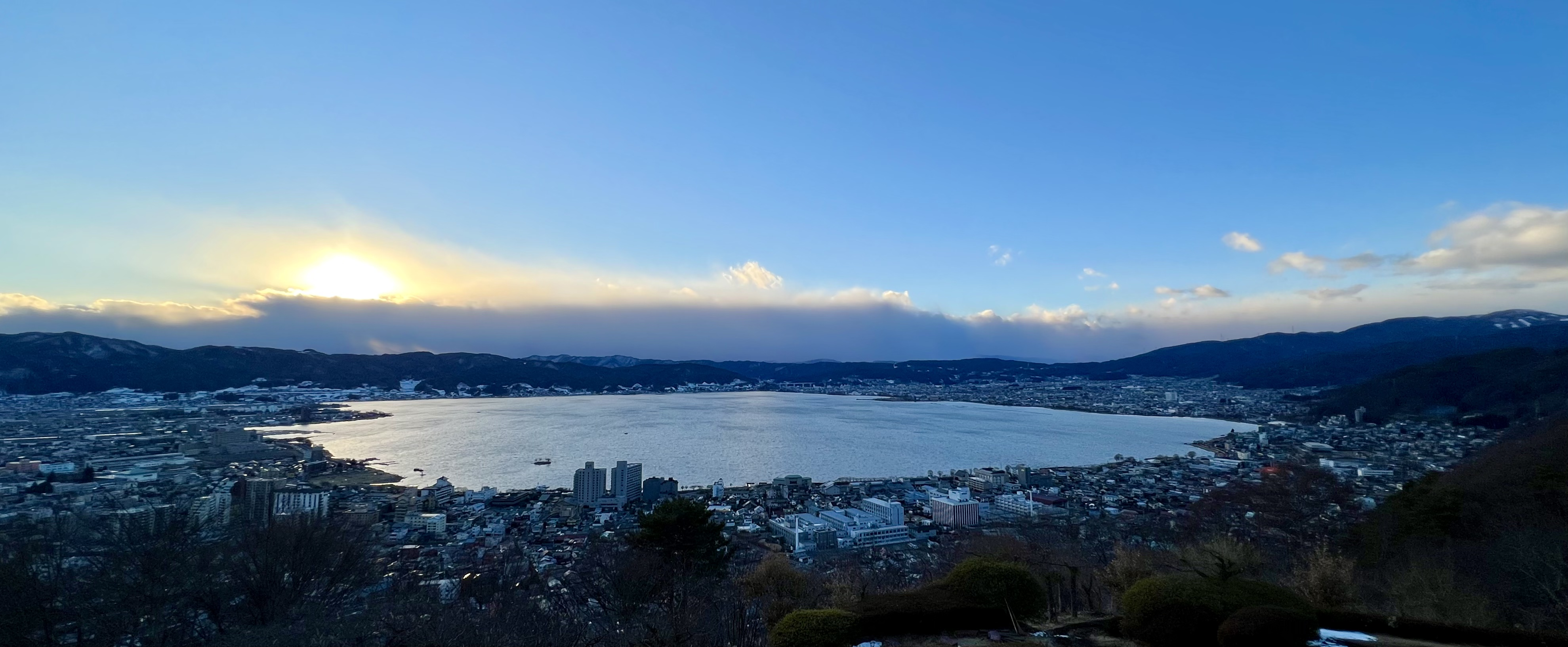
- Shiga Highlands Ski Resort Zenkō-ji Kamikōchi A spring view of Mount Shirouma Matsumoto Castle Daio Wasabi Farm Larix kaempferi Street in Karuizawa Lake Suwa

- Flag Symbol
- Anthem: Shinano no Kuni
- Coordinates: 36°15′N 138°6′E
- Country: Japan
- Region: Chūbu (Kōshin'etsu)
- Island: Honshu
- Capital: Nagano
- Subdivisions: Districts: 14, Municipalities: 77

Government
  - Governor: Shuichi Abe

Area
  - Total: 13,561.56 km^{2} (5,236.15 sq mi)
  - Rank: 4th

Population (July 1, 2023)
  - Total: 2,007,682
  - Rank: 16th
  - Density: 148.0421/km^{2} (383.4273/sq mi)

GDP
  - Total: JP¥8,918 billion US$65.9 billion (2022)
- ISO 3166 code: JP-20
- Website: www.pref.nagano.lg.jp
- Symbols of Japan
- Bird: Rock ptarmigan (Lagopus muta)
- Flower: Gentian (Gentiana scabra var. buergeri)
- Tree: White birch (Betula platyphylla var. japonica)

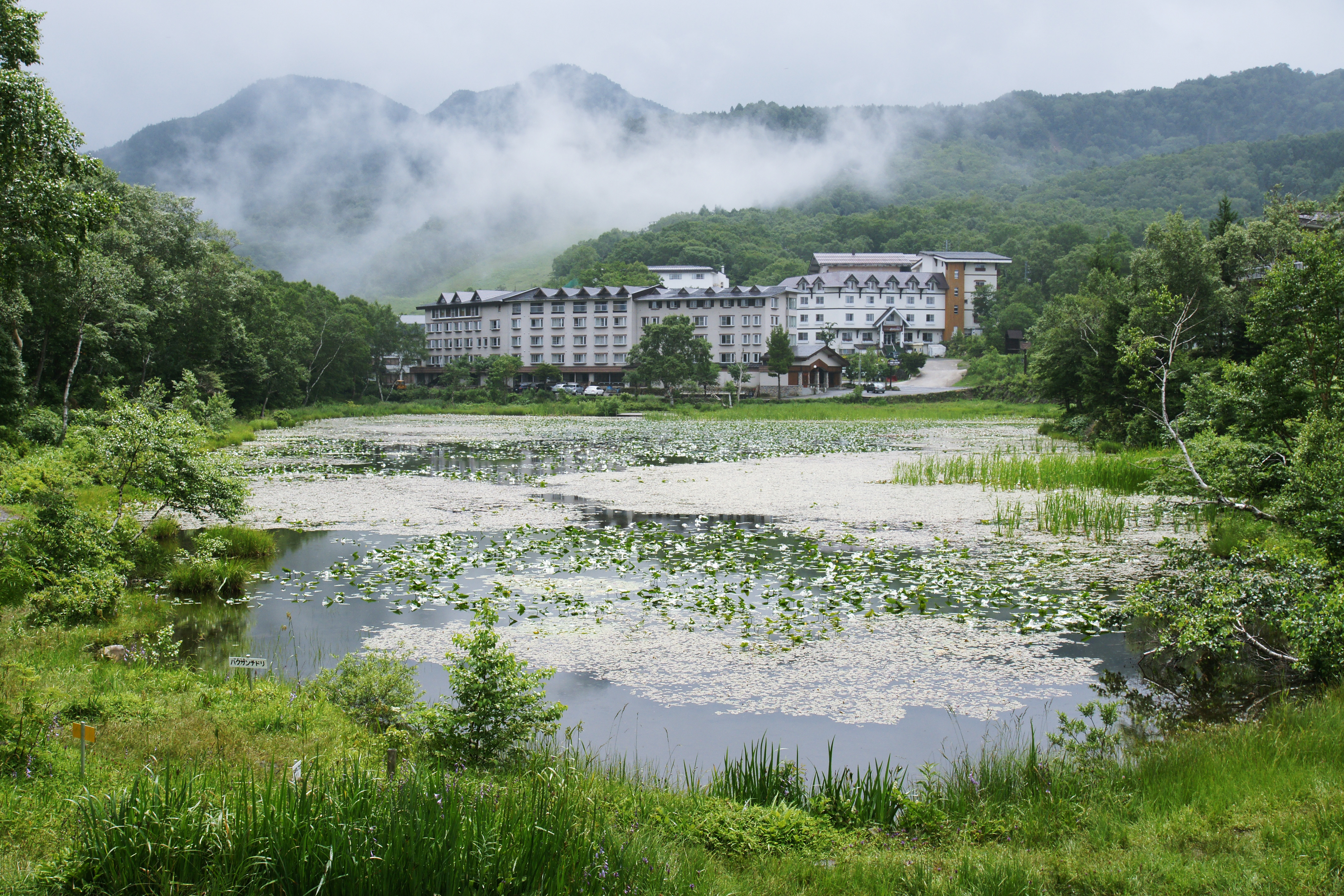
Hasuike Resort on the Shiga Plateau in Yamanouchi

Nagano Prefecture (長野県, Nagano-ken; Japanese pronunciation: [nä́.ɡä̀.nò̞, -ŋä̀.nò̞, nä̀.ɡä́.nó̞.kè̞ɴ̀, -ŋä́.nó̞-], locally [nä̀.ŋä́.nó̞]) is a landlocked prefecture of Japan located in the Chūbu region of Honshu. It has a population of 2,007,682 as of 1 July 2023 and a geographic area of 13,561.56 square kilometres (5,236.15 sq mi). It borders Niigata Prefecture to the north, Gunma Prefecture to the northeast, Saitama Prefecture to the east, Yamanashi Prefecture to the southeast, Shizuoka Prefecture and Aichi Prefecture to the south, and Gifu Prefecture and Toyama Prefecture to the west.

Nagano is the prefecture's capital and largest city, with other major cities including Matsumoto, Ueda, and Iida. The prefecture is known for its impressive highland areas of the Japanese Alps, including most of the Hida Mountains, Kiso Mountains, and Akaishi Mountains, which extend into neighbouring prefectures; it contains nine of the twelve highest mountains in Japan. Its mountain ranges, natural scenery, and history have gained the prefecture international recognition as a winter sports tourist destination, and it received further attention as the host of the 1998 Winter Olympics. It is served by the Hokuriku Shinkansen railway line with direct services to Tokyo, Toyama, and Kanazawa.

== Geography ==
Nagano Prefecture is landlocked and borders more prefectures than any other in Japan: Niigata Prefecture to the north, Gunma Prefecture to the northeast, Saitama Prefecture to the east, Yamanashi Prefecture to the southeast, Shizuoka Prefecture and Aichi Prefecture to the south, and Gifu Prefecture and Toyama Prefecture to the west. It contains the point furthest from the sea in all of Japan, located in the city of Saku. Its mountains have made it relatively isolated, and many visitors come for its mountain resorts and hot springs. Nine of the twelve highest mountains in Japan can be found in Nagano and one of its lakes, Lake Kizaki, is a beach resort popular for its water attractions and games. The climate is predominantly alpine with warm summers, cold snowy winters, and less intense humidity than the lower coastal areas.

As of 1 April 2014, 21% of the total land area of the prefecture are natural parks, namely the Chichibu Tama Kai, Chūbu-Sangaku, Jōshin'etsu-kōgen, and Minami Alps national parks; Myōgi-Arafune-Saku Kōgen, Tenryū-Okumikawa, and Yatsugatake-Chūshin Kōgen quasi-national parks; and Chūō Alps, Enrei Ōjō, Hijiriyama Kōgen, Mibugawa Suikei, Ontake, and Tenryū Koshibu Suikei prefectural natural parks.

=== Cities ===
Physical map of Nagano Prefecture

Political map of Nagano Prefecture City Town Village

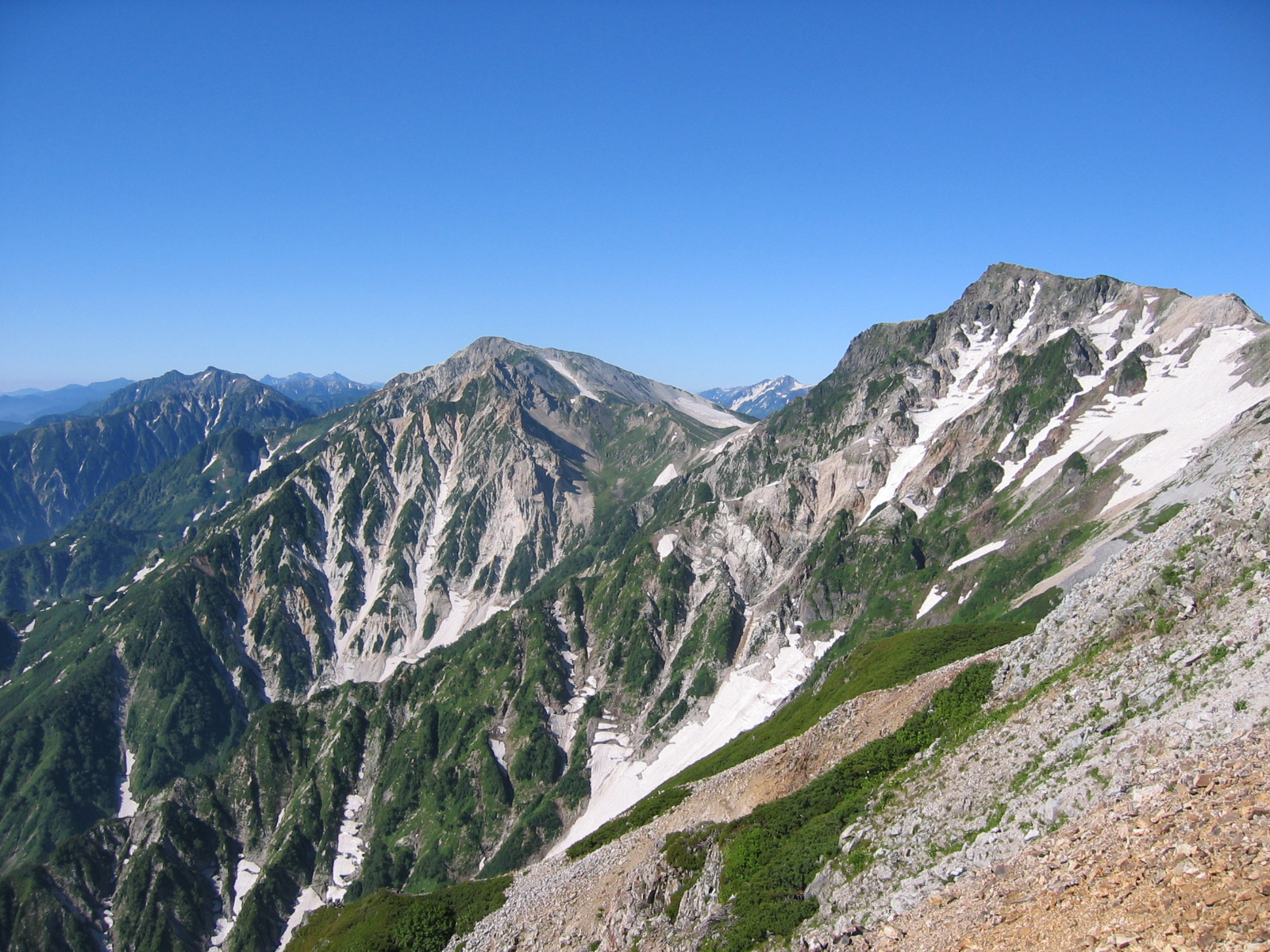
Hida Mountains (August 2006)

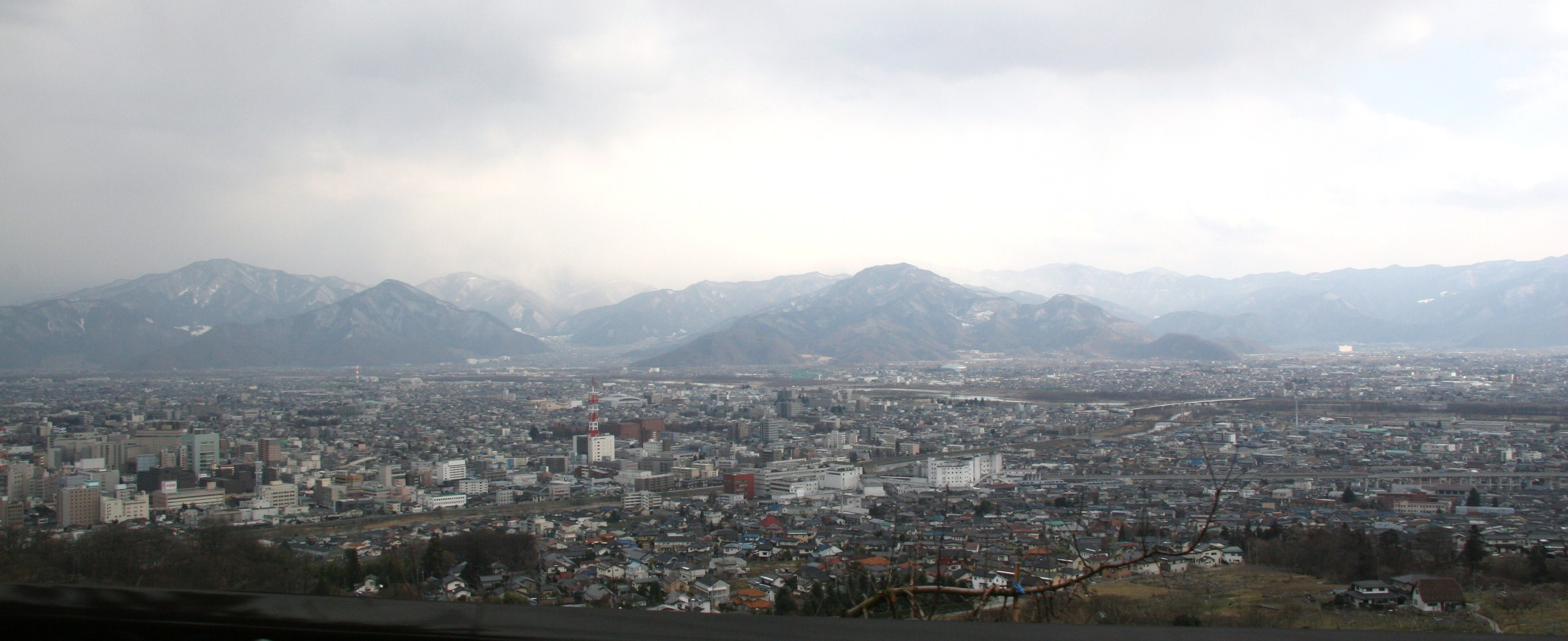
Nagano City

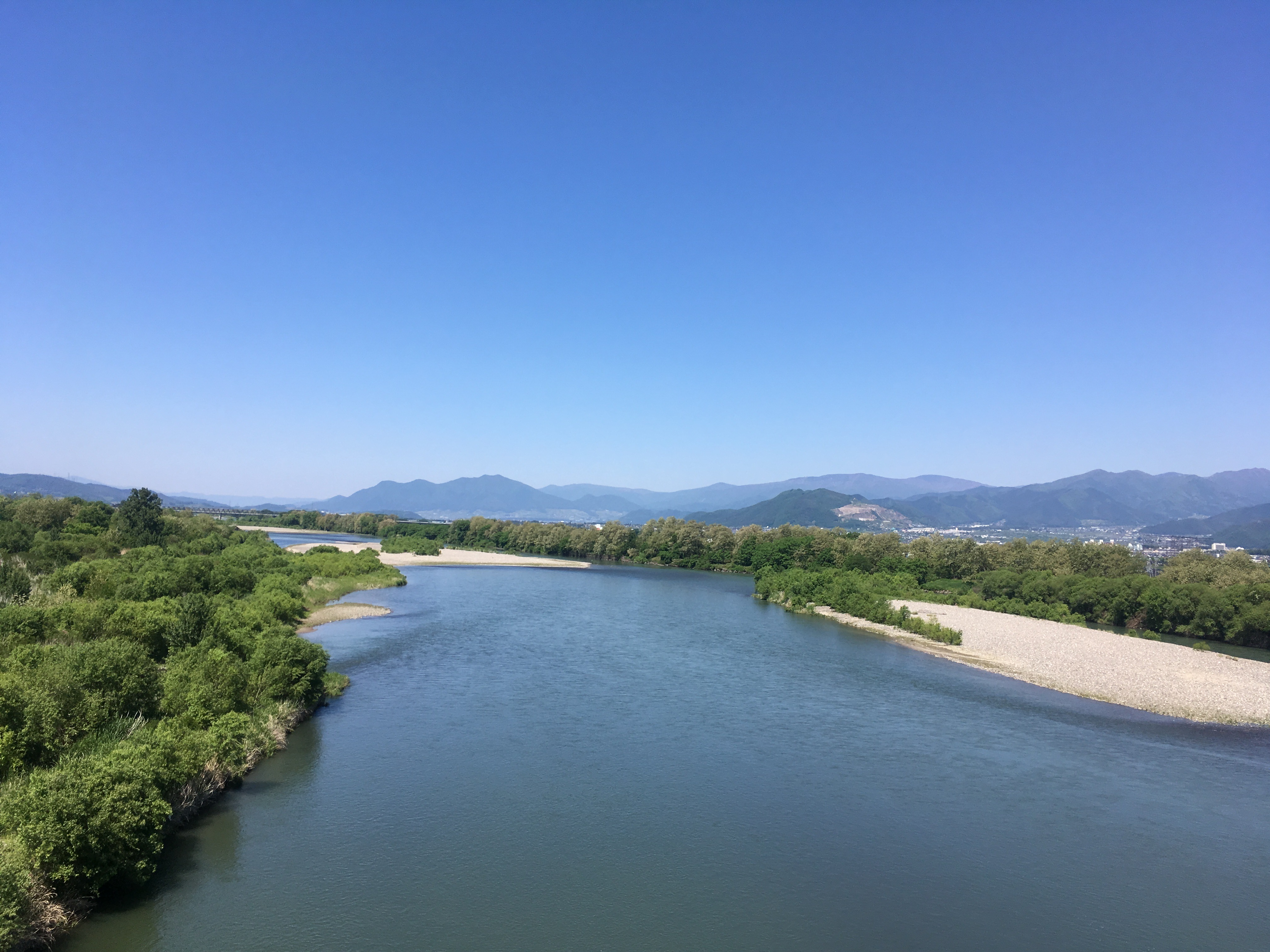
Chikuma River, from Yashima Bridge, looking downstream toward Murayama Bridge, Nagano (city)

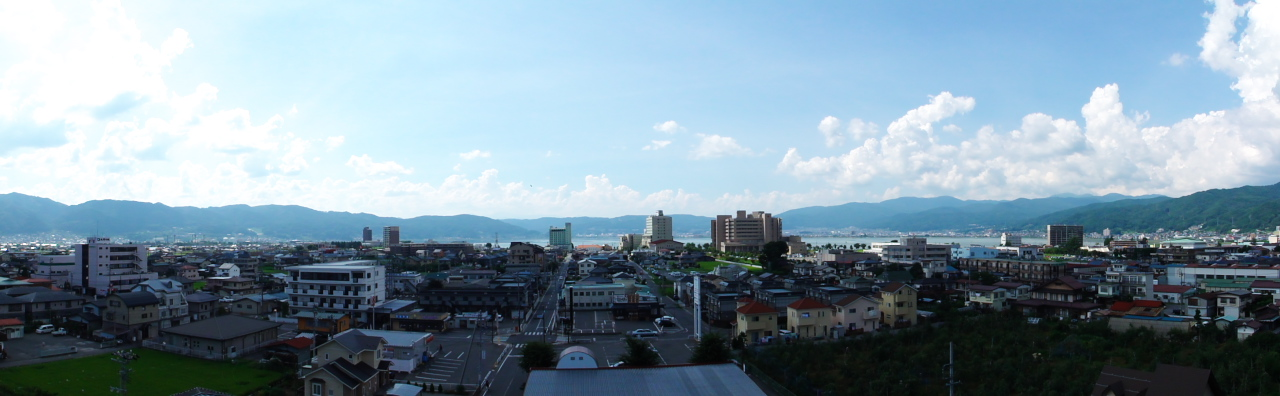
Suwa

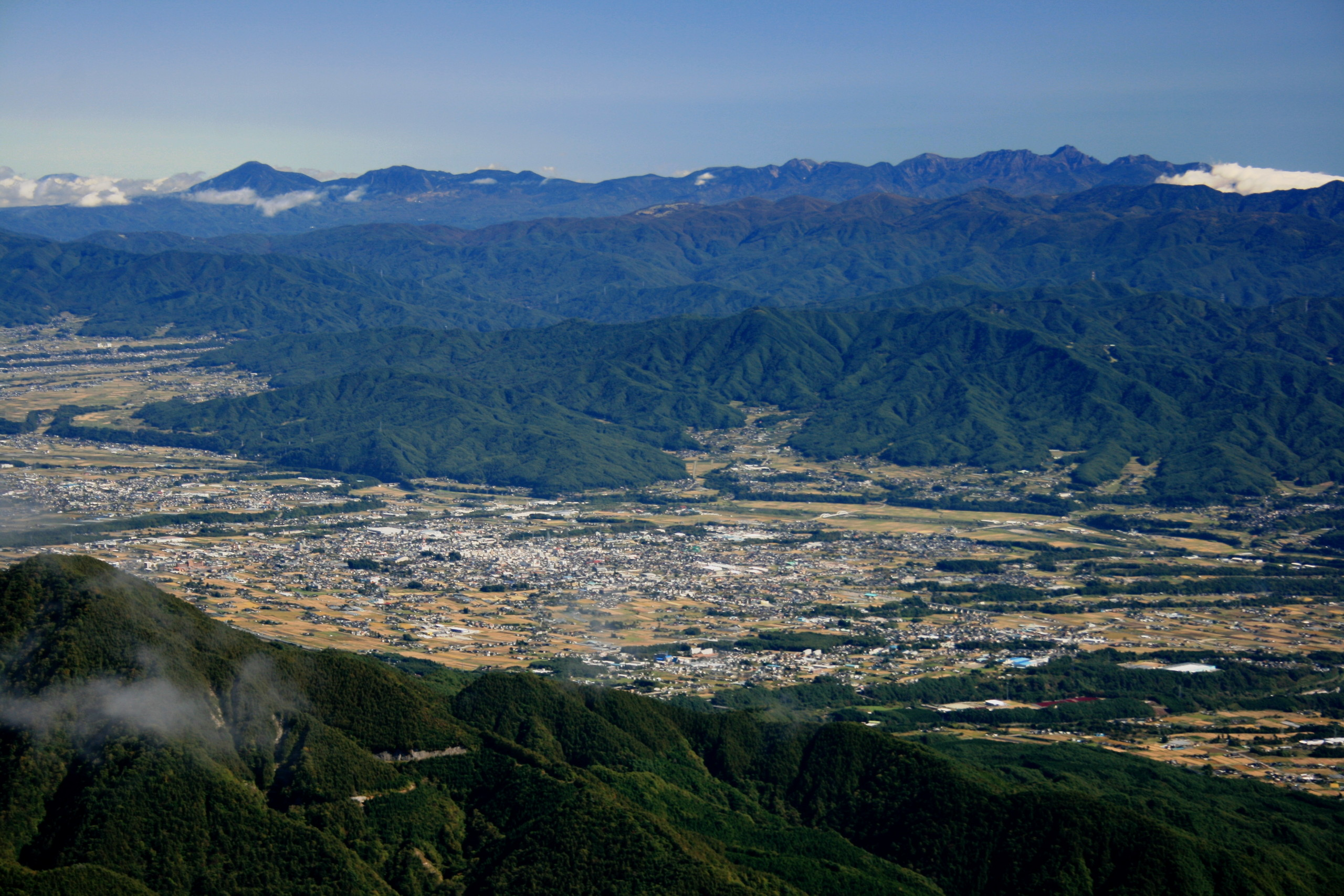
Komagane

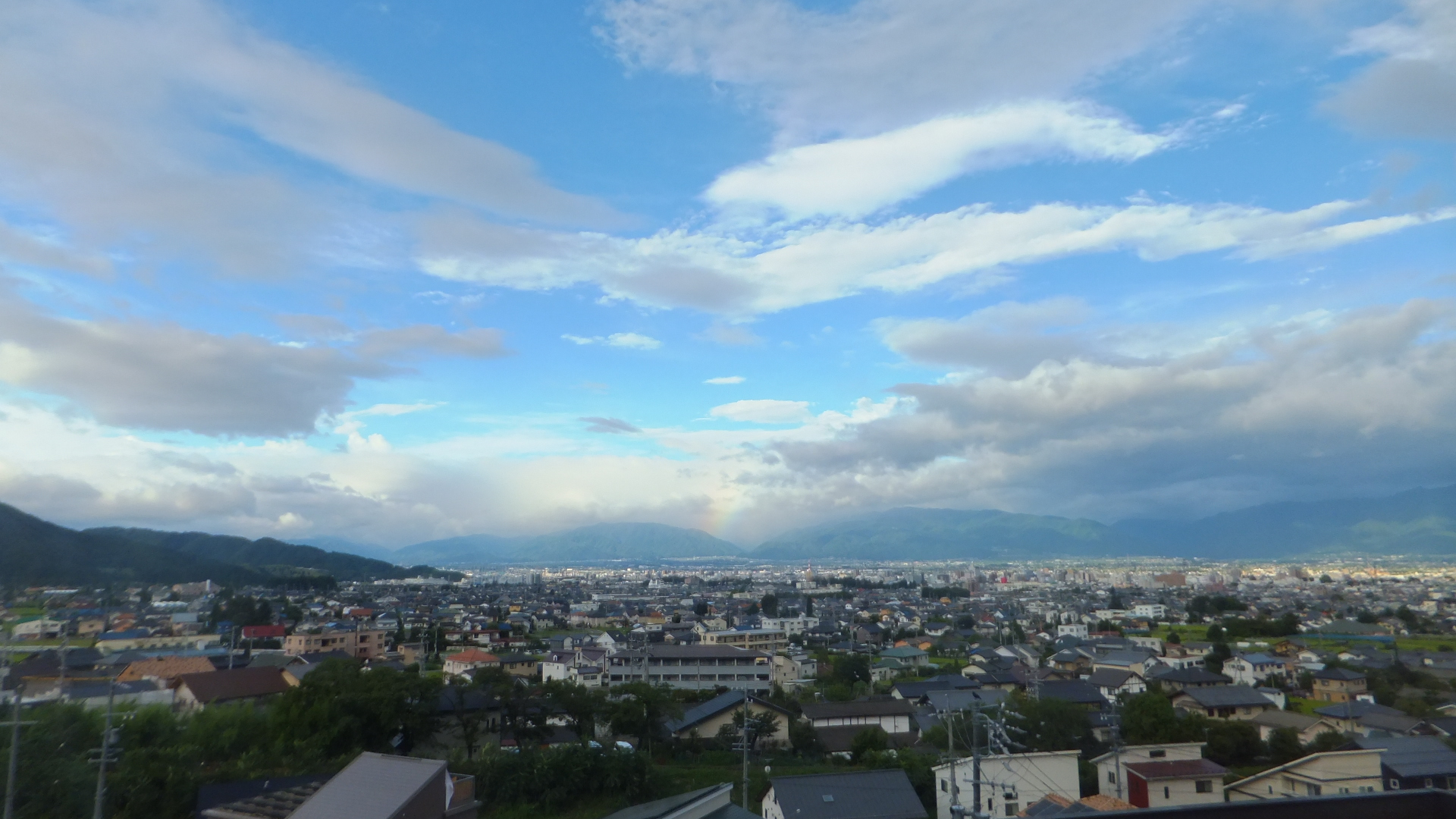
Matsumoto

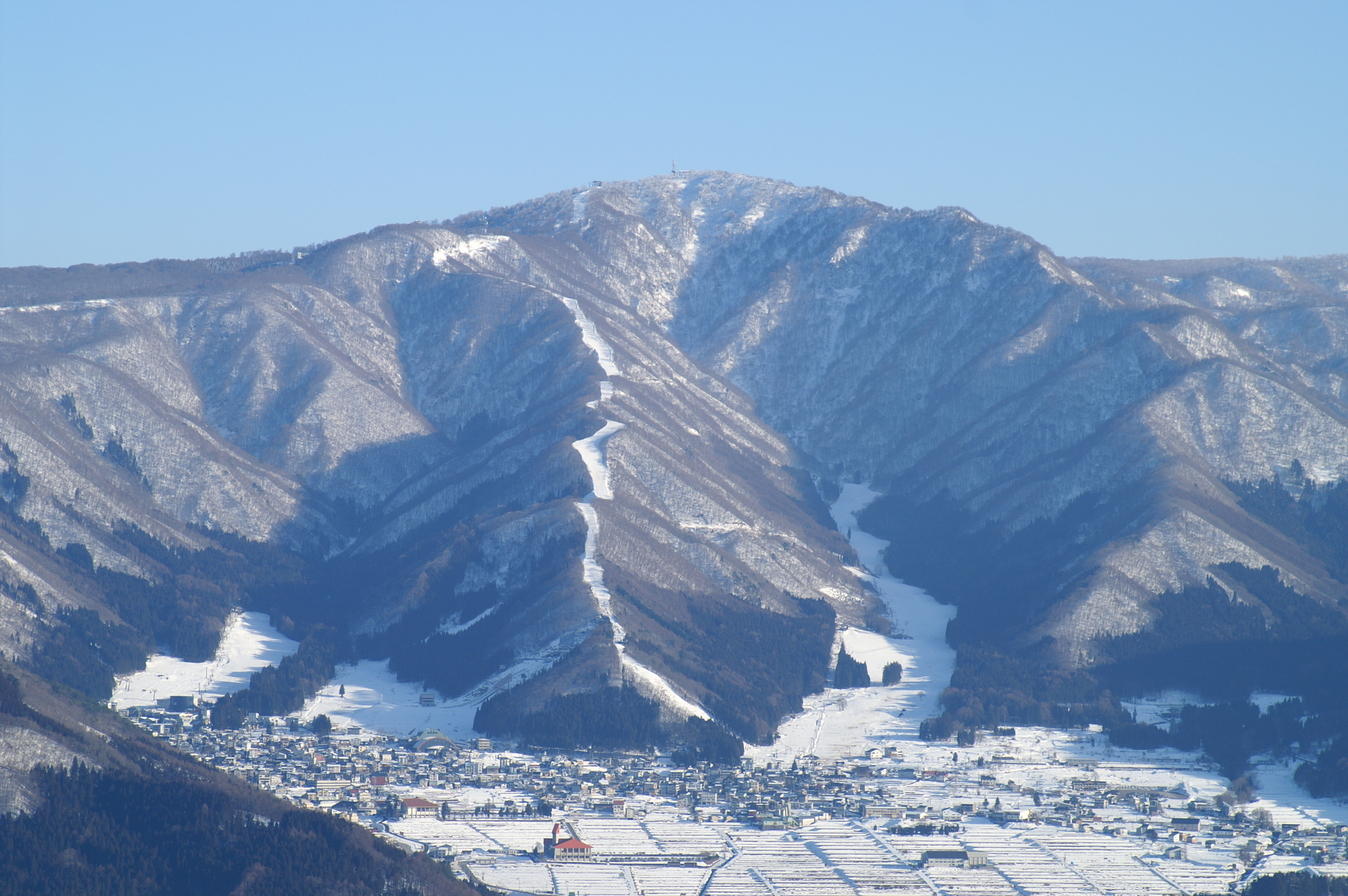
Nozawaonsen, Nagano

Nineteen cities are located in Nagano Prefecture:

Name		Area (km^{2})	Population	Map
Rōmaji	Kanji	Area (km^{2})	Population	Map
Azumino	安曇野市	331.78	97,800	
Chikuma	千曲市	119.79	58,124	
Chino	茅野市	266.59	55,673	
Iida	飯田市	658.66	101,536	
Iiyama	飯山市	202.43	20,118	
Ina	伊那市	667.93	68,177	
Komagane	駒ヶ根市	165.86	32,210	
Komoro	小諸市	98.55	42,489	
Matsumoto	松本市	978.47	235,972	
Nagano (capital)	長野市	834.81	365,296	
Nakano	中野市	112.18	42,664	
Okaya	岡谷市	85.10	48,616	
Ōmachi	大町市	565.15	27,559	
Saku	佐久市	423.51	97,454	
Shiojiri	塩尻市	289.98	67,240	
Suwa	諏訪市	109.17	48,972	
Suzaka	須坂市	149.67	50,828	
Tōmi	東御市	112.37	29,440	
Ueda	上田市	552.04	157,480	

=== Towns and villages ===
These are the towns and villages in each district:

Name		Area (km^{2})	Population	District	Map
Rōmaji	Kanji	Area (km^{2})	Population	District	Map
Achi	阿智村	214.43	6,379	Shimoina District	
Agematsu	上松町	168.42	4,451	Kiso District	
Anan	阿南町	123.07	4,616	Shimoina District	
Aoki	青木村	57.10	4,360	Chiisagata District	
Asahi	朝日村	70.62	4,569	Higashichikuma District	
Chikuhoku	筑北村	99.47	4,688	Higashichikuma District	
Fujimi	富士見町	144.76	14,485	Suwa District	
Hakuba	白馬村	189.36	9,007	Kitaazumi District	
Hara	原村	43.26	7,661	Suwa District	
Hiraya	平谷村	77.37	414	Shimoina District	
Iijima	飯島町	86.96	9,446	Kamiina District	
Iizuna	飯綱町	75.00	11,115	Kamiminochi District	
Ikeda	池田町	40.16	9,382	Kitaazumi District	
Ikusaka	生坂村	39.05	1,743	Higashichikuma District	
Karuizawa	軽井沢町	156.03	21,834	Kitasaku District	
Kawakami	川上村	209.61	4,009	Minamisaku District	
Kijimadaira	木島平村	99.32	4,468	Shimotakai District	
Kiso	木曽町	476.03	11,045	Kiso District	
Kiso	木祖村	140.50	2,877	Kiso District	
Kitaaiki	北相木村	56.32	755	Minamisaku District	
Koumi	小海町	114.20	4,676	Minamisaku District	
Matsukawa	松川町	72.79	13,043	Shimoina District	
Matsukawa	松川村	47.07	9,689	Kitaazumi District	
Minamiaiki	南相木村	66.05	1,057	Minamisaku District	
Minamimaki	南牧村	133.09	2,924	Minamisaku District	
Minamiminowa	南箕輪村	40.99	15,463	Kamiina District	
Minowa	箕輪町	85.91	25,051	Kamiina District	
Miyada	宮田村	54.50	9,051	Kamiina District	
Miyota	御代田町	58.76	15,562	Kitasaku District	
Nagawa	長和町	183.86	6,088	Chiisagata District	
Nagiso	南木曽町	215.93	4,111	Kiso District	
Nakagawa	中川村	77.05	4,910	Kamiina District	
Neba	根羽村	89.97	890	Shimoina District	
Nozawaonsen	野沢温泉村	57.96	3,653	Shimotakai District	
Obuse	小布施町	19.12	10,999	Kamitakai District	
Ogawa	小川村	58.11	2,585	Kamiminochi District	
Ōkuwa	大桑村	234.47	3,693	Kiso District	
Omi	麻績村	34.38	2,738	Higashichikuma District	
Ōshika	大鹿村	248.28	977	Shimoina District	
Ōtaki	王滝村	310.82	753	Kiso District	
Otari	小谷村	267.91	2,914	Kitaazumi District	
Sakae	栄村	271.66	1,828	Shimominochi District	
Sakaki	坂城町	53.64	15,025	Hanishina District	
Sakuho	佐久穂町	188.15	11,076	Minamisaku District	
Shimojō	下條村	38.12	3,545	Shimoina District	
Shimosuwa	下諏訪町	66.87	20,055	Suwa District	
Shinano	信濃町	149.30	8,339	Kamiminochi District	
Takagi	喬木村	66.61	6,117	Shimoina District	
Takamori	高森町	45.36	13,067	Shimoina District	
Takayama	高山村	98.56	7,101	Kamitakai District	
Tateshina	立科町	66.87	7,147	Kitasaku District	
Tatsuno	辰野町	169.20	18,951	Kamiina District	
Tenryū	天龍村	109.44	1,275	Shimoina District	
Toyooka	豊丘村	76.79	6,704	Shimoina District	
Urugi	売木村	43.43	552	Shimoina District	
Yamagata	山形村	24.98	8,726	Higashichikuma District	
Yamanouchi	山ノ内町	265.90	12,403	Shimotakai District	
Yasuoka	泰阜村	64.59	1,622	Shimoina District	

== Demographics ==
Nagano Prefecture population pyramid in 2020

Historical population
Year	Pop.	±% p.a.
1880	1,000,414	—
1890	1,146,071	+1.37%
1903	1,348,556	+1.26%
1913	1,484,205	+0.96%
1920	1,562,722	+0.74%
1925	1,629,217	+0.84%
1930	1,717,118	+1.06%
1935	1,714,000	−0.04%
1940	1,710,729	−0.04%
1945	2,121,050	+4.39%
1950	2,060,831	−0.57%
1955	2,021,292	−0.39%
1960	1,981,433	−0.40%
1965	1,958,007	−0.24%
1970	1,956,917	−0.01%
1975	2,017,564	+0.61%
1980	2,083,934	+0.65%
1985	2,136,927	+0.50%
1990	2,156,627	+0.18%
1995	2,193,984	+0.34%
2000	2,215,168	+0.19%
2005	2,196,114	−0.17%
2010	2,152,449	−0.40%
2015	2,099,759	−0.49%
2020	2,052,493	−0.45%

The life expectancy in Nagano Prefecture is the highest nationwide, with an average life expectancy of 87.18 years for women and 80.88 years for men.

== Transportation ==
=== Railway ===
- Central Japan Railway Company
  - Chūō Main Line (west line)
  - Iida Line
- East Japan Railway Company
  - Chūō Main Line (east line)
  - Hokuriku Shinkansen
  - Koumi Line
  - Ōito Line (from Matsumoto to Minami-Otari)
  - Shin'etsu Main Line
  - Shinonoi Line
- Matsumoto Electric Railway
  - Kamikōchi Line
- Nagano Electric Railway
  - Nagano Line
- Shinano Railway
  - Shinano Railway Line
- Ueda Dentetsu
  - Bessho Line
- West Japan Railway Company
  - Ōito Line (from Minami-Otari to Itoigawa)
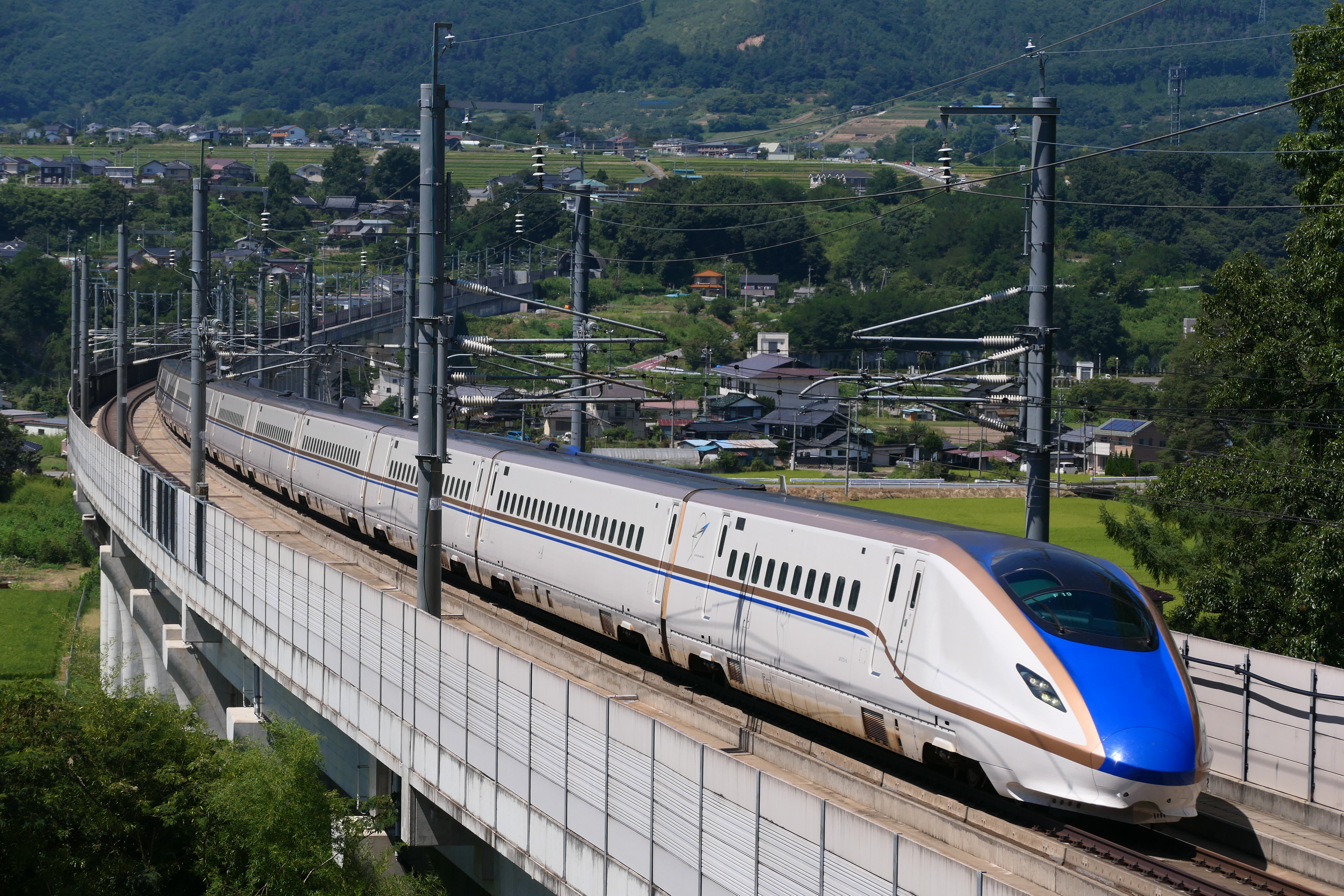
Hokuriku Shinkansen

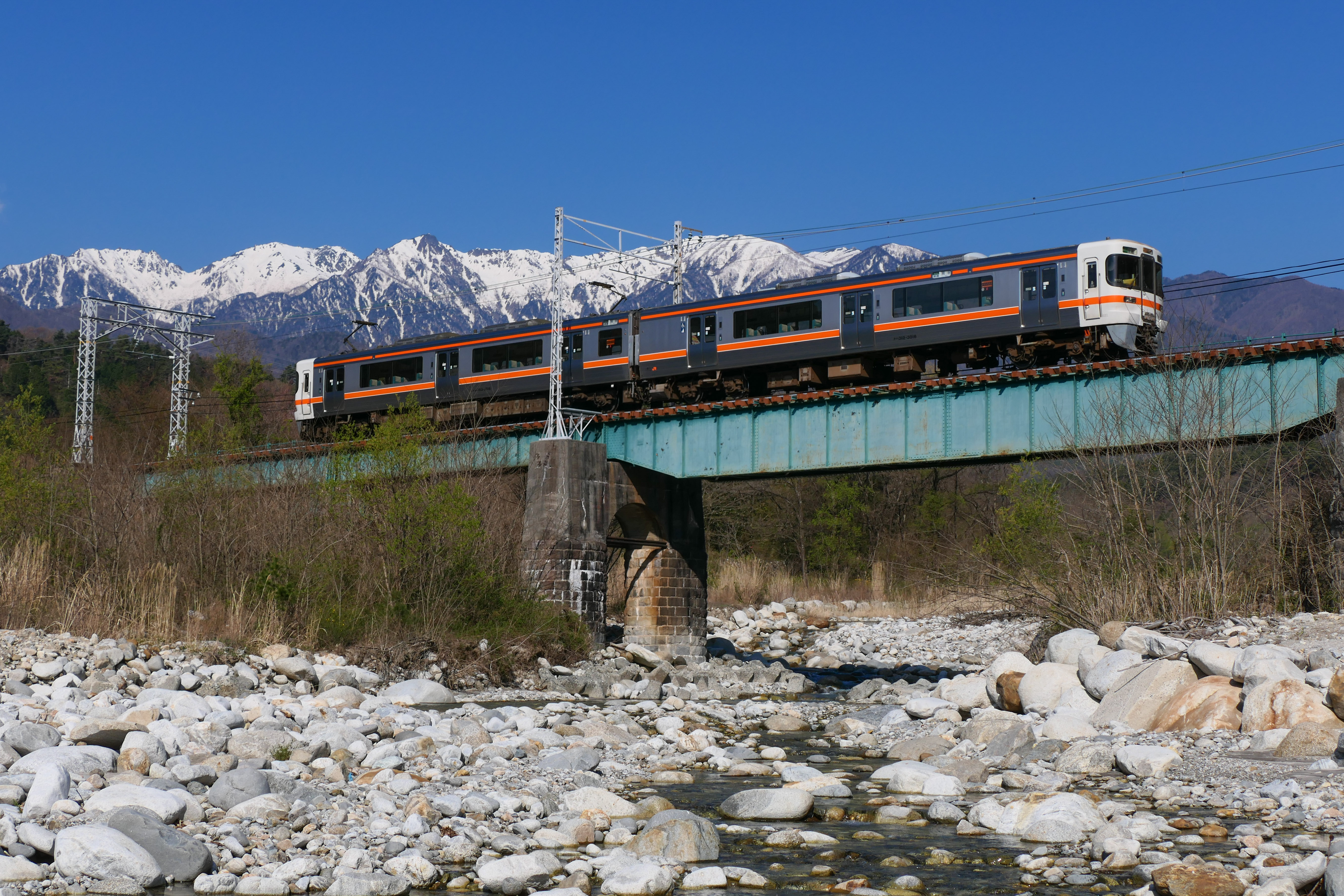
Iida Line

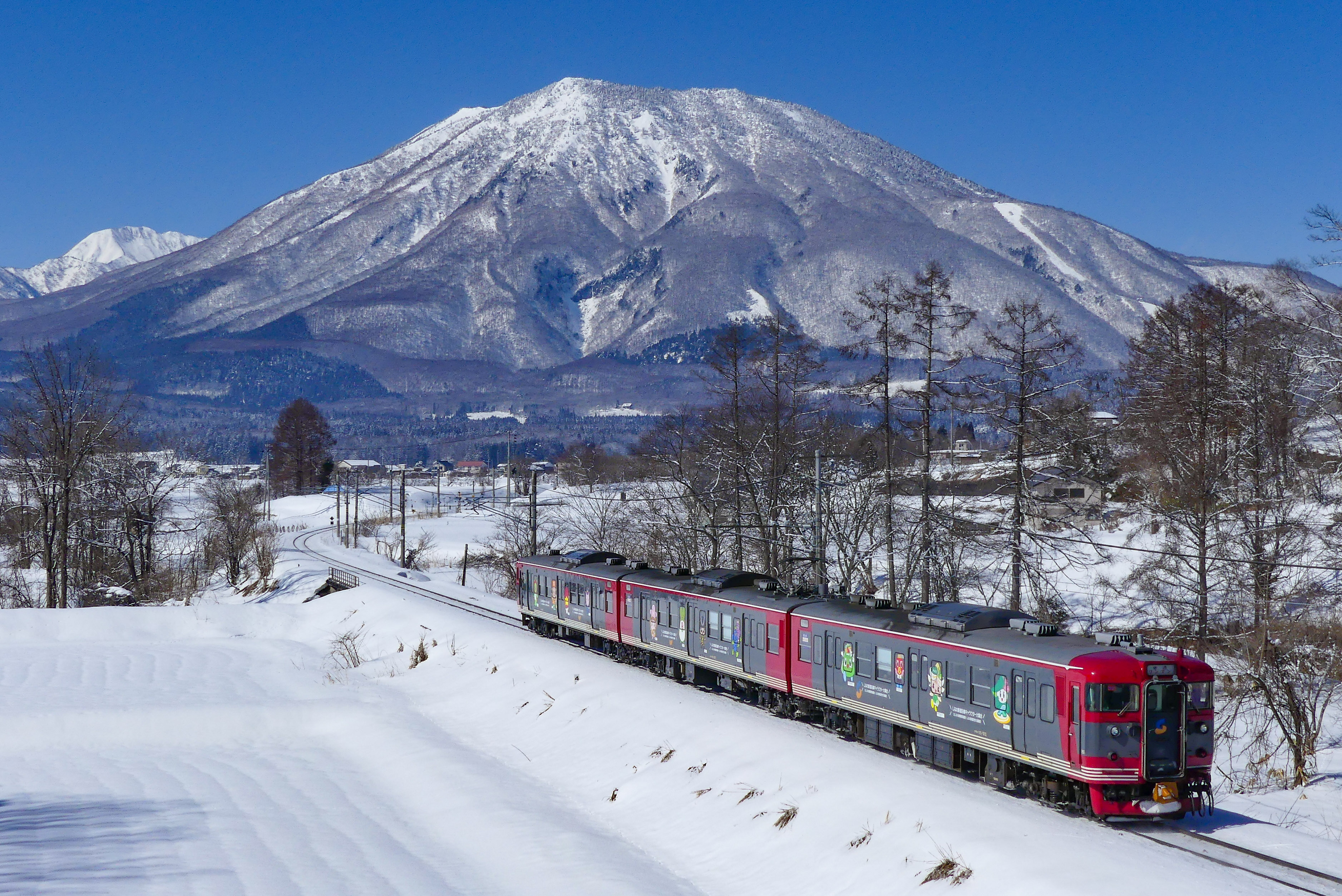
Shinano Railway

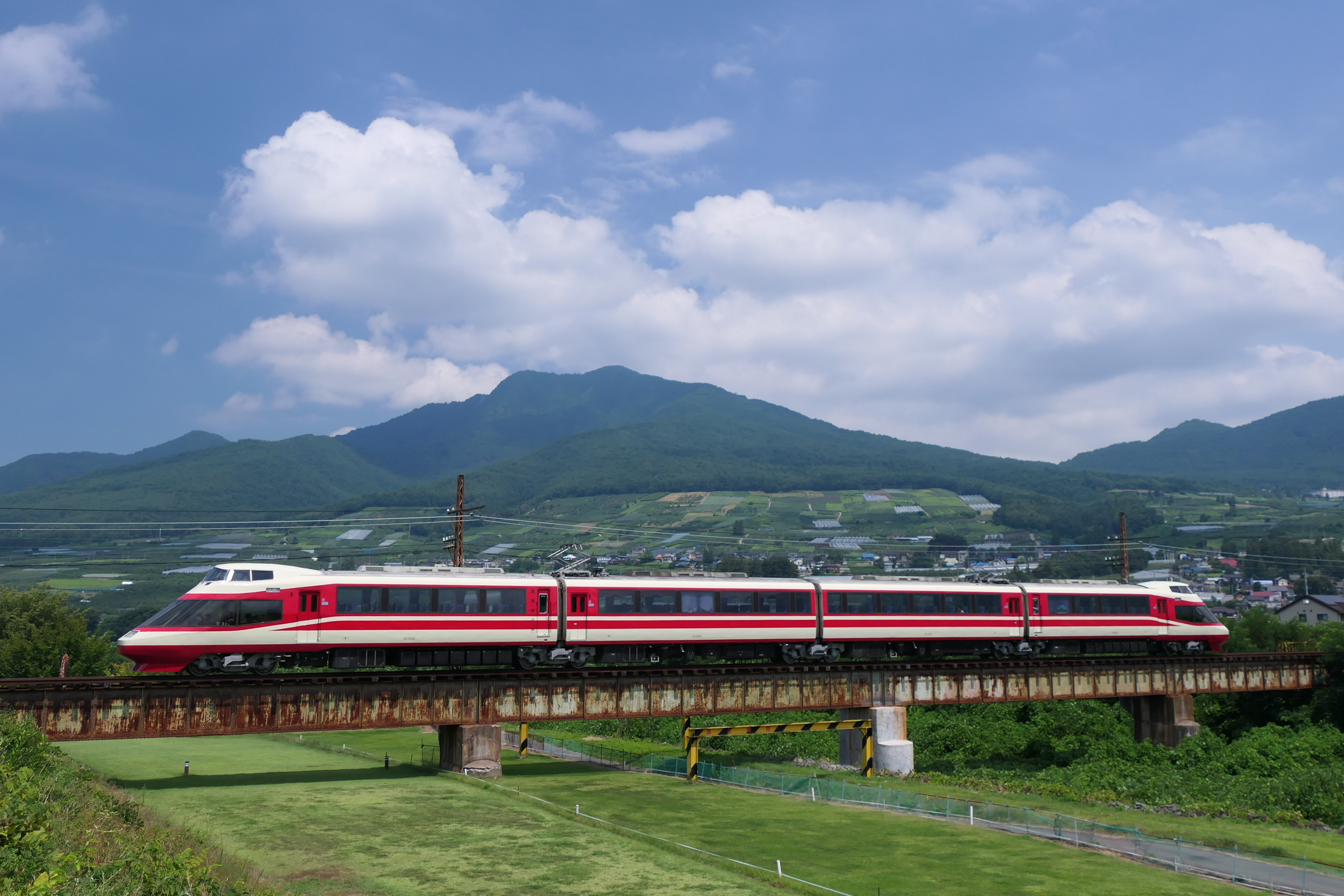
Nagano Electric Railway

=== Road ===
==== Expressways ====
- Chubu-jukan Expressway
- Chubu-odan Expressway
- Chuo Expressway
- Joshinetsu Expressway
- Nagano Expressway
- Sanen-nanshin Expressway

==== National highways ====
- Route 18
- Route 19 (Nagano-Matsumoto-Shioriri-Nagiso-Nakatsugawa-Tajimi-Nagoya)
- Route 20 (Matsumoto-Suwa-Kofu-Otsuki-Hachioji-Nihonbashi of Tokyo)
- Route 117
- Route 141
- Route 142
- Route 143 (Matsumoto-Azumino-Ueda)
- Route 144
- Route 147 (Matsumoto-Omachi)
- Route 148 (Omachi-Itoigawa)
- Route 151 (Iida-Shinshiro-Toyohashi)
- Route 152
- Route 153 (Nagoya-Toyota-Iida-Shioriri)
- Route 158 (Fukui-Gujo-Takayama-Matsumoto)
- Route 254
- Route 256 (Gifu-Gujo-Gero-Nakatsugawa-Nagiso-Iida)
- Route 403
- Route 406 (Omachi-Hakuba-Nagano-Susaka-Tsumagoi-Takasaki)
- Route 418 (Ono-Seki-Ena-Iida)

=== Airports ===
The prefecture is home to Matsumoto Airport, its only main airport, though it provides only limited domestic routes. However, other airports in nearby prefectures such as Chubu Centrair International Airport in Aichi, Shizuoka Airport in Shizuoka, Toyama Airport in Toyama, and Haneda Airport and Narita Airport in Tokyo are also used by travellers from the prefecture.

== Education ==
=== Universities ===
==== Public ====
- Nagano College of Nursing (Prefectural)
- Nagano University [Municipal (Ueda City)]
- Shinshu University (National)
- Suwa Tokyo University of Science [Municipal (Chino City)]
- The University of Nagano (Prefectural)

==== Private ====
- Matsumoto University (Private)
- Matsumoto Dental University (Private)
- Saku University (Private)
- Seisen Jogakuin College (Private)

== Economy ==
Nagano Prefecture has a large and diversified economy, with a strong focus on electronics, information technology, precision machinery, agriculture and food products, and tourism, with a total GDP of about ¥8.5 trillion (2017). Several large Japanese companies have production facilities in Nagano Prefecture, such as Citizen Watch, MinebeaMitsumi, Seiko Epson, and Vaio.

== Tourism ==
- Five Mountains of Northern Shinshu
- Kamikōchi
- Lake Kizaki
- Lake Suwa
- Mount Kirigamine
- Suwa-taisha, one of the oldest shrines in Japan
- Matsumoto Castle, one of Japan's national treasures
- One of the world's highest geysers (40–50 metres (130–160 ft)) in Suwa
- Zenkō-ji temple
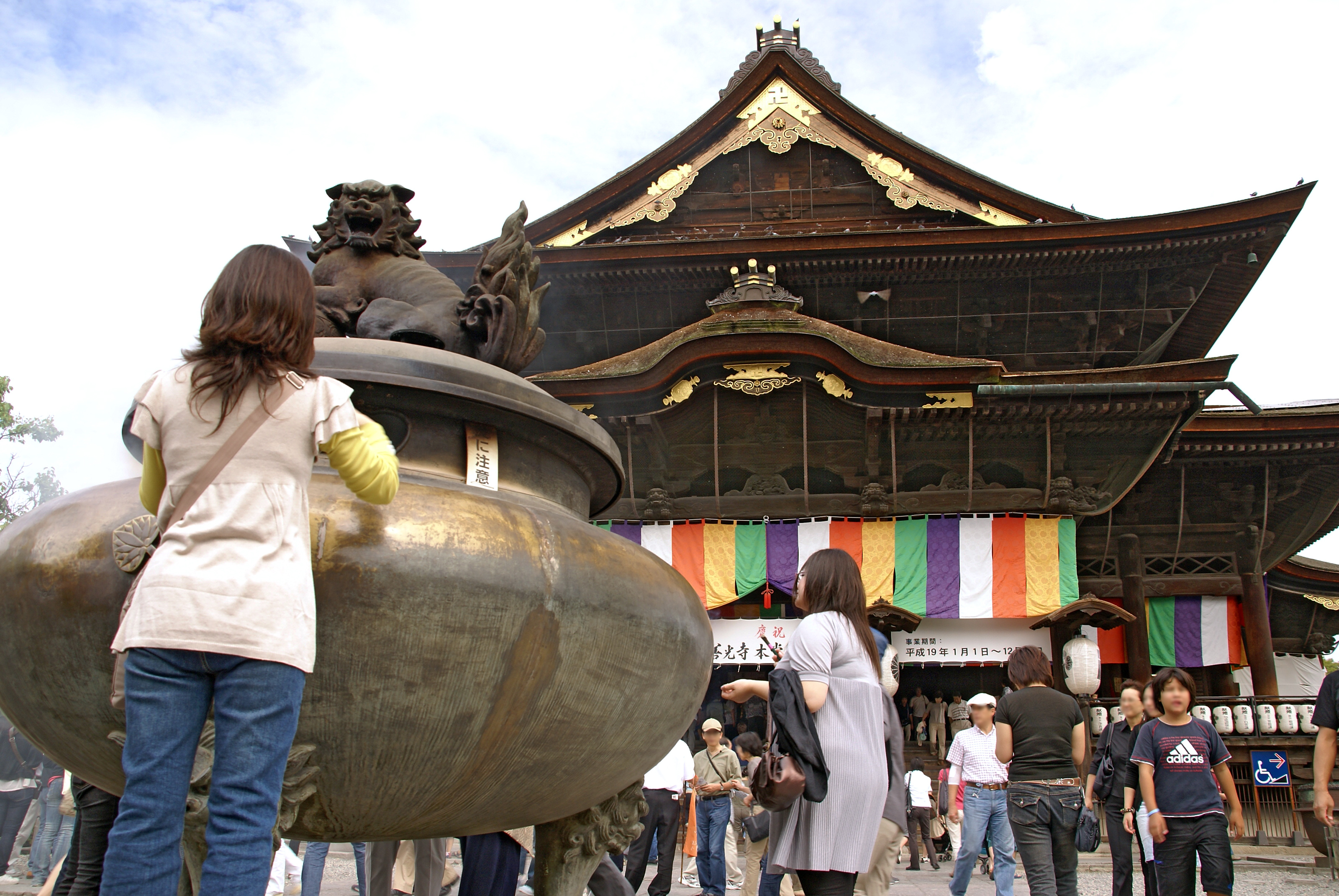
Zenkō-ji

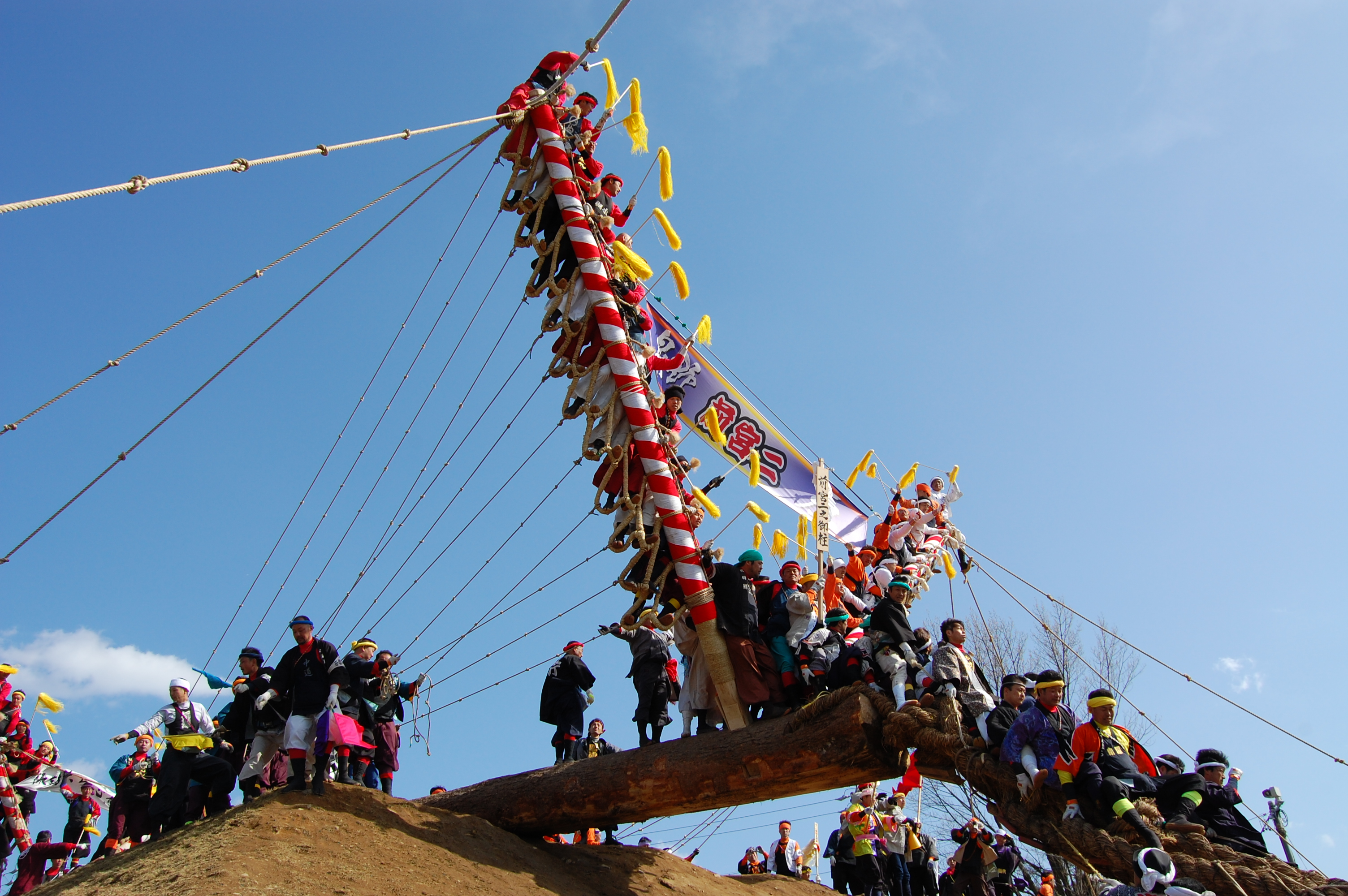
Onbashira Festival, held once every seven years

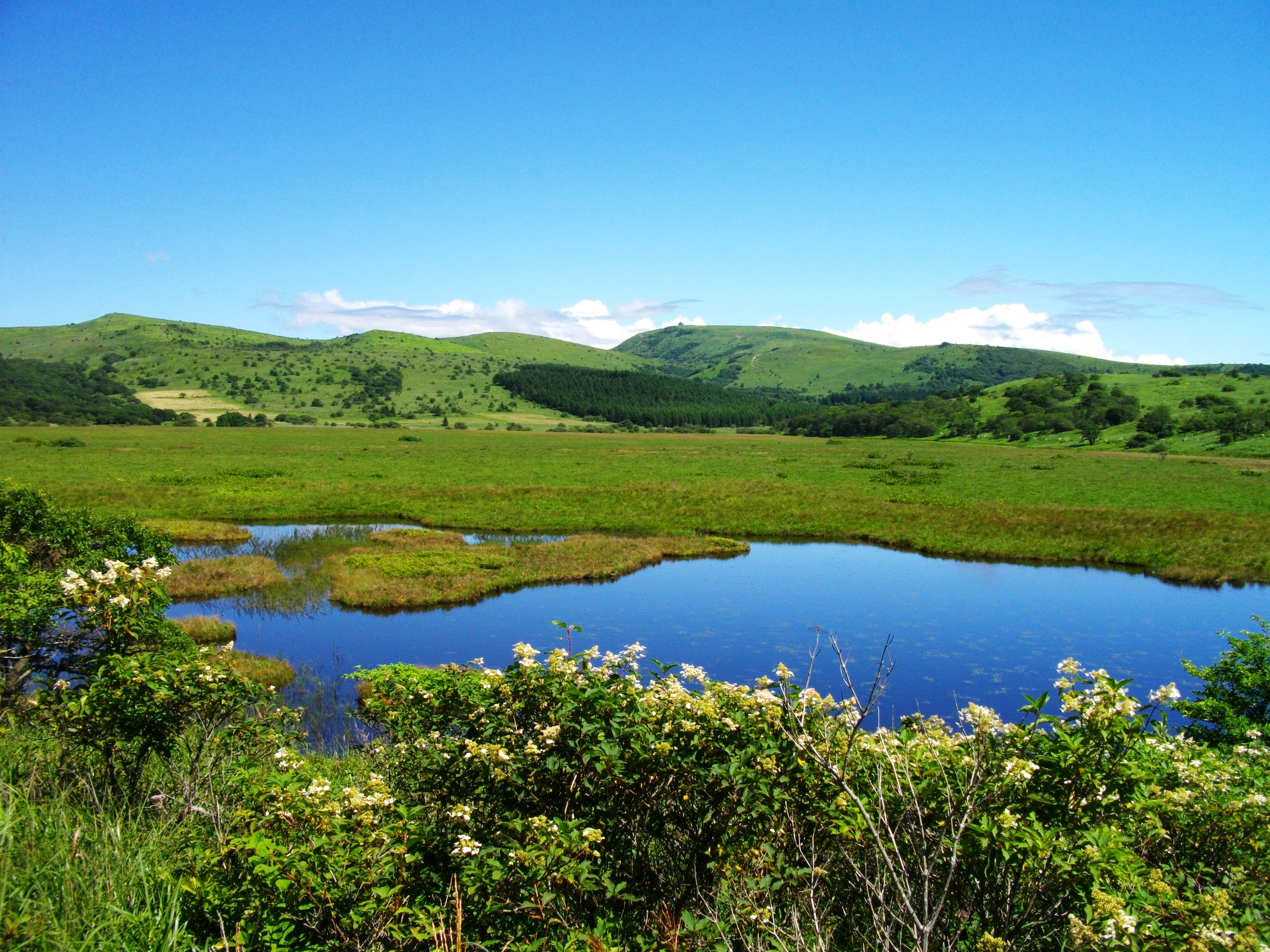
Yashima Wetland in Kirigamine Hill

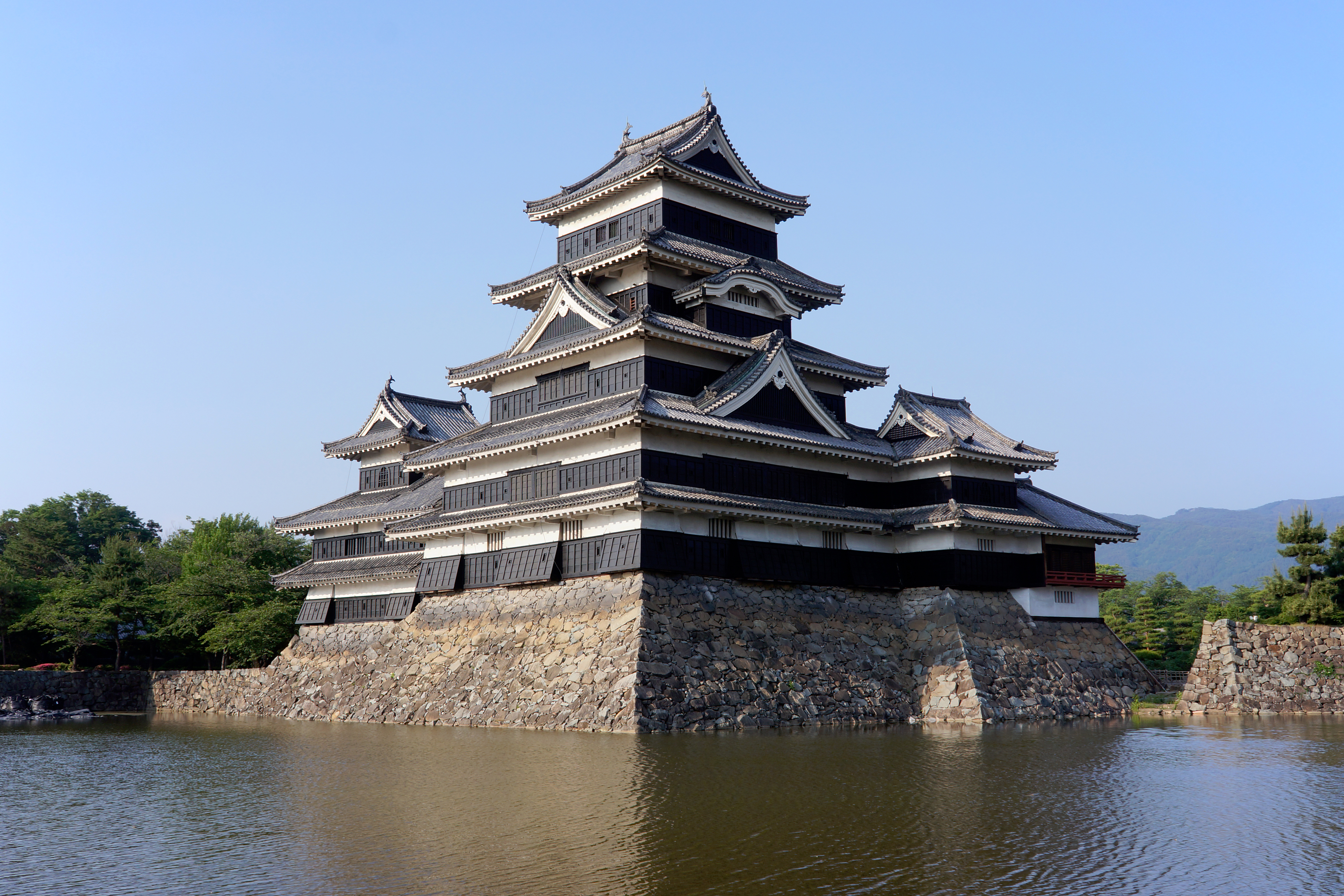
Matsumoto Castle

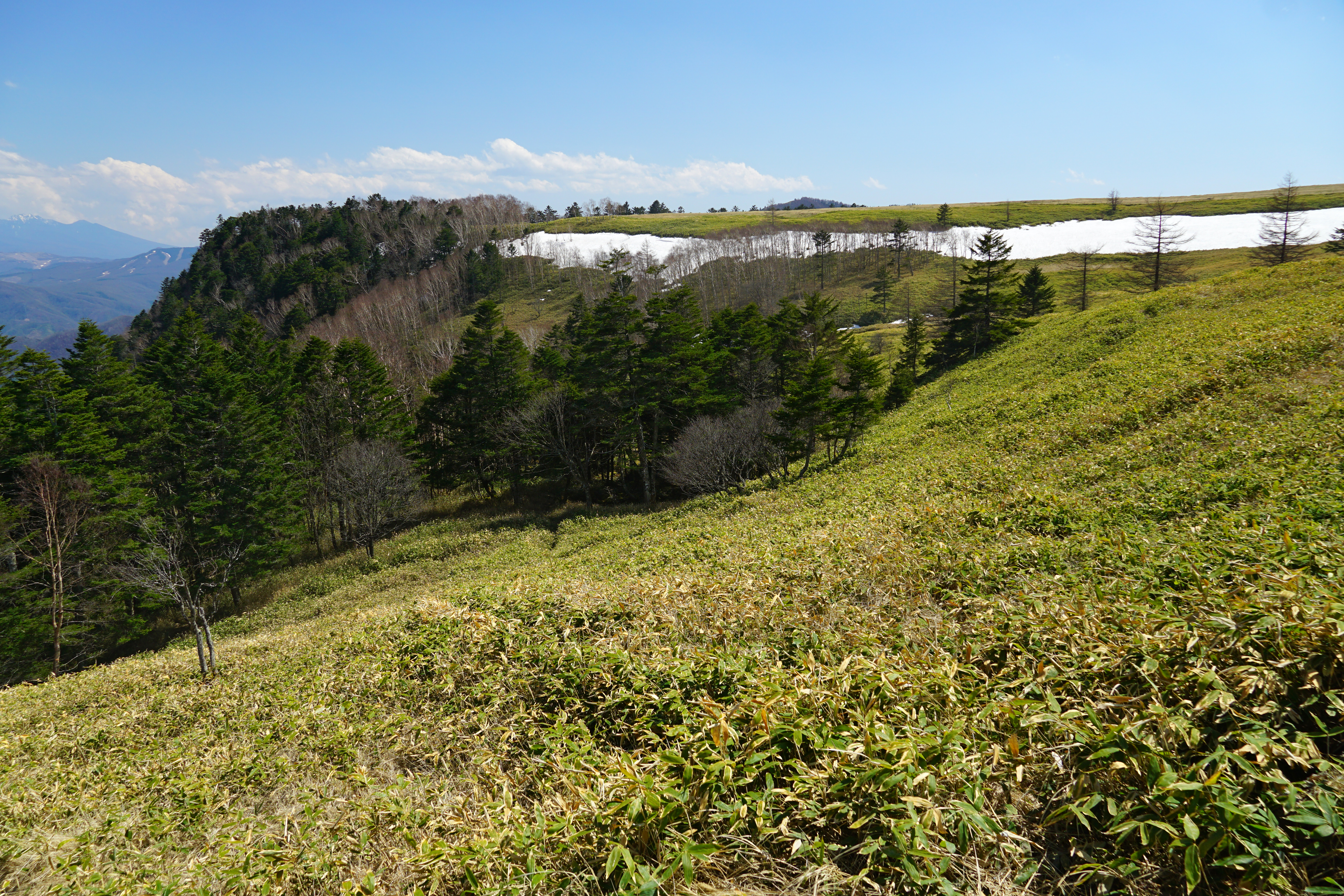
Utsukushigahara Hills

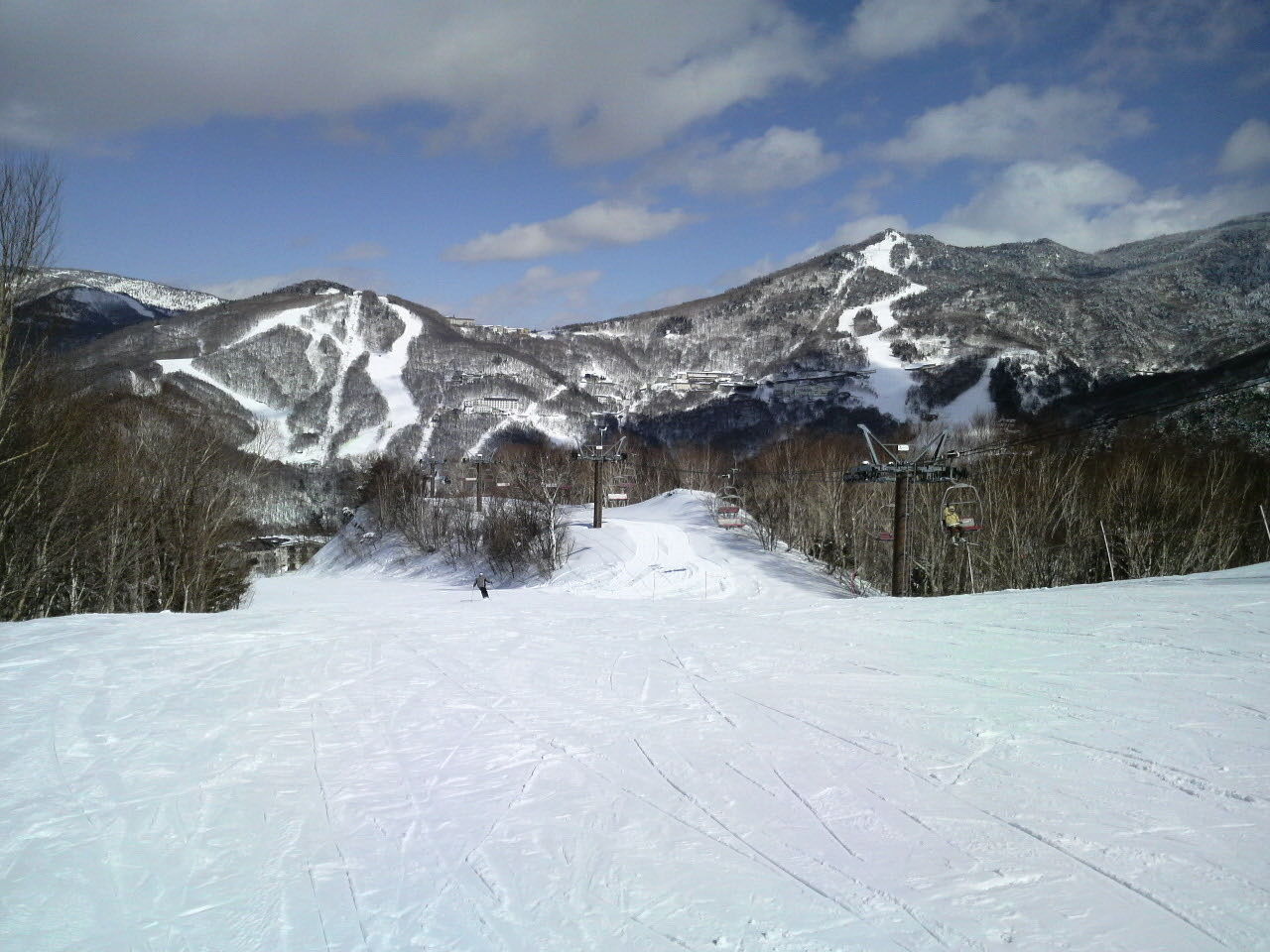
Ski resort in Shiga Hills

== Sports ==
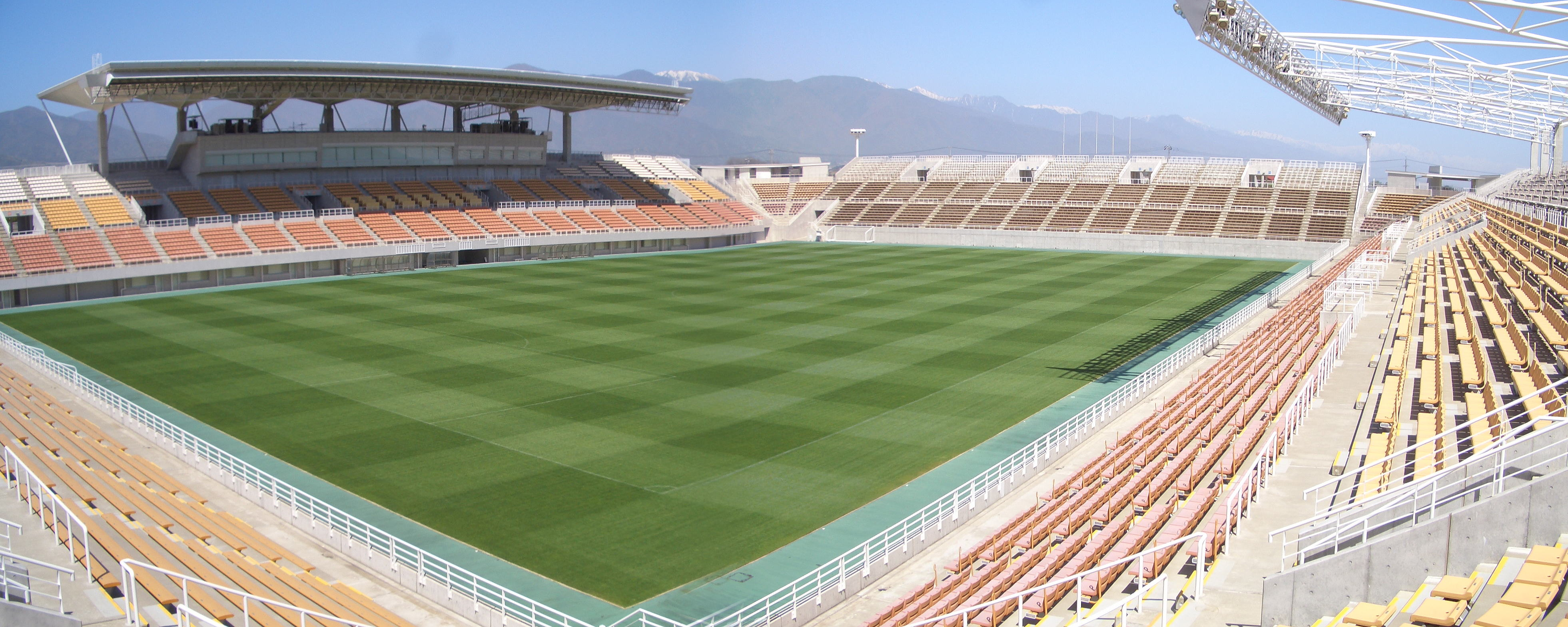
Sunpro Alwin in Matsumoto.

There are two local J.League clubs: AC Nagano Parceiro and Matsumoto Yamaga FC.

== Prefectural symbols ==
- Gentian
- Japanese serow
- Ptarmigan
- Siberian Silver Birch
- Shinano no Kuni (prefecture song)

== Sister regions ==
- Changhua County, Taiwan, since 2008
- Colorado, United States
- Hebei, China

== Notable people ==
- Yuto Adachi, member of South Korean boy band Pentagon
- Glim Spanky, rock band
- Yasuyuki Kazama, drift driver
- Tadamichi Kuribayashi, Imperial Japanese Army general
- Jun'ya "ZUN" Ota, video game developer and creator of the Touhou Project shoot 'em up video game series
- Yasuo Tanaka, independent politician and former governor of Nagano
- Keiichi Tsuchiya, racing driver
- Bumpei Usui, artist
- Takashi Yamazaki, filmmaker
- Tatsumi Yoda, former chairman of Avex

== See also ==
- Chūō Shinkansen
- Matsushiro Underground Imperial Headquarters
