= Takagi, Nagano =

Takagi 喬木村
- Village
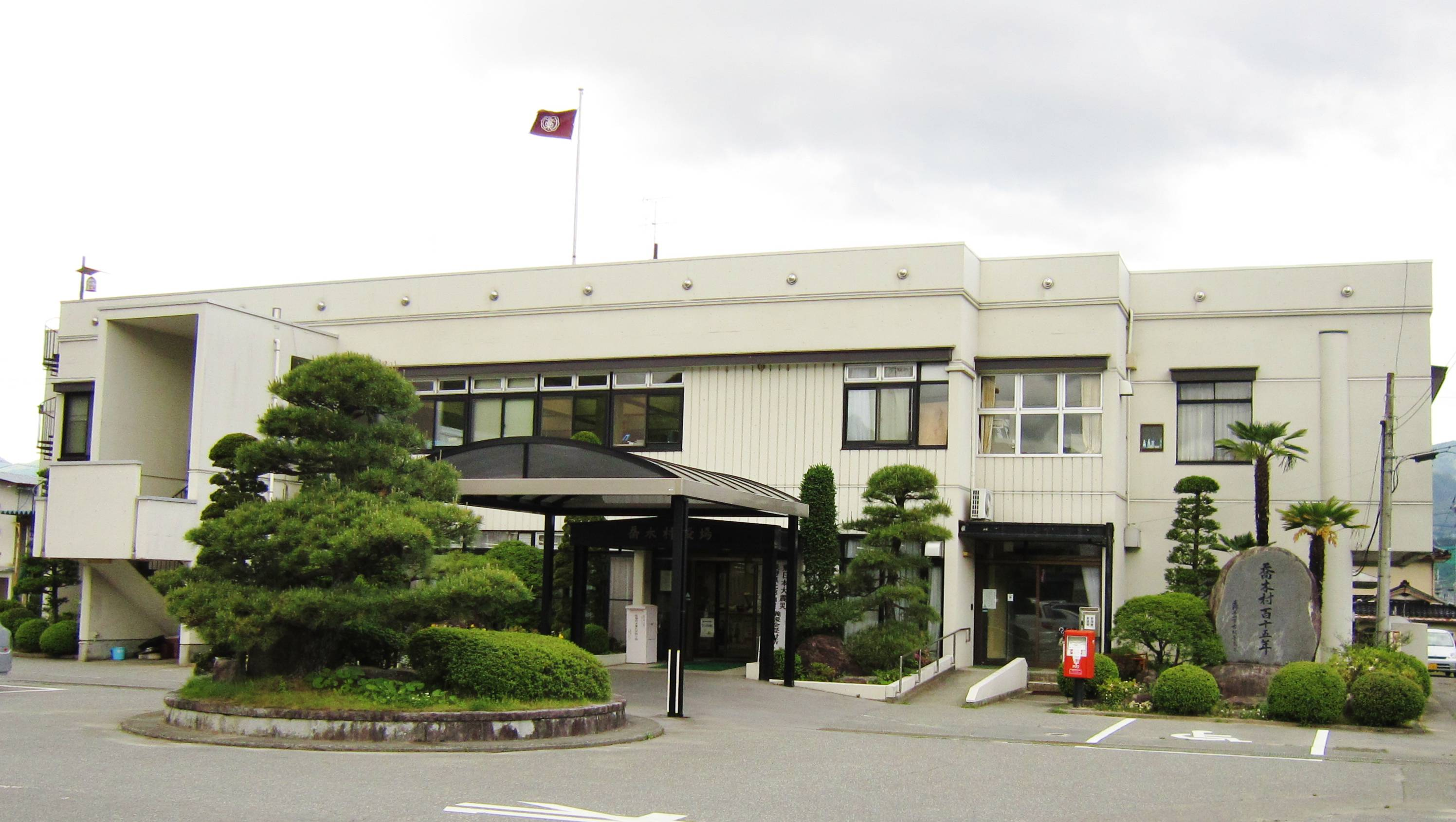
- Takagi Village Hall

- Flag Seal

- Location of Takagi in Nagano Prefecture

- Coordinates: 35°30′49.7″N 137°52′25.9″E
- Country: Japan
- Region: Chūbu (Kōshin'etsu)
- Prefecture: Nagano
- District: Shimoina

Area
  - Total: 66.61 km^{2} (25.72 sq mi)

Population (April 2019)
  - Total: 6,117
  - Density: 91.83/km^{2} (237.8/sq mi)
- Time zone: UTC+9 (Japan Standard Time)
- Symbols
  - Tree: Ginkgo biloba
  - Flower: Primula japonica
  - Bird: Japanese bush warbler
- Phone number: 0265-33-2001
- Address: 6664 Kimura, Takagi-mura, Shimoina-gun, Nagano-ken 395-1107
- Website: Official website

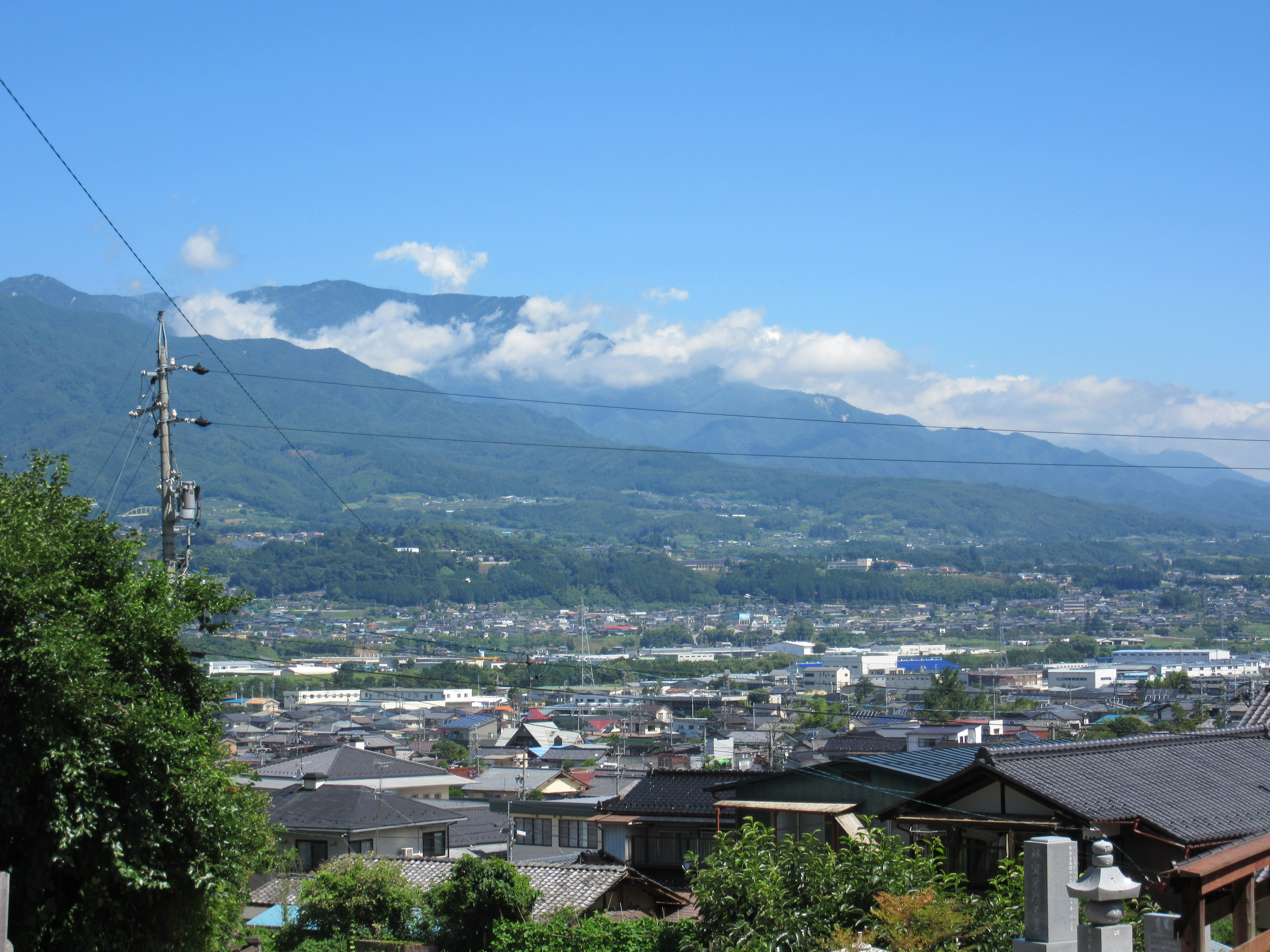
Panorama of Takagi Village

Takagi (喬木村, Takagi-mura) is a village located in Nagano Prefecture, Japan. As of 1 April 2019, the village had an estimated population of 6,117 in 2022 households, and a population density of 92 persons per km^{2}. The total area of the village is 66.61 square kilometres (25.72 sq mi).

== Geography ==
Takagi is located in the Ina Valley mountainous southern of Nagano Prefecture, on a river terrace formed by the Tenryū River, which flows through the village.

=== Surrounding municipalities ===
- Nagano Prefecture
  - Iida
  - Takamori
  - Toyooka

=== Climate ===
The town has a climate characterized by hot and humid summers, and cold winters (Köppen climate classification Cfa). The average annual temperature in Takagi is 11.9 °C. The average annual rainfall is 1717 mm with September as the wettest month. The temperatures are highest on average in August, at around 24.0 °C, and lowest in January, at around -0.0 °C.

== Demographics ==
Per Japanese census data, the population of Takagi has declined slightly in recent decades.

Historical population
Year	Pop.	±%
1940	8,786	—
1950	9,828	+11.9%
1960	8,422	−14.3%
1970	7,385	−12.3%
1980	7,224	−2.2%
1990	7,242	+0.2%
2000	7,089	−2.1%
2010	6,692	−5.6%
2020	5,973	−10.7%

== History ==
The area of present-day Takagi was part of ancient Shinano Province. The village was established on April 1, 1889 with the establishment of the modern municipalities system.

== Economy ==
The economy of Takagi is primarily agricultural, with strawberries and konjac as notable crops. The village was traditionally known for its production of Japanese umbrellas.

== Education ==
Takagi has two public elementary schools and one public middle school operated by the village government. The village does not have a high school.<ref.Takagi village official home page (in Japanese)</ref>

== Transportation ==
=== Railway ===
- The village does not have any passenger railway service.

=== Highway ===
- The village is not located on any national highway.
