= Toyooka, Nagano =

Toyooka 豊丘村
- Village
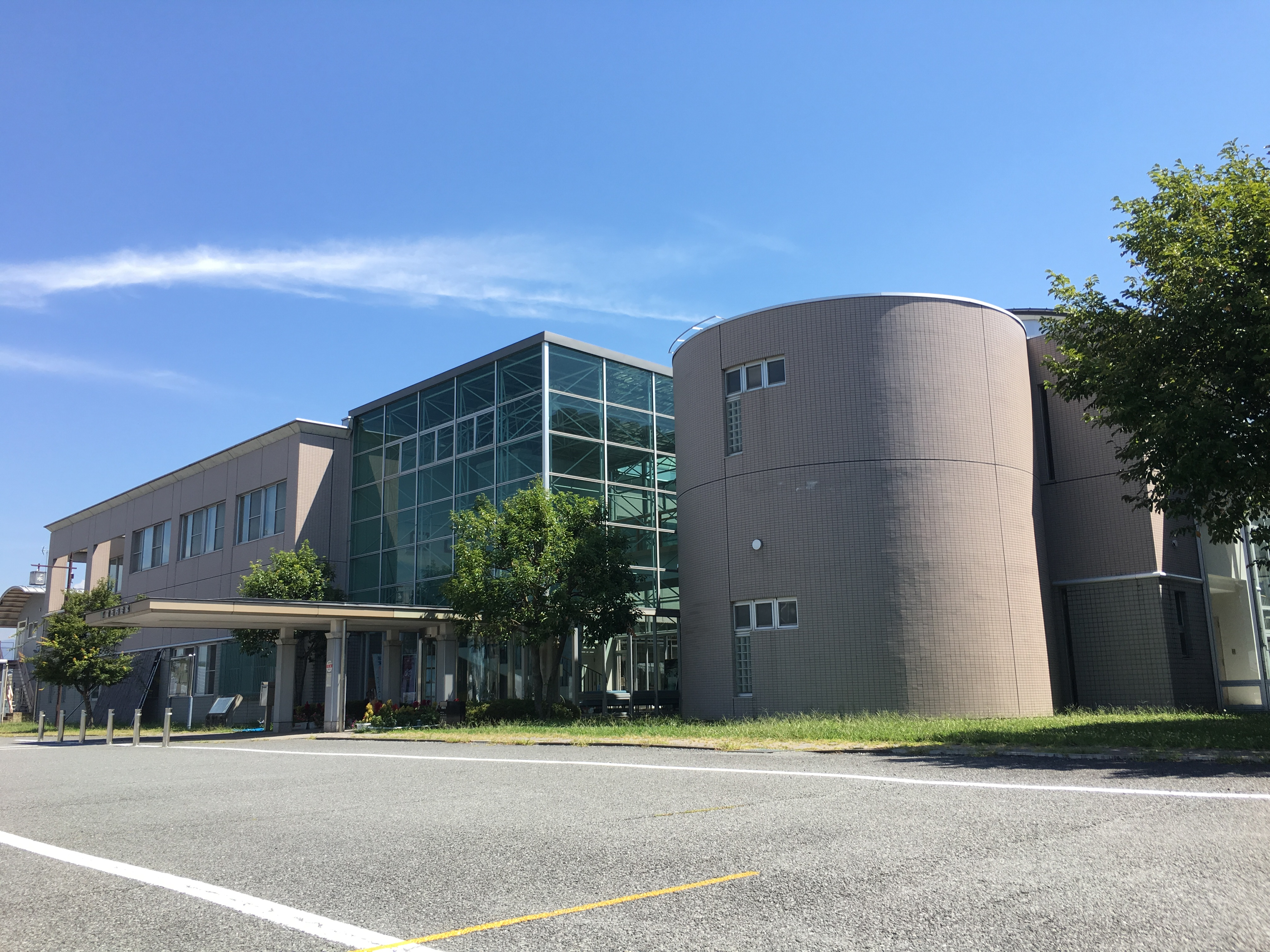
- Toyooka Village Hall

- Flag Seal

- Location of Toyooka in Nagano Prefecture

- Coordinates: 35°33′5.4″N 137°53′45.2″E
- Country: Japan
- Region: Chūbu (Kōshin'etsu)
- Prefecture: Nagano
- District: Shimoina

Area
  - Total: 76.79 km^{2} (29.65 sq mi)

Population (April 2019)
  - Total: 6,704
  - Density: 87.30/km^{2} (226.1/sq mi)
- Time zone: UTC+9 (Japan Standard Time)
- Symbols
  - Tree: Pinus densiflora
  - Flower: Magnolia kobus
- Phone number: 0265-35-3311
- Address: 3120 Kumashiro, Toyooka-mura, Shimoina-gun, Nagano-ken 399-3202
- Website: Official website

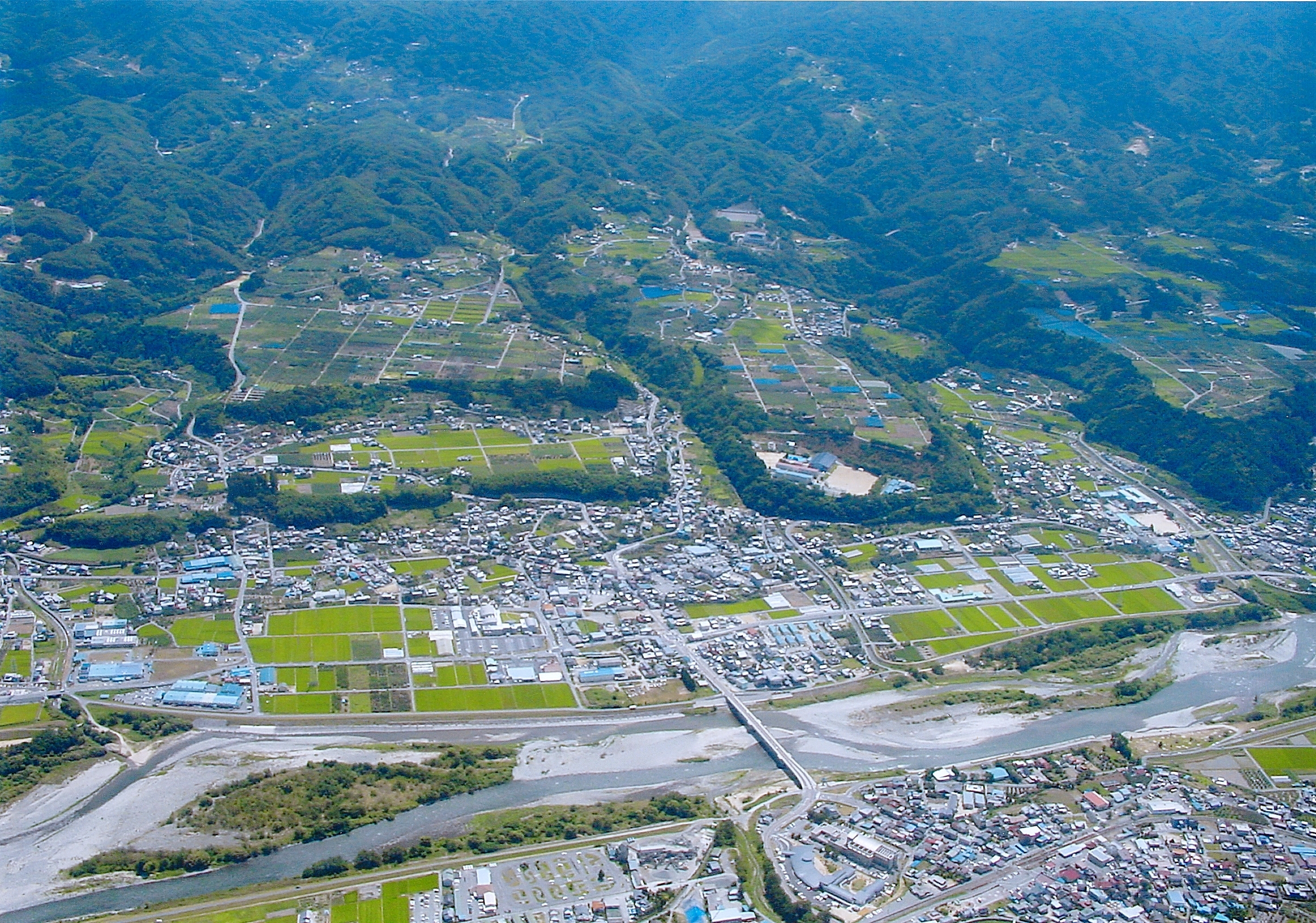
Panorama of Toyooka Village

Toyooka (豊丘村, Toyooka-mura) is a village located in Nagano Prefecture, Japan. As of 1 April 2019, the village had an estimated population of 6,704 in 2156 households, and a population density of 87 persons per km^{2}. The total area of the village is 85.2 square kilometres (32.9 sq mi).

== Geography ==
Toyooka is located in the Ina Valley in mountainous southern of Nagano Prefecture. The Tenryū River runs through the village.

=== Surrounding municipalities ===
- Nagano Prefecture
  - IIda
  - Matsukawa
  - Ōshika
  - Takagi
  - Takamori

=== Climate ===
The town has a climate characterized by hot and humid summers, and cold winters (Köppen climate classification Cfa). The average annual temperature in Toyooka is 10.4 °C. The average annual rainfall is 1746 mm with September as the wettest month. The temperatures are highest on average in August, at around 22.7 °C, and lowest in January, at around -1.6 °C.

== Demographics ==
Per Japanese census data, the population of Toyooka has decreased gradually over the past 70 years.

Historical population
Year	Pop.	±%
1940	8,822	—
1950	10,077	+14.2%
1960	8,716	−13.5%
1970	7,600	−12.8%
1980	7,409	−2.5%
1990	7,254	−2.1%
2000	7,221	−0.5%
2010	6,819	−5.6%
2020	6,426	−5.8%

== History ==
The area of present-day Toyooka was part of ancient Shinano Province. Ruins from the Japanese Paleolithic, Jomon and Kofun periods indicate continuous settlement for thousands of years. The villages of Kumashiro and Kouno were established on April 1, 1889 with the establishment of the modern municipalities system. The two villages merged on April 1, 1955 to form the village of Toyooka.

== Economy ==
Toyooka is noted for its harvest of matsutake mushrooms.

== Education ==
Toyooka has two public elementary schools and one public middle school operated by the village government. The village does not have a high school.

== Transportation ==
=== Railway ===
- The village does not have any passenger railway service.

=== Highway ===
- The village is not located on any national highway.
