= Enasan Tunnel =

Road tunnel in Japan

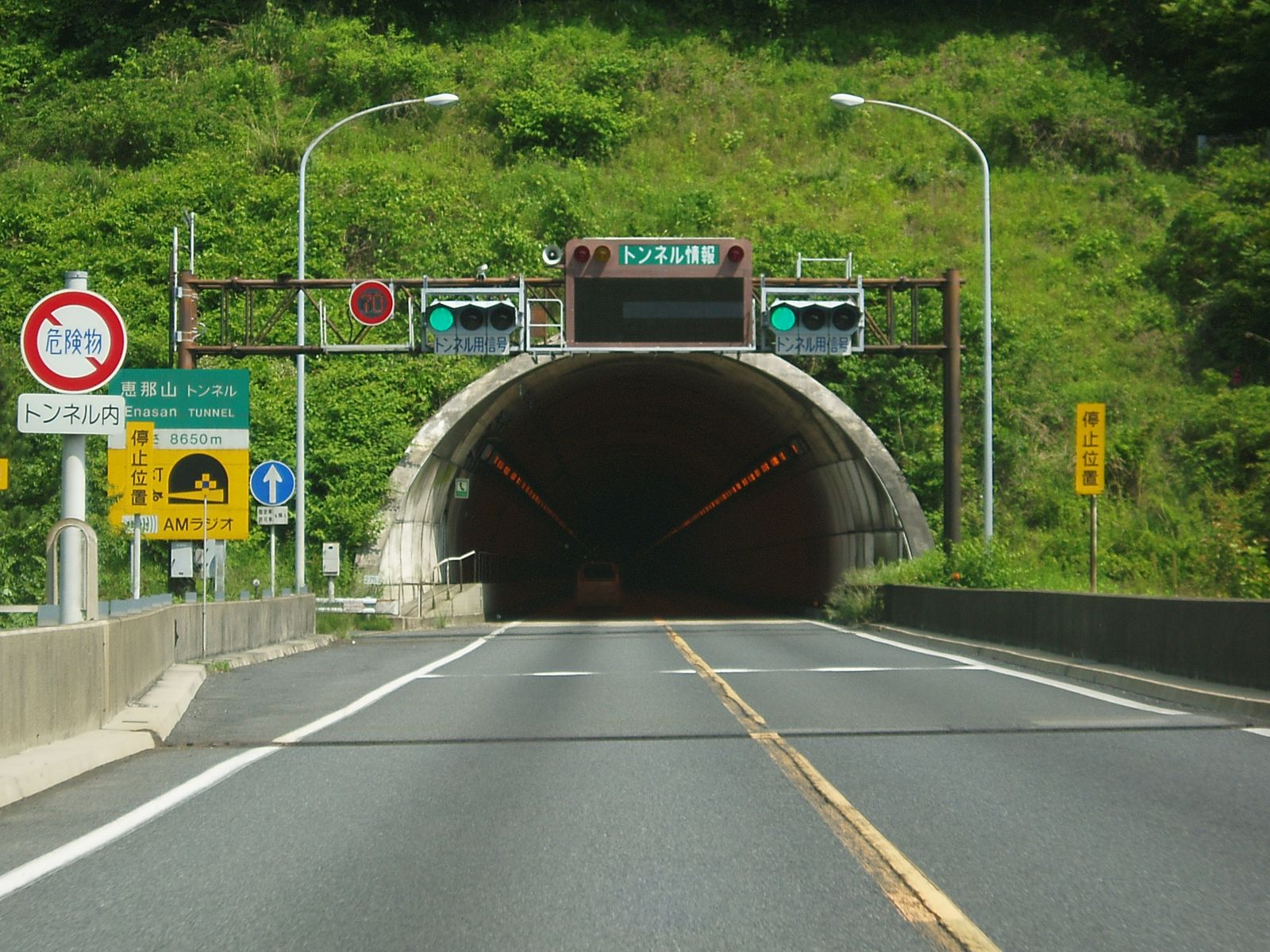
- Enasan Tunnel between Nagano prefecture and Gifu prefecture
- Interactive map of Enasan Tunnel

Overview
- Line: Chūō Expressway
- Location: between Nagano Prefecture and Gifu Prefecture
- Coordinates: 35°28′59″N 137°37′43″E
- Status: active
- Start: Achi, Nagano
- End: Nakatsugawa

Operation
- Traffic: Cars
- Character: Passenger and Freight

Technical
- Line length: 8.649 km (5.374 mi)
- No. of tracks: 2
- Operating speed: 80km/h

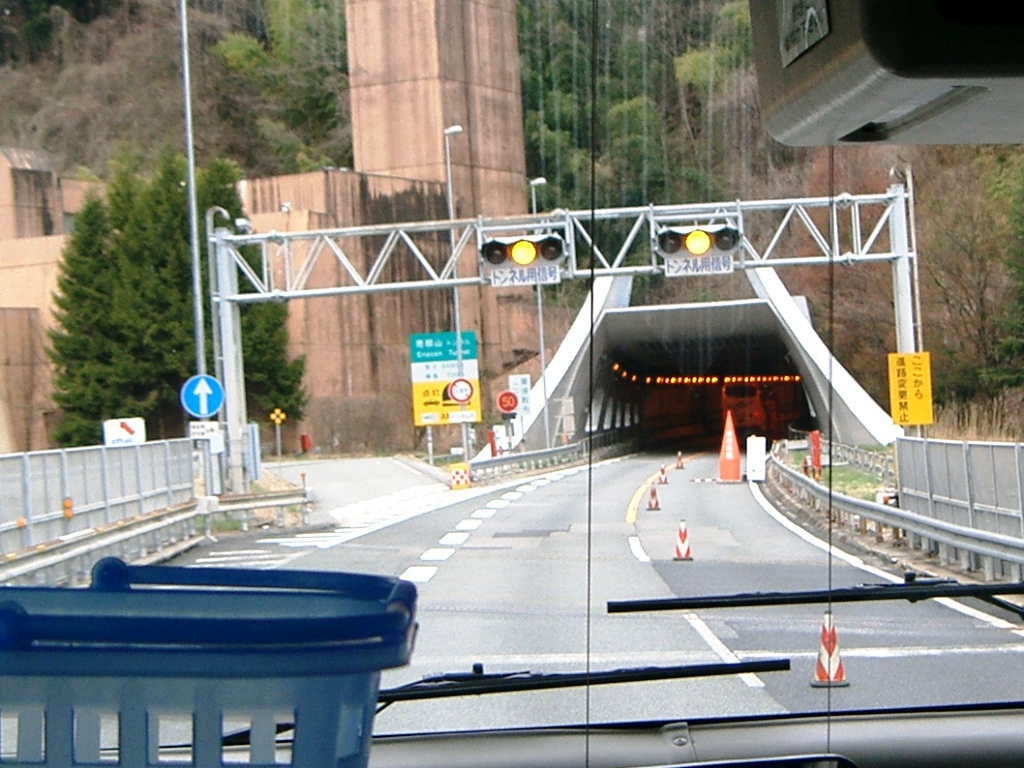
Tunnel entrance from Gifu side.

Enasan Tunnel (恵那山トンネル; えなさんトンネル) is a tunnel on the Chūō Expressway (E19) in Japan that runs (through the Kiso Mountains) from Shimoina District, Nagano prefecture to Nakatsugawa City, Gifu prefecture with up-line length of 8.649 km and down-line length of 8.489 km. It was completed and opened in 1985.

== See also ==
- List of tunnels in Japan
- Seikan Tunnel Tappi Shakō Line
- Sakhalin–Hokkaido Tunnel
- Bohai Strait tunnel
