= Kadoshima Station =

Railway station in Yasuoka, Nagano Prefecture, Japan

Kadoshima Station 門島駅
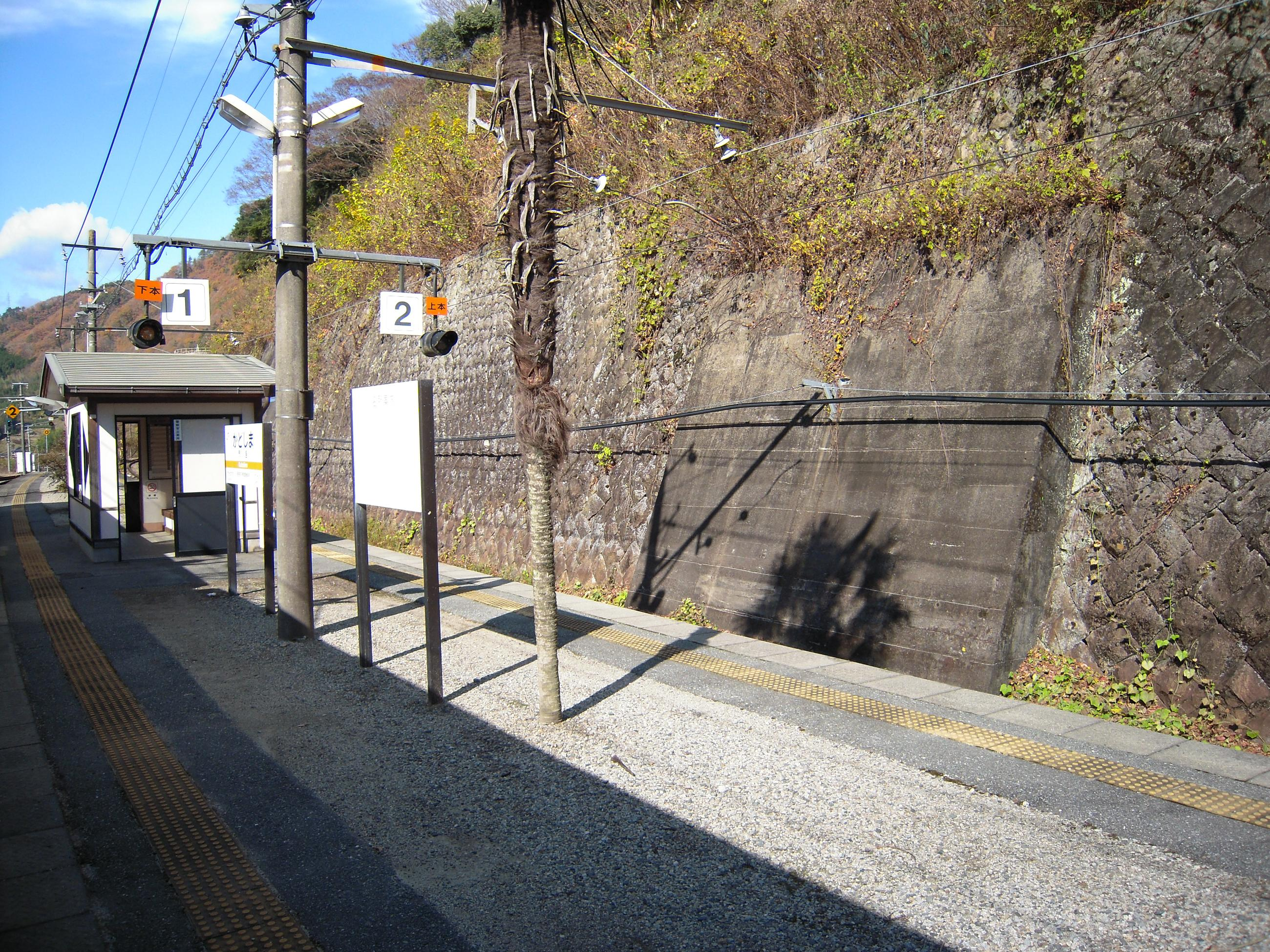
- Kadoshima Station in September 2009

General information
- Location: Kadoshima, Yasuoka-mura, Shimoina-gun, Nagano-ken 399-1801; Japan
- Coordinates: 35.3752°N 137.8140°E
- Elevation: 350 m (1,150 ft)
- Operator: JR Central
- Line: Iida Line
- Distance: 107.9 km from Toyohashi
- Platforms: 1 island platform

Other information
- Status: Unstaffed

History
- Opened: 30 October 1932

Passengers
- FY2016: 4 (daily)
Location
- Location within Nagano Prefecture Location within Japan

Kadoshima Station (門島駅, Kadoshima-eki) is a railway station on the Iida Line in the village of Yasuoka, Shimoina, Nagano Prefecture, Japan, operated by Central Japan Railway Company (JR Central).

== Lines ==
Kadoshima Station is served by the Iida Line and is 107.9 kilometers from the starting point of the line at Toyohashi Station.

== Station layout ==
The station consists of a single ground-level island platform. The station is unattended, and there is no station building, but only a waiting room on the platform.

=== Platforms ===
1	■ Iida Line	for Iida and Tenryūkyō
2	■ Iida Line	for Chūbu-Tenryū and Toyohashi

== Adjacent stations ==
«	Service	»
Iida Line
Limited Express "Inaji" (特急「伊那路」): Does not stop at this station
Tamoto	Local (普通)	Karakasa

== History ==
Kadoshima Station opened on 30 October 1932. With the privatization of Japanese National Railways (JNR) on 1 April 1987, the station came under the control of JR Central.

== Passenger statistics ==
In fiscal 2016, the station was used by an average of 4 passengers daily (boarding passengers only).

== Surrounding area ==
- Tenryū River
- Yasuoka Dam
- Yasuoka Village Hall

== See also ==
- List of railway stations in Japan
