= Motoichi Kumagai =

Japanese photographer and illustrator

- 熊谷元一
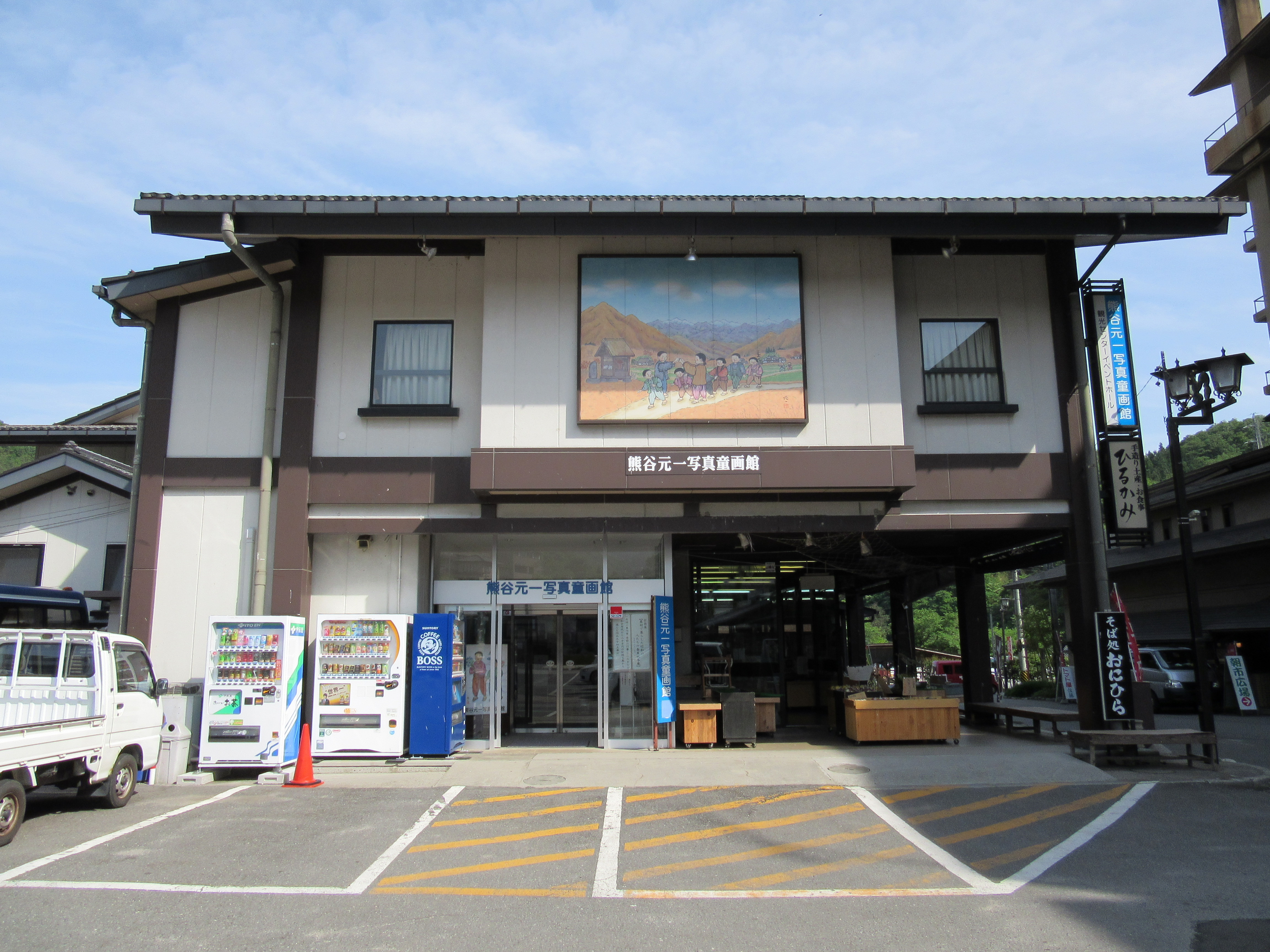
- Gumagai motoichi museum.
- Born: 12 July 1909; Ōchi, Shimoina District, Nagano Prefecture, Japan
- Died: 6 November 2010 (aged 101); Tokyo, Japan
- Occupations: Photographer, Illustrator
- Writing career
- Language: Japanese

Motoichi Kumagai (熊谷 元一, Kumagai Motoichi; 12 July 1909 – 6 November 2010) was a Japanese photographer and illustrator of books for children, known for his portrayal of rural and school life. He has illustrated numerous children's books, books containing his photography, and other works. His works have won prizes, beginning with a photography prize from the Mainichi Shimbun in 1955.

He is sometimes credited as Motokazu Kumagai or Motoiti Kumagai.

== Biography ==
Kumagai was born on 12 July 1909 in the village of Ōchi (会地村, Ōchi-mura) (now part of Achi), Shimoina District, Nagano Prefecture, Japan. His given name 元一 is generally romanized as "Motoichi", but is also sometimes written as "Motoiti" or "Motokazu". (Note: "Motoichi" is the romanization according to the Biographic Dictionary of Japanese Photography (2005). The website maintained by his hometown uses "Motoiti", an alternate romanization). According to 328 Outstanding Japanese Photographers, the reading is "Motokazu".)

From 1930 to 1933, Kumagai worked as a teacher. He had his first work for children published in the May 1932 issue of the magazine Kodomo no Kuni. In 1936, he bought a Pearlette camera (a Konishiroku derivative of the Vest Pocket Kodak), with a simple meniscus lens, and started to use this to photograph village life. His first photograph collection was published two years later by Asahi Shinbunsha.

He went to Tokyo in 1939 as a government photographer and was later sent three times to Manchukuo. After the war, he returned to teach in his village. A book of photographs featuring school life published by Iwanami Shoten in 1955 won a photography prize from Mainichi Shimbun.

Kumagai published books of works for children as well as books of photographs. His photographs are held in the permanent collection of the Tokyo Metropolitan Museum of Photography, and a volume of the series Nihon no Shashinka is dedicated to his work. He has received various honours for his work since 1990. The village of Achi created a gallery called Kumagai Motoichi Shashin Dōgakan to permanently exhibit his work.

He died of natural causes on 6 November 2010 in a nursing home in Tokyo.

== Bibliography ==
=== As illustrator ===
- Gakkō Ehon: Shūshin no Maki (学校ヱホン 修身ノ巻) (Suzuki Jin Seidō, 1936)
- Itachi to Kodomo (いたちと子供) (Kin no Seisha, 1941)
- Ujigami-sama (氏神さま) Kodansha, 1942)
- Yama no Mura (ヤマノムラ) (Kyōyōsha, 1942)
- Ano Mura Kono Mura (あの村この村) (Hakubunkan, 1943)
- Yamaguni no Fudoki (山国の風土記) (Sanseidō, 1943)
- Yoi Ko no Mura (ヨイコノムラ) (Nōsangyoson Bunka Kyōkai, 1943)
- Furusato no Ehon: Fuyu no Maki (ふるさとの絵本 冬の巻) (Miyajima Shoten, 1946)
- Furusato no Ehon: Natsu no Maki (ふるさとの絵本 夏の巻) (Miyajima Shoten, 1947)
- Furusato Monogatari (ふるさと物語) (Kodansha, 1949)
- Shizen no Naka de (自然の中で) (Popura-sha, 1969)
- Yama no Fūkko (山の風っ子) (Bunkendō Shichiseisha, 1969)
- Genjii to Fushigi na Mura (源じいとふしぎな村) (Akane Shobō, 1975)
- Mune ni Tomoru Tō (胸にともる灯) (Chikuma Shobō, 1975)
- Furusato to Nōgyō o Minaosu Nōkyō Ehon Shirīzu (ふるさとと農業を見直す農協絵本シリーズ) (Iida Chūō Nōgyō Kyōdō Kumiai)
  - Ishi no Kataribe: Mura no Rekishi o Kangaeru Hon (石の語り部 むらの歴史を考える本) (1981)
  - Mura no Ishibumi: Nōkyō no Rekishi o Kangaeru Hon (むらの碑 農協の歴史を考える本) (1982)
  - Irori: Nōka no Kurashi o Hangaeru Hon (いろり 農家のくらしを考える本) (1983)
  - Moraiburo: Nōka no Kurashi o Kangaeru Hon (もらい風呂 農家のくらしを考える本) (1984)
  - Kobashi Yasumi: Mura no Shikitari o Kangaeru Hon Sono 1 (こばし休み むらの仕来たりを考える本その1) (1985)
- Kowashimizu (こわしみず) (Kiyose-shi Kyōdo Hakubutsukan, 1985)
- Furusato o Minaosu Ehon (ふるさとを見直す絵本) (Nōsangyoson Bunka Kyōkai, 1986)
  1. Yatauchi: Mukashi no "Mugizukuri" (夜田打―むかしの「麦作り」) (ISBN 4540860518)
  2. Osanaburi: Mukashi no "Gomezukuri" (おさなぶり―むかしの「米作り」) (ISBN 4540860526)
  3. Okaiko-sama: Mukashi no "Kogai" (おかいこさま―むかしの「蚕飼い」) (ISBN 4540860534)
  4. Mushi Fūji: Minna no Kenkō (虫封じ―みんなの健康) ISBN 4-540-86054-2)
  5. Ishi no Kataribe: Mura no Rekishi (石の語り部―むらの歴史) (ISBN 4-540-86055-0)
  6. Mura no Ishibumi: Kyōdō Kumiai no Rekishi (むらの碑 協同組合の歴史) (ISBN 4-540-86056-9)
  7. Irori: Nōka no Kurashi 1 (いろり―農家のくらし1) (ISBN 4-540-86057-7)
  8. Morai-buro: Nōka no Kurashi 2 (もらい風呂 農家のくらし2) (ISBN 4-540-86058-5)
  9. Kobashi Yasumi: Mura no Shikitari 1 (こばし休み―むらの仕来たり1) (ISBN 4-540-86059-3)
  10. Mura Matsuri: Mura no Shikitari 2 (むら祭り むらの仕来たり2) (ISBN 4-540-86060-7)
- Inadani no Sanson Seikatsushi (伊那谷の山村生活史) (Kyōdo Shuppansha, 1988, ISBN 4-87663-107-7)
- Kumagai Motoichi no Sekai: Gashū (熊谷元一の世界 画集) (Kyōdo Shuppansha, 1992, ISBN 4-87663-180-8)
- Shōnen no Inadani (少年の伊那谷) (Shinano Mainichi Shinbunsha, 1992, ISBN 4-7840-9206-4)
- Reibāchan no Inadani no Mukashibanashi (姈ばぁちゃんの伊那谷の昔ばなし) (Minami Shinshū Shinbunsha, 1993, ISBN 4-943981-04-6)

=== As illustrator and writer ===
- Warabe-uta (わらべうた) (Rironsha, 1966)
- Nihon no Kaki no Ki (二ほんのかきのき) (Fukuinkan, 1969)
  - Reprinted until at least as recently as 1994; later printings are ISBN 4-8340-0204-7)
- Kaiko (かいこ) (Fukuinkan, 1976)
  - Reprint: (Fukuinkan Shoten, 1985. ISBN 4-8340-0473-2)
- Shinshū Imadani no Okashi (信州伊那谷のお菓子) (Shinanoji, 1980)
- Shinano Warabe Uta (信濃わらべうた) (Arisukan, 1983)
- Tanabata Matsuri (たなばたまつり) (Fukuinkan Shoten, 1985)
- Omoide no Komaba (思い出の駒場) (Kyōdo Shuppansha, 1994. ISBN 4-87663-266-9)
- Jiicha no Kodomo no Koro (じいちゃの子どものころ) (Fuzanbō Intānashonaru, 2005. ISBN 4-902385-12-0)
- Kodomo Sekai no Genfūkei (子ども世界の原風景) (Shin'yōsha, 2007. ISBN 978-4-88242-191-7)

=== As photographer ===
- Ōchi-mura: Ichi Nōson no Shashin Kiroku (会地村 一農村の写真記録) (Asahi Shinbunsha, 1938)
  - Reprint (Kumagai Motoichi Shashin-hozon-kai, 1985)
- Kaiko no Mura (かいこの村) (Iwanami Shoten, 1953)
  - Reprint (Iwanami Shoten, 1988, ISBN 4-00-003528-2)
- Minami Shinano no Nōson no Fujin (南信濃の農村の婦人) (Iwanami Shoten, 1954)
  - Reprint (Iwanami Shoten, 1988, ISBN 4-00-003526-6)
- Ichinensei: Aru Shōgaku Kyōshi no Kiroku (一年生 ある小学教師の記録) (Iwanami Shoten, 1955)
  - Reprint (Iwanami Shoten, 2007, ISBN 978-4-00-028209-3)
- Aru Sanson no Shōwa Shi: Shinshū Achi-mura 39-nen: Shashin Kirokushū (ある山村の昭和史 信州阿智村39年 写真記録集}) (Shinano-ji, 1975)
- Furusato no Shōwa-shi: Kurashi no Hen'yō: Gurafikku Repōto (ふるさとの昭和史 暮らしの変容 グラフィック・レポート) (Iwanami Shoten, 1989. ISBN 4-00-009832-2, as photographer and writer)
- Kumagai Motoichi Sakuhinshū: Ichinensei to Sono Ato (熊谷元一作品展 一年生とその後) (JCII, 1992, no ISBN)
- Mura no Ichinen (村の一年) (Kōbundō, 1993. ISBN 4-335-50019-X)
- Kumagai Motoichi Shashin Zenshū (熊谷元一写真全集) (Kyōdo Shuppansha, 1994)
  1. Senzenhen (戦前編) (ISBN 4-87663-248-0)
  2. Sengohen 1 (戦後編 1) (ISBN 4-87663-249-9)
  3. Sengohen 2 (戦後編 2) (ISBN 4-87663-250-2)
  4. Inadani no matsuri (伊那谷の祭り) (ISBN 4-87663-251-0)
- Kumagai Motoichi (熊谷元一) (Iwanami Shoten, 1997, ISBN 4-00-008357-0)
- Kiyose no 365 Nichi (清瀬の365日) (Kiyose-shi, 1999)
- Shinshū Shōwa no Genfūkei: Kumagai Motoichi Hakuju Kinen Shashinshū (信州・昭和の原風景 熊谷元一白寿記念写真集) (Issōsha Shuppan, 2008. ISBN 978-4-902842-41-8)

=== Other ===
- Mura no Fujin Seikatsu (村の婦人生活) (Shinhyōronsha, 1954)
  - 2nd edition (Shinhyōronsha, 1956)
- Nōka no Shiki (農家の四季) (Ie-no-Hikari Kyōkai, 1961)
- Inadani o Egaku (伊那谷を描く) (Shūbunsha)
  1. Inadani o Egaku (伊那谷を描く) (1967)
  2. Inadani no Warabe Uta (伊那谷のわらべうた) (1968)
  3. Kuroda Ningyō (黒田人形) (1969)
  4. Inadani no Kaiko (伊那谷のかいこ) (1969)
  5. Tenryūgawa no Kawaranbe (天竜川のカワランベ) (1972)
- Mura no Shashin Sensei (むらの写真先生) (Ie-no-Hikari Kyōkai, 1968)
- Nazuna Hanasaku (なずな花咲く) (Minami Shinshū Shinbunsha Shuppankyoku, 1996)
- Natsukashi no Shōgaku Ichinensei (なつかしの小学一年生) (Kawade Shobō Shinsha, 2001, ISBN 4-309-72708-5, as writer)
- 50-sai ni Natta Ichinensei (五十歳になった一年生) (Kumagai Motoichi to Ichinensei no Kai, 2001, no ISBN)
- Sansoku no Waraji (三足のわらじ) (Minami Shinshū Shinbunsha Shuppankyoku, 2003, no ISBN)
- Utsushitsuzukete 69-nen: Ōchi-mura–Achi-mura: Shōwa, Heisei (写しつづけて69年: 會地村-阿智村 昭和・平成) (Kumagai Motoichi Shashin Dōgakan, 2003, no ISBN)
- Ichinensei no Tki Sensō ga Hajimatta: Warera Kokumin Gakkō Funsenki (一年生のとき戦争が始まった われら国民学校奮戦記) (Nōsangyoson Bunka Kyōkai, 2005. ISBN 4-540-04358-7, as illustrator and photographer)
- Shashinka Kumagai Motoichi to Media no Jidai: Shōwa no Kiroku/Kioku (写真家・熊谷元一とメディアの時代 昭和の記録/記憶) (Seikyūsha, 2005. ISBN 4-7872-7205-5)

== Awards and recognition ==
- Mainichi Shimbun photography prize (1955)
