= Tamoto Station =

Railway station in Yasuoka, Nagano Prefecture, Japan

Tamoto Station 田本駅
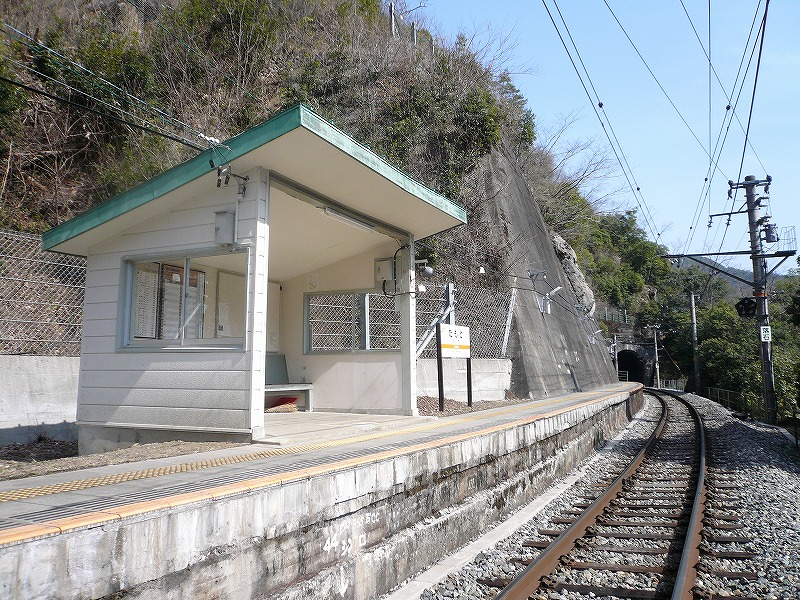
- Tamoto Station in September 2009

General information
- Location: Nakata, Yasuoka-mura, Shimoina-gun, Nagano-ken 399-1801; Japan
- Coordinates: 35.3485°N 137.8381°E
- Elevation: 346 m (1,135 ft)
- Operator: JR Central
- Line: Iida Line
- Distance: 104.2 km from Toyohashi
- Platforms: 1 side platform

Other information
- Status: Unstaffed

History
- Opened: 15 November 1935

Passengers
- FY2016: 2 (daily)
Location
- Location within Nagano Prefecture Location within Japan

Tamoto Station (田本駅, Tamoto-eki) is a railway station on the Iida Line in the village of Yasuoka, Shimoina, Nagano Prefecture, Japan, operated by Central Japan Railway Company (JR Central).

== Lines ==
Tamoto Station is served by the Iida Line and is 104.2 kilometers from the starting point of the line at Toyohashi Station.

== Station layout ==
The station consists of a single ground-level side platform serving one bi-directional track. The station is unattended. There is no station building, but only a shelter on the platform.

== Adjacent stations ==
«	Service	»
Iida Line
Limited Express Inaji: Does not stop at this station
Nukuta	Local	Kadoshima

== History ==
Tamoro Station opened on 15 November 1935. With the privatization of Japanese National Railways (JNR) on 1 April 1987, the station came under the control of JR Central.

== Passenger statistics ==
In fiscal 2016, the station was used by an average of 2 passengers daily (boarding passengers only).

== Surrounding area ==
- Tenryū River

== See also ==
- List of railway stations in Japan
