= Ina-Kozawa Station =

Railway station in Tenryū, Nagano Prefecture, Japan

Ina-Kozawa Station 伊那小沢駅
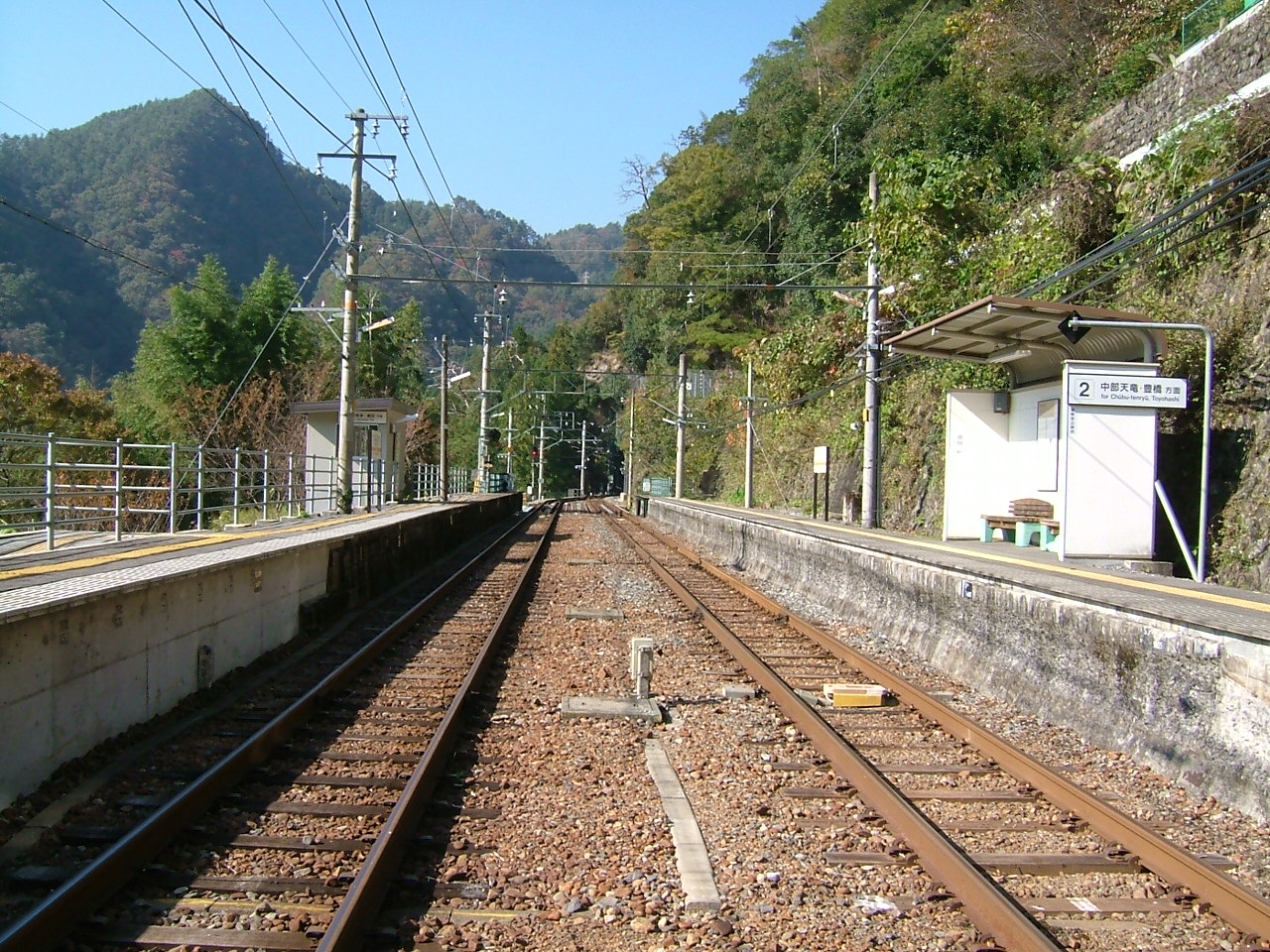
- Ina-Kozawa Station in November 2004

General information
- Location: Hiraoka, Tenryū-mura, Shimoina-gun, Nagano-ken 399-1201; Japan
- Coordinates: 35.2539°N 137.8346°E
- Elevation: 291 m (955 ft)
- Operator: JR Central
- Line: Iida Line
- Distance: 90.1 km from Toyohashi
- Platforms: 2 side platforms

Other information
- Status: Unstaffed

History
- Opened: 30 December 1936

Passengers
- FY2016: 3 (daily)
Location
- Location within Nagano Prefecture Location within Japan

Ina-Kozawa Station (伊那小沢駅, Ina-Kozawa-eki) is a railway station on the Iida Line in the village of Tenryū, Shimoina, Nagano Prefecture, Japan. It is operated by Central Japan Railway Company (JR Central).

== Lines ==
Ina-Kozawa Station is served by the Iida Line and is 90.1 kilometers from the starting point of the line at Toyohashi Station.

== Station layout ==
The station consists of a two opposed ground-level side platforms connected by a level crossing. The station is unattended. There is no station building, but only a waiting room on the platform.

=== Platforms ===
| 1 | ■ Iida Line | for Iida and Tenryūkyō |
| 2 | ■ Iida Line | for Chūbu-Tenryū and Toyohashi |

== Adjacent stations ==
| « | Service | » |
Iida Line
Limited Express "Inaji" (特急「伊那路」): Does not stop at this station
| Nakaisamurai | Local (普通) | Ugusu |

== History ==
Ina-Kozawa Station opened on 30 December 1936. With the privatization of Japanese National Railways (JNR) on 1 April 1987, the station came under the control of JR Central.

== Passenger statistics ==
In fiscal 2016, the station was used by an average of 3 passengers daily (boarding passengers only).

== Surrounding area ==
- Tenryu River

== See also ==
- List of railway stations in Japan
