= Shiteguri Station =

Railway station in Tenryū, Nagano Prefecture, Japan

Shiteguri Station 為栗駅
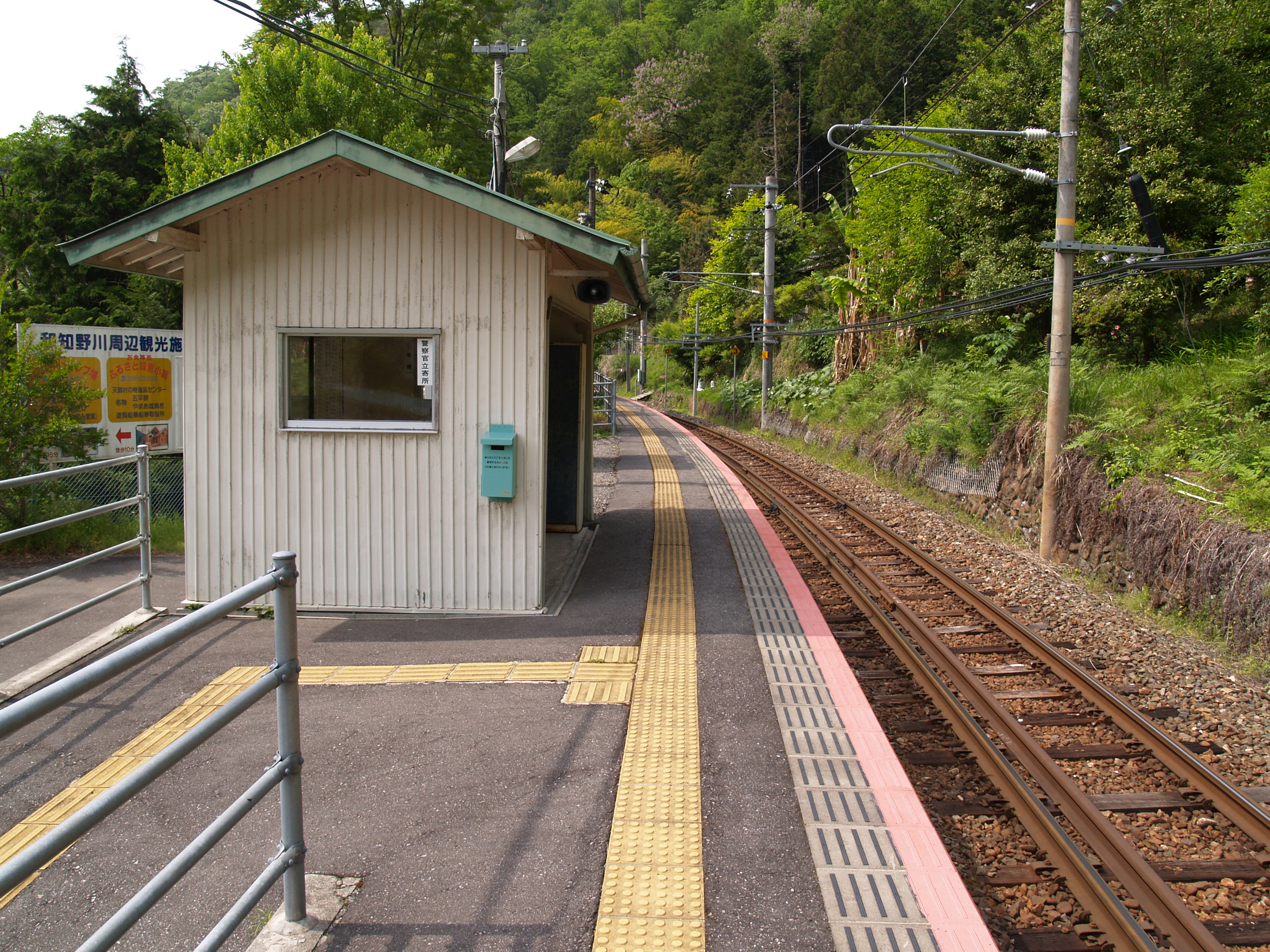
- Shiteguri Station in May 2010

General information
- Location: Hiraoka, Tenryū-mura, Shimoina-gun, Nagano-ken 399-1201; Japan
- Coordinates: 35.3114°N 137.8482°E
- Elevation: 319 m (1,047 ft)
- Operator: JR Central
- Line: Iida Line
- Distance: 98.5 km from Toyohashi
- Platforms: 1 side platform

Other information
- Status: Unstaffed

History
- Opened: 18 August 1936

Passengers
- FY2016: 4 (daily)
Location
- Location within Nagano Prefecture Location within Japan

Shiteguri Station (為栗駅, Shiteguri-eki) is a railway station on the Iida Line in the village of Tenryū, Shimoina, Nagano Prefecture, Japan, operated by Central Japan Railway Company (JR Central).

== Lines ==
Shiteguri Station is served by the Iida Line and is 98.5 kilometers from the starting point of the line at Toyohashi Station.

== Station layout ==
The station consists of a single ground-level side platform serving one bi-directional track. The station is unattended. There is no station building, but only a waiting room on the platform.

== Adjacent stations ==
«	Service	»
Iida Line
Limited Express Inaji: Does not stop at this station
Hiraoka	Local	Nukuta

== History ==
Shiteguri Station opened on 18 August 1936. With the privatization of Japanese National Railways (JNR) on 1 April 1987, the station came under the control of JR Central.

== Passenger statistics ==
In fiscal 2016, the station was used by an average of 4 passengers daily (boarding passengers only).

== Surrounding area ==
- Tenryu River

== See also ==
- List of railway stations in Japan
