= Nakaisamurai Station =

Railway station in Tenryū, Nagano Prefecture, Japan

Nakaisamurai Station 中井侍駅
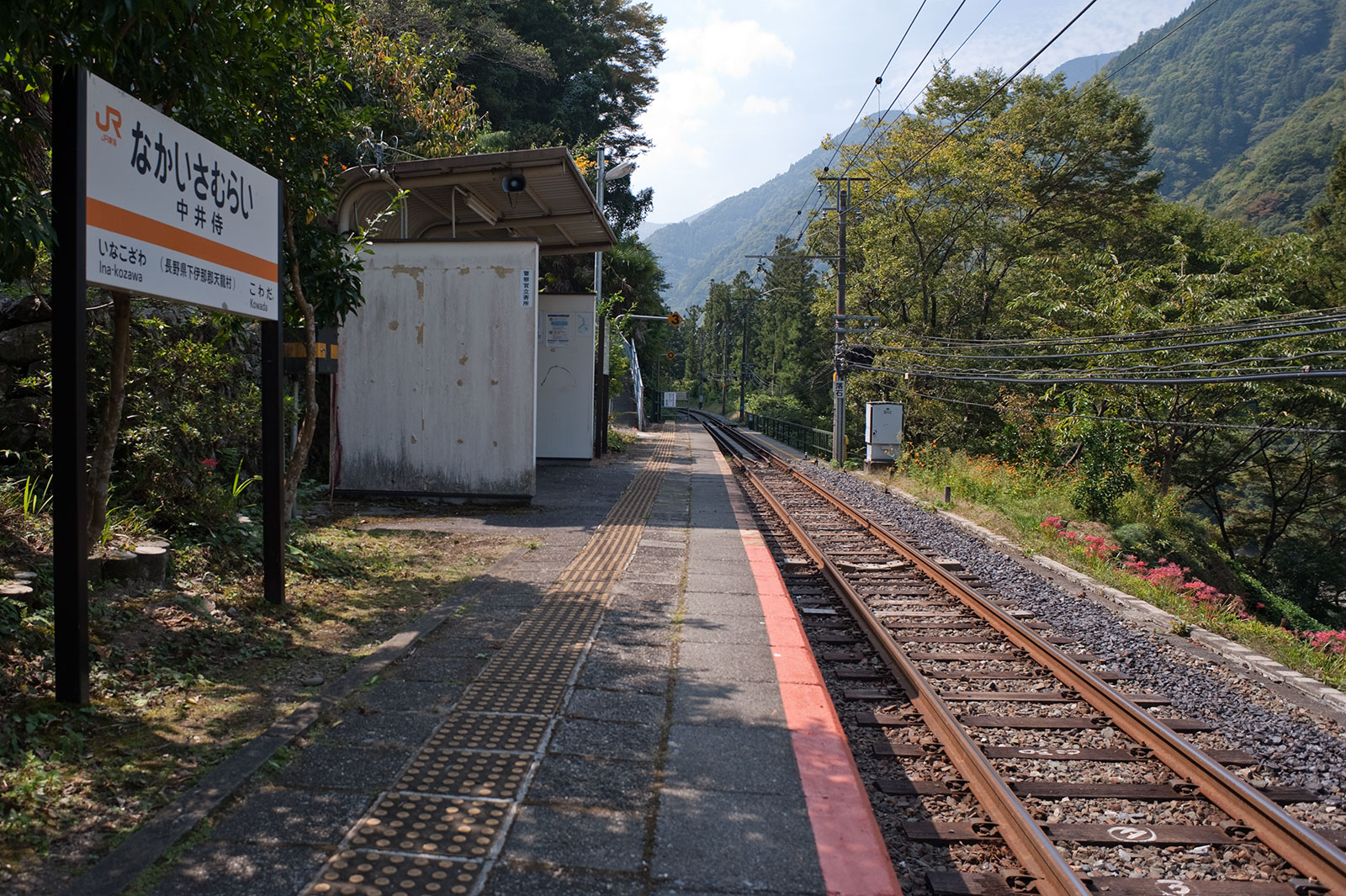
- Nakaisamurai Station in September 2009

General information
- Location: Hiraoka, Tenryū-mura, Shimoina-gun, Nagano-ken 399-1201; Japan
- Coordinates: 35°14′09″N 137°50′06″E
- Elevation: 289 m (948 ft)
- Operator: JR Central
- Line: Iida Line
- Distance: 87.8 km from Toyohashi
- Platforms: 1 side platform

Other information
- Status: Unstaffed

History
- Opened: 30 December 1936

Passengers
- FY2016: 10 (daily)
Location
- Location within Nagano Prefecture Location within Japan

Nakaisamurai Station (中井侍駅, Nakaisamurai-eki) is a railway station on the Iida Line in the village of Tenryū, Shimoina, Nagano Prefecture, Japan, operated by Central Japan Railway Company (JR Central).

== Lines ==
Nakaisamurai Station is served by the Iida Line and is 87.8 kilometers from the starting point of the line at Toyohashi Station.

== Station layout ==
The station consists of a single ground-level side platform serving one bi-directional track. The station is unattended. There is no station building, but only a waiting room on the platform.

== Adjacent stations ==
«	Service	»
Iida Line
Limited Express "Inaji" (特急「伊那路」): Does not stop at this station
Kowada	Local (普通)	Ina-Kozawa

== History ==
Nakaisamurai Station opened on 30 December 1936. With the privatization of Japanese National Railways (JNR) on 1 April 1987, the station came under the control of JR Central.

== Passenger statistics ==
In fiscal 2016, the station was used by an average of 10 passengers daily (boarding passengers only).

== Surrounding area ==
- The station is in a rural area surrounded by tea fields, with no buildings nearby.

== See also ==
- List of railway stations in Japan
