= Karakasa Station =

Railway station in Yasuoka, Nagano Prefecture, Japan

Karakasa Station 唐笠駅
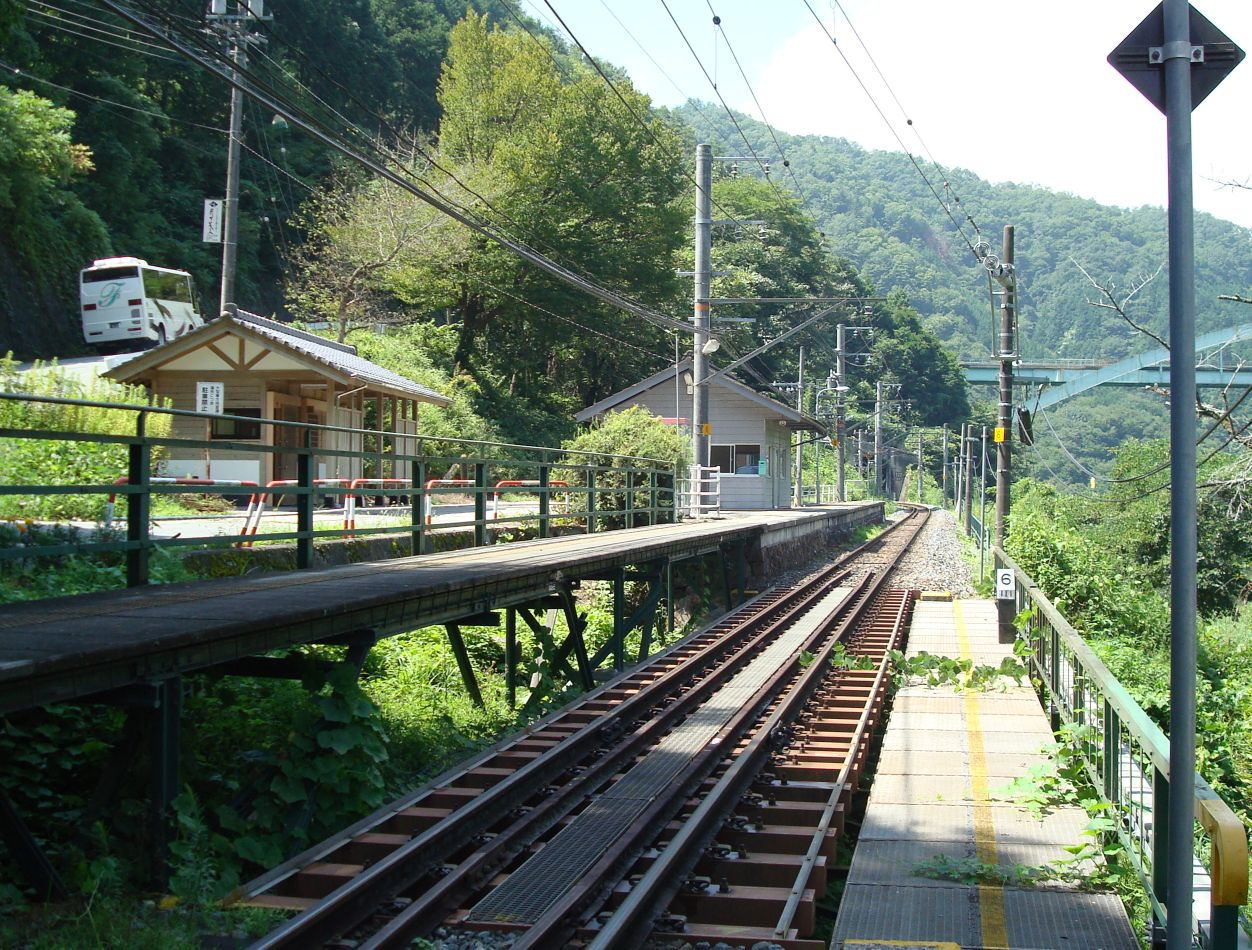
- Karakasa Station in August 2008

General information
- Location: Karakasa, Yasuoka-mura, Shimoina-gun, Nagano-ken 399-1801; Japan
- Coordinates: 35.4023°N 137.8102°E
- Elevation: 367 m (1,204 ft)
- Operator: JR Central
- Line: Iida Line
- Distance: 111.3 km from Toyohashi
- Platforms: 1 side platform

Other information
- Status: Unstaffed

History
- Opened: 30 October 1932

Passengers
- FY2016: 18 (daily)
Location
- Location within Nagano Prefecture Location within Japan

Karakasa Station (唐笠駅, Karakasa-eki) is a railway station on the Iida Line in the village of Yasuoka, Shimoina, Nagano Prefecture, Japan, operated by Central Japan Railway Company (JR Central).

== Lines ==
Karakasa Station is served by the Iida Line and is 111.3 kilometers from the starting point of the line at Toyohashi Station.

== Station layout ==
The station consists of a single ground-level side platform serving one bi-directional track. The station is unattended.

== Adjacent stations ==
«	Service	»
Iida Line
Limited Express "Inaji" (特急「伊那路」): Does not stop at this station
Kadoshima	Local (普通)	Kinno

== History ==
Karakasa Station opened on 30 October 1932. With the privatization of Japanese National Railways (JNR) on 1 April 1987, the station came under the control of JR Central.

== Passenger statistics ==
In fiscal 2016, the station was used by an average of 18 passengers daily (boarding passengers only).

== Surrounding area ==
- Tenryū River

== See also ==
- List of railway stations in Japan
