= Nukuta Station =

Railway station in Yasuoka, Nagano Prefecture, Japan

Nukuta Station 温田駅
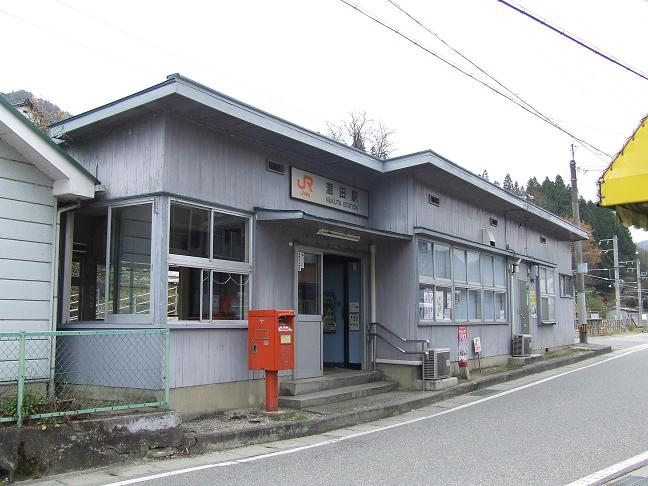
- Nukuta Station in September 2009

General information
- Location: Nakata, Yasuoka-mura, Shimoina-gun, Nagano-ken 399-1801; Japan
- Coordinates: 35.3355°N 137.8413°E
- Elevation: 340 m (1,120 ft)
- Operator: JR Central
- Line: Iida Line
- Distance: 102.2 km from Toyohashi
- Platforms: 1 island platform

Other information
- Status: Unstaffed

History
- Opened: 15 November 1935

Passengers
- FY2016: 247 (daily)
Location
- Location within Nagano Prefecture Location within Japan

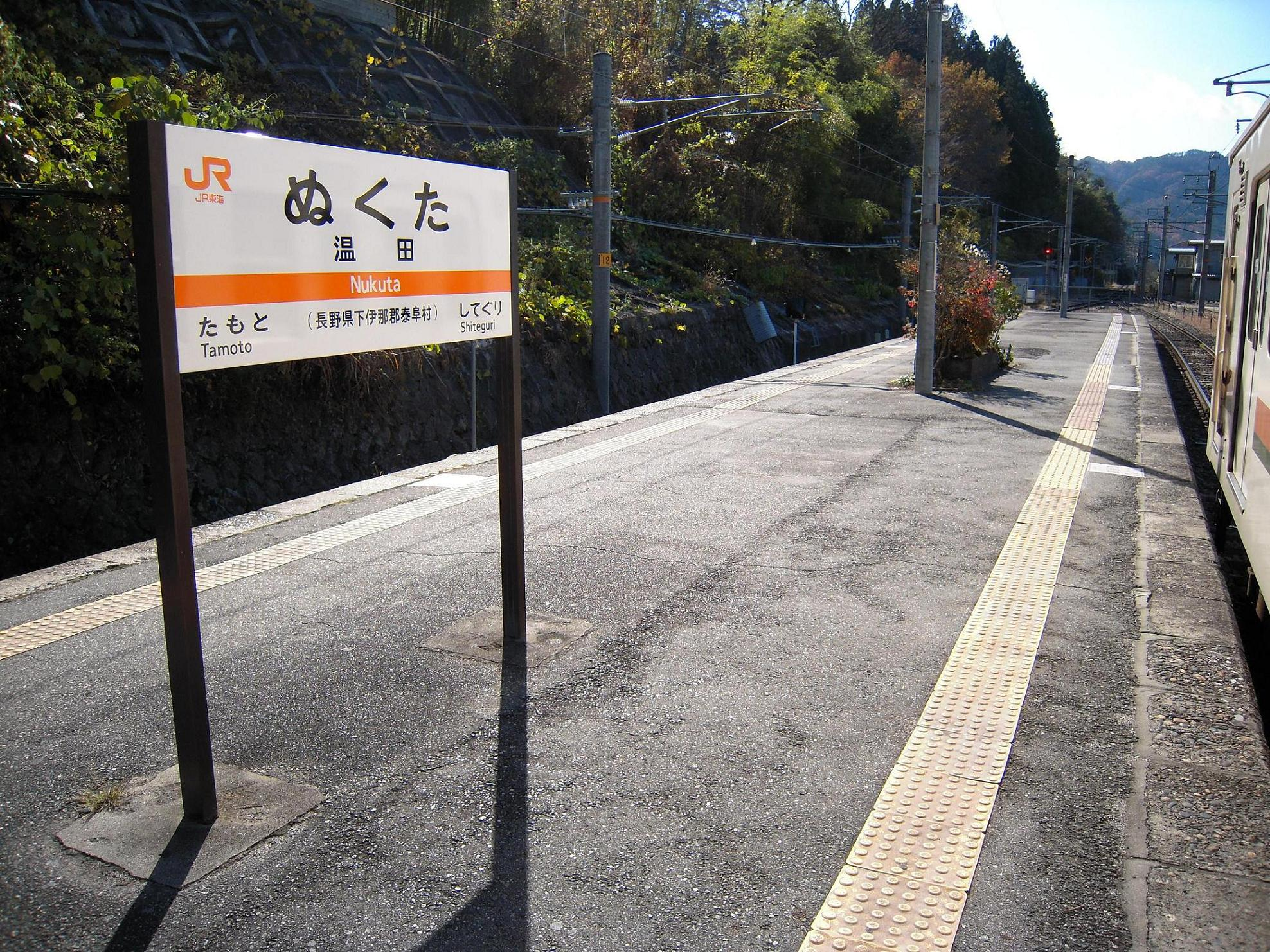
Platform

Nukuta Station (温田駅, Nukuta-eki) is a railway station on the Iida Line in the village of Yasuoka, Shimoina, Nagano Prefecture, Japan, operated by Central Japan Railway Company (JR Central).

== Lines ==
Nukuta Station is served by the Iida Line and is 102.2 kilometers from the starting point of the line at Toyohashi Station.

== Station layout ==
The station consists of a single ground-level island platform connected to the station building by a level crossing. The station is unattended.

=== Platforms ===
1	■ Iida Line	for Iida and Tenryūkyō
2	■ Iida Line	for Chūbu-Tenryū and Toyohashi

== Adjacent stations ==
«	Service	»
Iida Line
Hiraoka	Limited Express Inaji	Tenryūkyō
Shiteguri	Local	Tamoto

== History ==
Nukuta Station opened on 15 November 1935. With the privatization of Japanese National Railways (JNR) on 1 April 1987, the station came under the control of JR Central.

== Passenger statistics ==
In fiscal 2016, the station was used by an average of 247 passengers daily (boarding passengers only).

== Surrounding area ==
- Tenryū River
- Nukata Post Office

== See also ==
- List of railway stations in Japan
