= Yasuoka, Nagano =

Village in Nagano Prefecture, Japan

Yasuoka 泰阜村
- Village
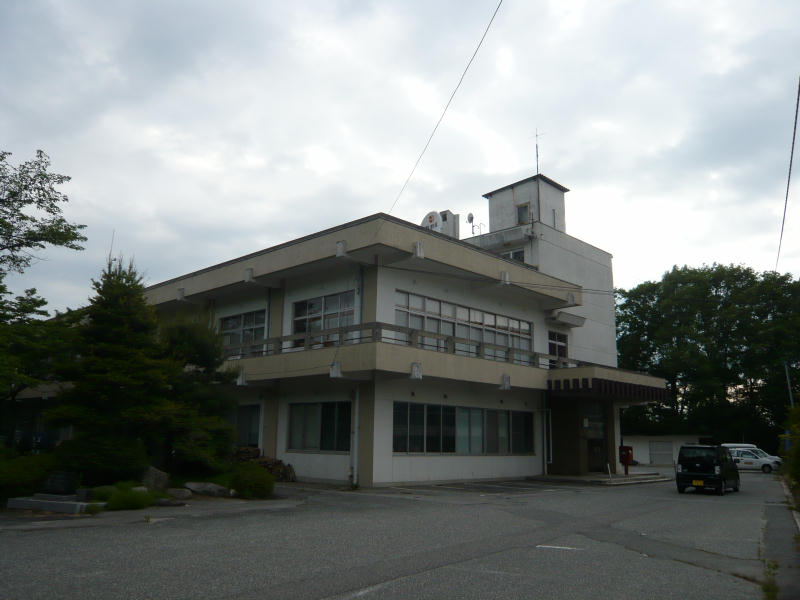
- Yasuoka Village Hall

- Flag Seal

- Location of Yasuoka in Nagano Prefecture

- Coordinates: 35°22′38.6″N 137°50′45.5″E
- Country: Japan
- Region: Chūbu (Kōshin'etsu)
- Prefecture: Nagano
- District: Shimoina

Area
  - Total: 64.59 km^{2} (24.94 sq mi)

Population (April 2019)
  - Total: 1,622
  - Density: 25.11/km^{2} (65.04/sq mi)
- Time zone: UTC+9 (Japan Standard Time)
- Symbols
  - Tree: Pine
  - Flower: Erythronium japonicum
  - Bird: Copper pheasant
- Phone number: 0260-26-2111
- Address: 3236-1 Yasuoka-mura, Shimoina-gun, Nagano-ken 399-1895
- Website: Official website

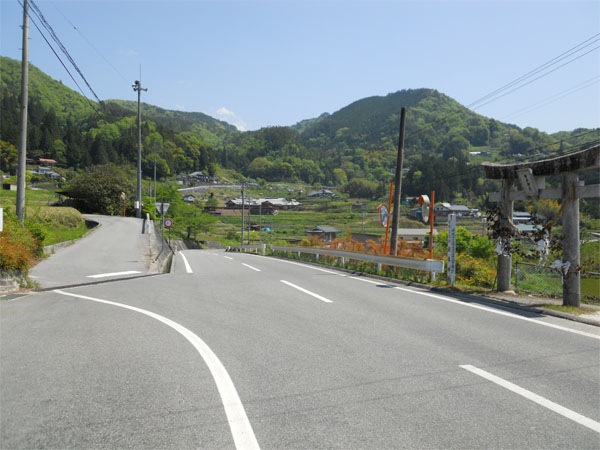
Tamoro hamlet in Yasuoka

Yasuoka (泰阜村, Yasuoka-mura) is a village located in Nagano Prefecture, Japan. As of 1 April 2019, the village had an estimated population of 1,622 in 688 households, and a population density of 25 persons per km^{2}. The total area of the village is 64.59 square kilometres (24.94 sq mi).

== Geography ==
Yasuoka is located in mountainous far south of Nagano Prefecture. The Tenryū River runs through the northern portion of the village.

=== Surrounding municipalities ===
- Nagano Prefecture
  - Anan
  - Iida
  - Shimojō
  - Tenryū

=== Climate ===
The town has a climate characterized by hot and humid summers, and cold winters (Köppen climate classification Cfa). The average annual temperature in Yasuoka is 11.9 °C. The average annual rainfall is 1904 mm with September as the wettest month. The temperatures are highest on average in August, at around 23.8 °C, and lowest in January, at around 0.3 °C.

== Demographics ==
Per Japanese census data, the population of Yasuoka has declined severely in recent years.

Historical population
Year	Pop.	±%
1940	3,964	—
1950	4,620	+16.5%
1960	4,139	−10.4%
1970	3,189	−23.0%
1980	2,613	−18.1%
1990	2,386	−8.7%
2000	2,237	−6.2%
2010	1,911	−14.6%
2020	1,542	−19.3%

== History ==
The area of present-day Yasuoka was part of ancient Shinano Province. The village of Yasuoka established on April 1, 1889 by the establishment of the modern municipalities system. In the late 1930s, a large number of inhabitants from Yasuoka were settled in Manchukuo.

== Education ==
Yasuoka has one public elementary school and one public middle school operated by the village government. The village does not have a high school.

== Transportation ==
=== Railway ===
- JR Tōkai – Iida Line
  - Nukuta - Tamoto - Kadoshima - Karakasa - Kinno

=== Highway ===
- The village is not served by any national highway
