= Hiraoka Station (Nagano) =

Railway station in Tenryū, Nagano Prefecture, Japan

Hiraoka Station 平岡駅
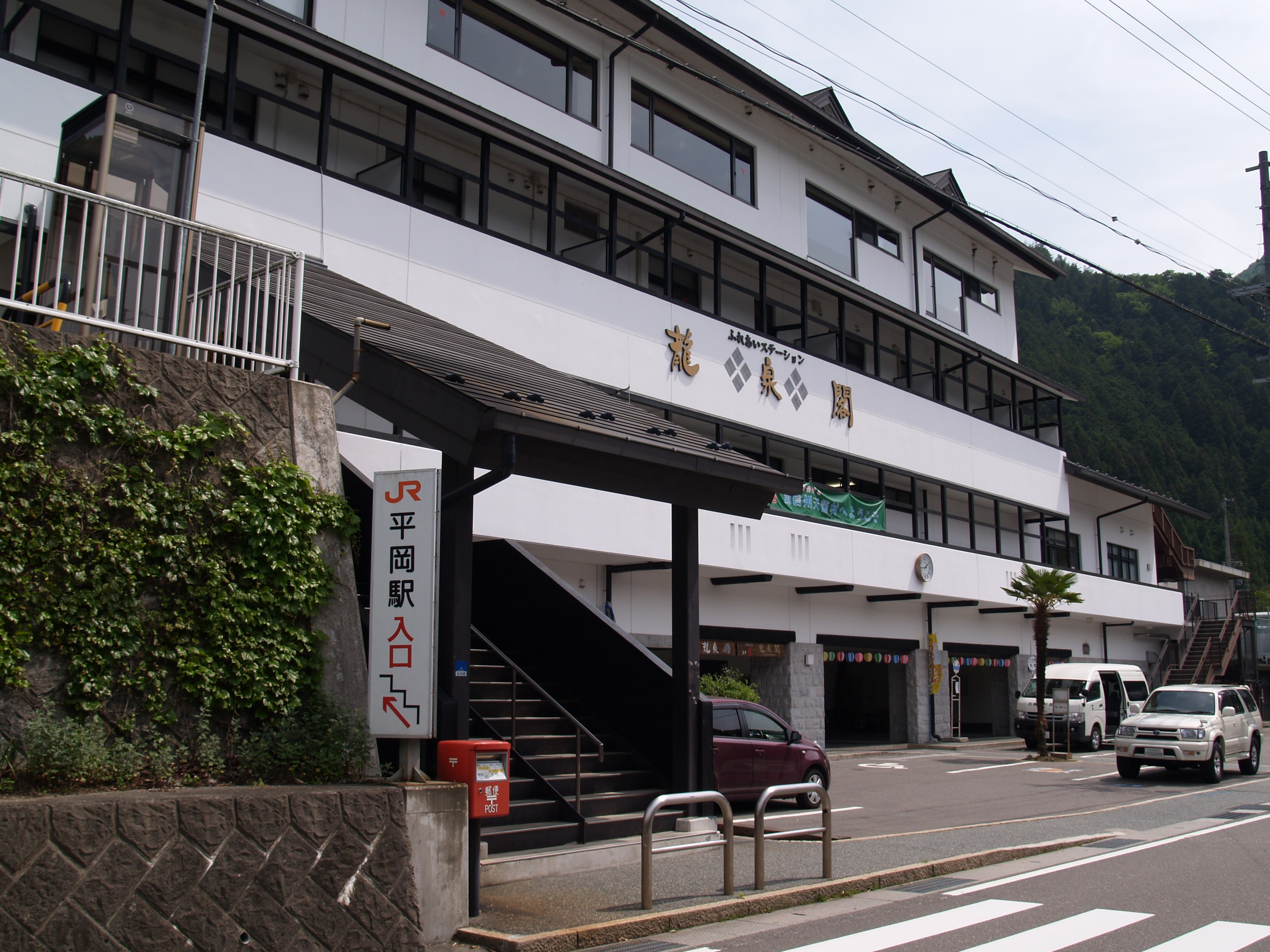
- Hiraoka Station in May 2010

General information
- Location: Hiraoka, Tenryū-mura, Shimoina-gun, Nagano-ken 399-1201; Japan
- Coordinates: 35.2730°N 137.8533°E
- Elevation: 324 m (1,063 ft)
- Operator: JR Central
- Line: Iida Line
- Distance: 93.8 km from Toyohashi
- Platforms: 1 island platform

Other information
- Status: Staffed

History
- Opened: 16 April 1936
- Former names: Mitsushima Station (to 1952)

Passengers
- FY2016: 64 (daily)
Location
- Location within Nagano Prefecture Location within Japan

Hiraoka Station (平岡駅, Hiraoka-eki) is a railway station on the Iida Line in the village of Tenryū, Shimoina, Nagano Prefecture, Japan, operated by Central Japan Railway Company (JR Central).

== Lines ==
Hiraoka Station is served by the Iida Line and is 93.8 kilometers from the starting point of the line at Toyohashi Station.

== Station layout ==
The station consists of a single ground-level island platform connected to the station building by a level crossing. The station is staffed.

=== Platforms ===
1	■ Iida Line	for Iida and Tenryūkyō
2	■ Iida Line	for Chūbu-Tenryū and Toyohashi

== Adjacent stations ==
«	Service	»
Iida Line
Misakubo	Limited Express Inaji	Nukuta
Ugusu	Local	Shiteguri

== History ==
Hiraoka Station opened on 26 April 1936 as Mitsushima Station (満島駅). It was renamed to its present name on 15 November 1952. With the privatization of Japanese National Railways (JNR) on 1 April 1987, the station came under the control of JR Central.

== Passenger statistics ==
In fiscal 2016, the station was used by an average of 64 passengers daily (boarding passengers only).

== Surrounding area ==
- Tenryū Village Hall
- Tenryū Elementary School
- Tenryū Junior High School

== See also ==
- List of railway stations in Japan
