= Shimojō =

Shimojō 下條村
- Village
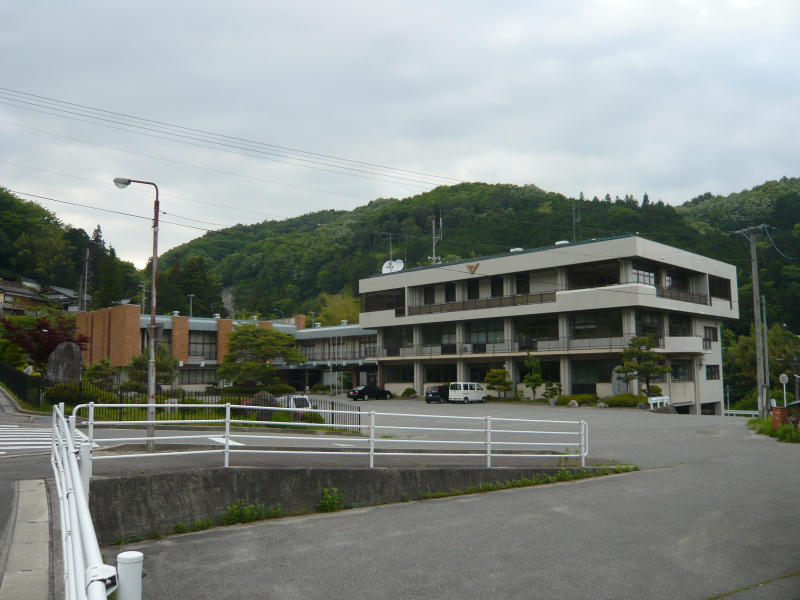
- Shimojō Village Hall

- Flag Seal

- Location of Shimojō in Nagano Prefecture

- Coordinates: 35°23′50.4″N 137°47′9.1″E
- Country: Japan
- Region: Chūbu (Kōshin'etsu)
- Prefecture: Nagano
- District: Shimoina

Area
  - Total: 38.12 km^{2} (14.72 sq mi)

Population (2020)
  - Total: 3,545
  - Density: 93.00/km^{2} (240.9/sq mi)
- Time zone: UTC+9 (Japan Standard Time)
- Symbols
  - Tree: Acer pycnanthum
  - Flower: Cosmos
- Phone number: 0260-27-2311
- Address: 8801-1 Mutsuzawa, Shimojō-mura, Shimoina-gun, Nagano-ken 399-2101
- Website: Official website

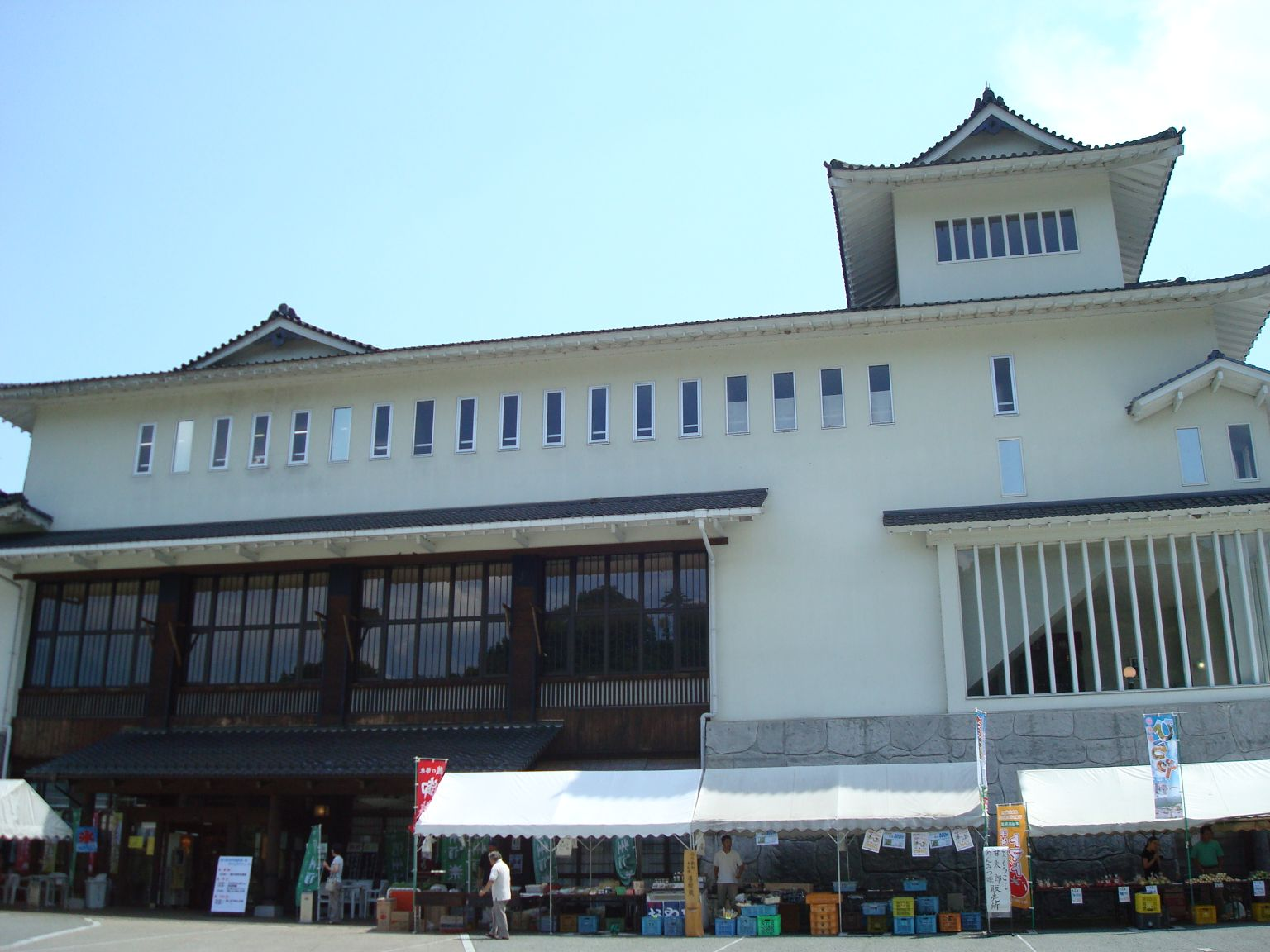
Roadstation in Shimojō Village

Shimojō (下條村, Shimojō-mura) is a village located in Nagano Prefecture, Japan. As of 1 April 2019, the village had an estimated population of 3,748 in 1275 households, and a population density of 98 persons per km^{2}. The percentage of the population over 65 years old was 33.78%. The total area of the village is 38.12 square kilometres (14.72 sq mi).

== Geography ==
Shimojō is located mountainous southern Nagano Prefecture.

=== Surrounding municipalities ===
- Nagano Prefecture
  - Achi
  - Anan
  - Iida
  - Yasuoka

=== Climate ===
The town has a climate characterized by hot and humid summers, and cold winters (Köppen climate classification Cfa). The average annual temperature in Shimojō is 12.6 °C. The average annual rainfall is 1857 mm with September as the wettest month. The temperatures are highest on average in August, at around 24.6 °C, and lowest in January, at around -0.8 °C.

== Demographics ==
Per Japanese census data, the population of Shimojō has seen some success in reversing decades of decline. The village of Shimojō has defied the declining birthrate noted in Japan as well increasing capital revenue by increasing worker efficiency. In 2003–2005, the village birthrate, "was 2.12...against the national average of 1.25 in 2005" while, "...personal expenses were cut by ¥450 million". Reforms have thus allowed the village to grow without government subsidies due to its sufficient capital which has allowed the village, as village head Ito Kihei remarks, to offer, "places to enjoy...such facilities as a mobile library, a swimming pool and a culture hall [while] enriching the child-raising environment and assistance by making medical expenses free for children through junior high school."

Historical population
Year	Pop.	±%
1940	5,447	—
1950	6,412	+17.7%
1960	5,016	−21.8%
1970	4,057	−19.1%
1980	4,078	+0.5%
1990	3,859	−5.4%
2000	4,075	+5.6%
2010	4,200	+3.1%
2020	3,545	−15.6%

== History ==
The area of present-day Shimojō was part of ancient Shinano Province. The village of Shimojō was established on April 1, 1889 with the establishment of the modern municipalities system.

== Economy ==
The economy of Shimojō is primarily agricultural. Principal crops include buckwheat, pears, apples and dried persimmons.

== Education ==
Shimojō has one public elementary school and one public middle school operated by the village government. The village does not have a high school.

== Transportation ==
=== Railway ===
- The village does not have any passenger railway service

=== Highway ===
- National Route 151
