= Namiai, Nagano =

Dissolved municipality in Nagano prefecture, Japan

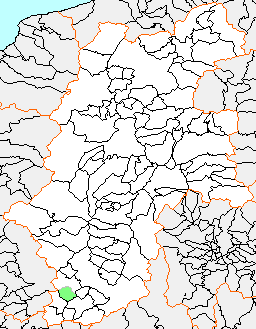
Map of Namiai, Nagano

Namiai (浪合村, Namiai-mura) was a village located in Shimoina District, Nagano Prefecture, Japan.

As of 2003, the village had an estimated population of 766 and a density of 13.38 persons per km^{2}. The total area was 57.24 km^{2}.

On January 1, 2006, Namiai was merged into the expanded village of Achi.
