= Kowada Station =

Railway station in Hamamatsu, Japan

Kowada Station 小和田駅
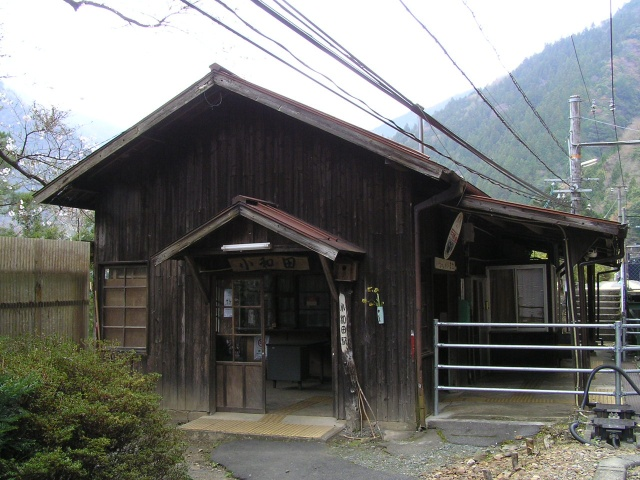
- Kowada Station in April 2005

General information
- Location: Misakubo-cho Okuryoke 14, Tenryū-ku, Hamamatsu-shi, Shizuoka-ken; Japan
- Coordinates: 35°12′36″N 137°50′10″E
- Operator: JR Central
- Line: Iida Line
- Distance: 83.8 km from Toyohashi
- Platforms: 1 side platform

Other information
- Status: Unstaffed

History
- Opened: December 30, 1936

Passengers
- FY2017: 3 (daily)
Location
- Location within Shizuoka Prefecture Location within Japan

Kowada Station (小和田駅, Kowada-eki) is a railway station on the Iida Line in Tenryū-ku, Hamamatsu, Shizuoka Prefecture, Japan, operated by Central Japan Railway Company (JR Central). It is one of Japan's most well-known hikyō stations.

== Lines ==
Kowada Station is served by the Iida Line and is 83.8 kilometers from the starting point of the line at Toyohashi Station.

== Station layout ==
The station has one ground-level side platform serving a single bi-directional track, with a small wooden station building. Until 2008, the station had dual opposed side platforms, but one platform has since been discontinued. The station is not attended.

== Adjacent stations ==
«	Service	»
Iida Line
Limited Express "Inaji" (特急「伊那路」): Does not stop at this station
Ōzore	Local (普通)	Nakaisamurai

== History ==
Kowada Station was established on December 30, 1936, as the terminal station of the now-defunct Sanshin Railway. On August 1, 1943, the Sanshin Railway was nationalized along with several other local lines to form the Iida line. All freight services were discontinued in December 1971 and the station has been unstaffed since February 1984. Along with the division and privatization of JNR on April 1, 1987, the station came under the control and operation of the Central Japan Railway Company.

== Passenger statistics ==
In fiscal 2016, the station was used by an average of 8 passengers daily (boarding passengers only). In fiscal 2019, it was used by 3 passengers daily.

== Surrounding area ==
The station is located in an isolated area near the border of Shizuoka Prefecture with Nagano and Aichi and is not accessible by road. The nearest road (towards Sakuma Dam) is a 40- to 50-minute walk.

== See also ==
- List of railway stations in Japan
