= Tenryū, Nagano =

Tenryū 天龍村
- Village
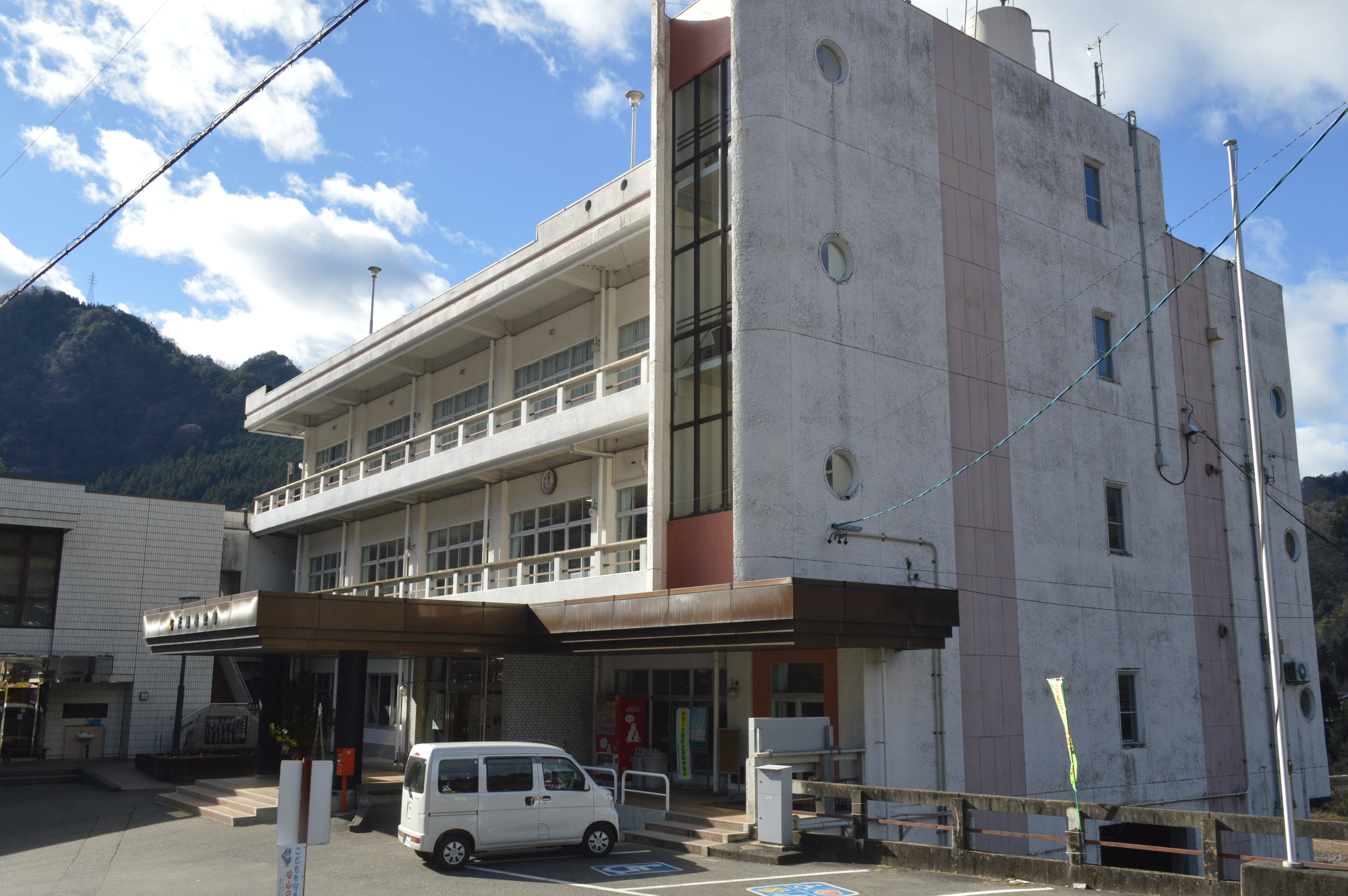
- Tenryū Village Hall

- Flag Seal

- Location of Tenryū in Nagano Prefecture

- Coordinates: 35°16′34.9″N 137°51′15.2″E
- Country: Japan
- Region: Chūbu (Kōshin'etsu)
- Prefecture: Nagano
- District: Shimoina

Area
  - Total: 109.44 km^{2} (42.26 sq mi)

Population (April 2019)
  - Total: 1,275
  - Density: 11.65/km^{2} (30.17/sq mi)
- Time zone: UTC+9 (Japan Standard Time)
- Symbols
  - Tree: Trachycarpus
  - Flower: Lilium auratum
  - Bird: Dollarbird
- Phone number: 0260-26-2111
- Address: 878 Hiraoka Tenryū-mura, Shimoina-gun, Nagano-ken 399-1201
- Website: Official website

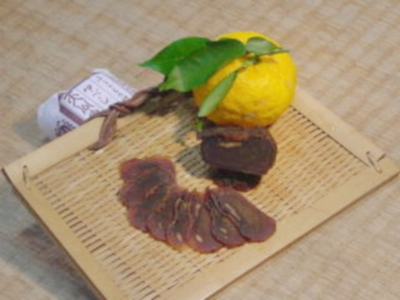
Yubeshi, a local specialty of Tenryū

Tenryū (天龍村, Tenryū-mura) is a village located in Nagano Prefecture, Japan. As of 1 April 2019, the village had an estimated population of 1,275 in 712 households, and a population density of 12.1 persons per km^{2}. The total area of the village is 109.44 square kilometres (42.26 sq mi).

== Geography ==
Tenryū is located in mountainous far south of Nagano Prefecture on its border with Aichi Prefecture and Shizuoka Prefecture. The Tenryū River runs through the village, which is over 90% covered in mountains and forest. Hiraoka Dam is located within Tenryū.

=== Surrounding municipalities ===
- Aichi Prefecture
  - Toyone
- Nagano Prefecture
  - Anan
  - IIda
  - Yasuoka
- Shizuoka Prefecture
  - Hamamatsu

=== Climate ===
The town has a climate characterized by hot and humid summers, and cold winters (Köppen climate classification Cfa). The average annual temperature in Tenryū is 13.3 °C. The average annual rainfall is 1964 mm with September as the wettest month. The temperatures are highest on average in August, at around 25.1 °C, and lowest in January, at around 1.9 °C.

== Demographics ==
Per Japanese census data, the population of Tenryū has dropped rapidly over the past 70 years.

Historical population
Year	Pop.	±%
1940	5,763	—
1950	8,337	+44.7%
1960	5,792	−30.5%
1970	4,222	−27.1%
1980	3,389	−19.7%
1990	2,822	−16.7%
2000	2,239	−20.7%
2010	1,657	−26.0%
2020	1,178	−28.9%

== History ==
The area of present-day Tenryū was part of ancient Shinano Province. The village was established on September 30, 1956 by the merger of the villages of Hiraoka and Kamihara.

== Education ==
Tenryū has one public elementary school and one public middle school operated by the village government, and one private elementary school and one private middle school. The village does not have a high school.

== Transportation ==
=== Railway ===
- JR Tōkai – Iida Line
  - Nakaisamurai - Ina-Kozawa - Ugusu - Hiraoka - Shiteguri

=== Highway ===
- National Route 418
