= Seinaiji, Nagano =

Seinaiji 清内路村
- Former municipality
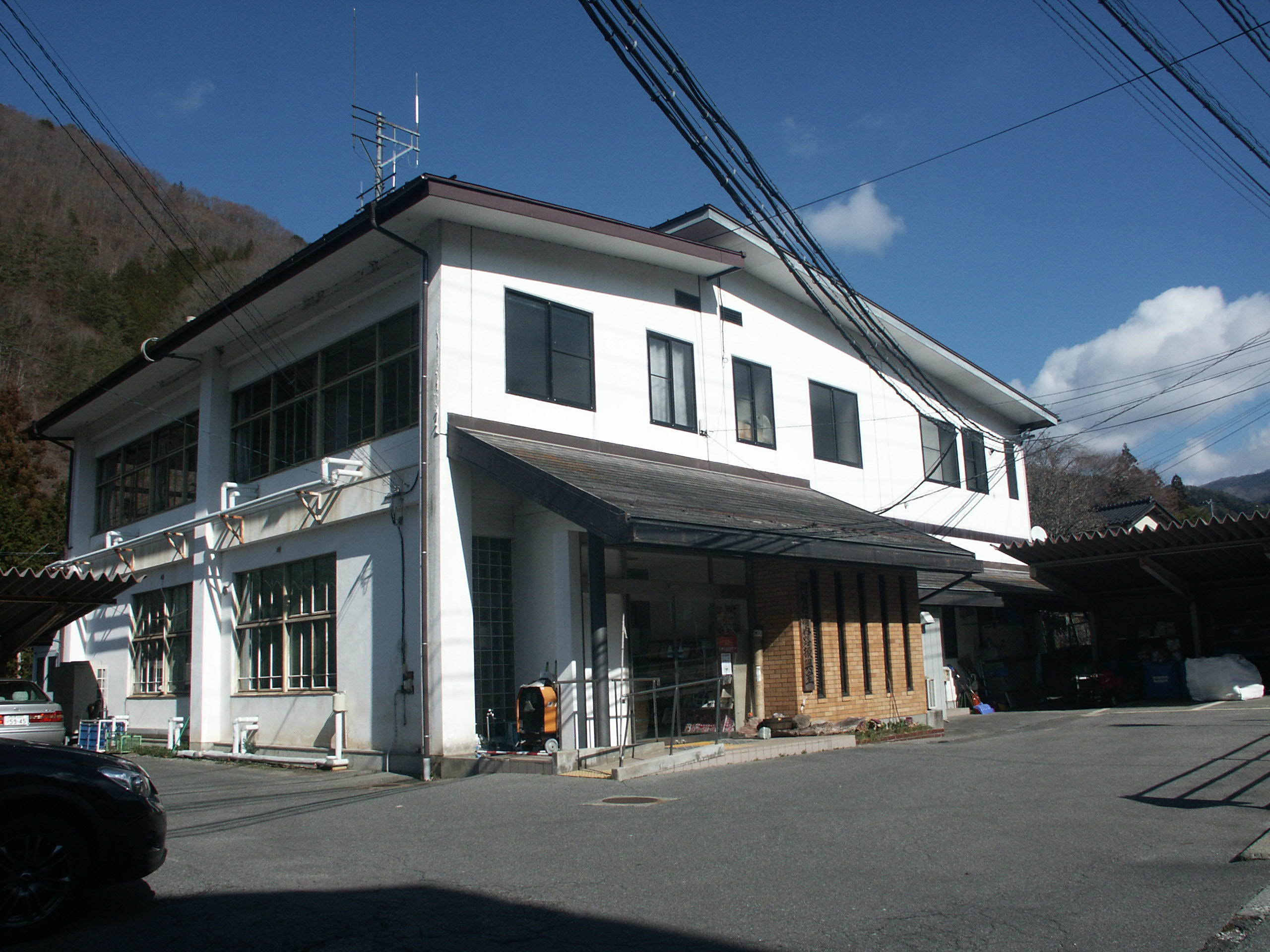
- Former Seinaiji village hall

- Location in Japan
- Coordinates: 35°29′N 137°42′E
- Country: Japan
- Region: Chūbu
- Prefecture: Nagano Prefecture
- District: Shimoina
- Merged: March 31, 2009 (now part of Achi)

Area
  - Total: 44.16 km^{2} (17.05 sq mi)

Population (2003)
  - Total: 748
- Time zone: UTC+09:00 (JST)
- Website: Village of Achi
- Symbols
- Flower: shidarezakura
- Tree: oak

Seinaiji (清内路村, Seinaiji-mura) was a village located in Shimoina District, Nagano Prefecture, Japan.

== Population ==
As of 2003, the village had an estimated population of 748 and a density of 16.94 persons per km^{2}. The total area was 44.16 km^{2}.

== Education ==
The village has an elementary and a junior high school, both of which have a weekly visit from a Native English Speaker. At the time of writing, this teacher was Louise Beard from England. The village also has a kindergarten.

== Attractions ==
Seinaiji is famous for its fireworks displays. All the fireworks are made by hand in the village and at the festival people dance underneath them. It is common for people to get mild burns from this ritual.

In Seinaiji, there stands an ancient sakura (cherry blossom) tree that people take bus trips to see when it is in bloom.

== Location ==
Seinaiji is located close to Iida City on Route 256.

== History ==
As of March 31, 2009; Senaiji was merged into the expanded village of Achi. Both Senaiji and Achi are in Shimoina District.
