= Hikyō station =

Japanese term for little-used railway station

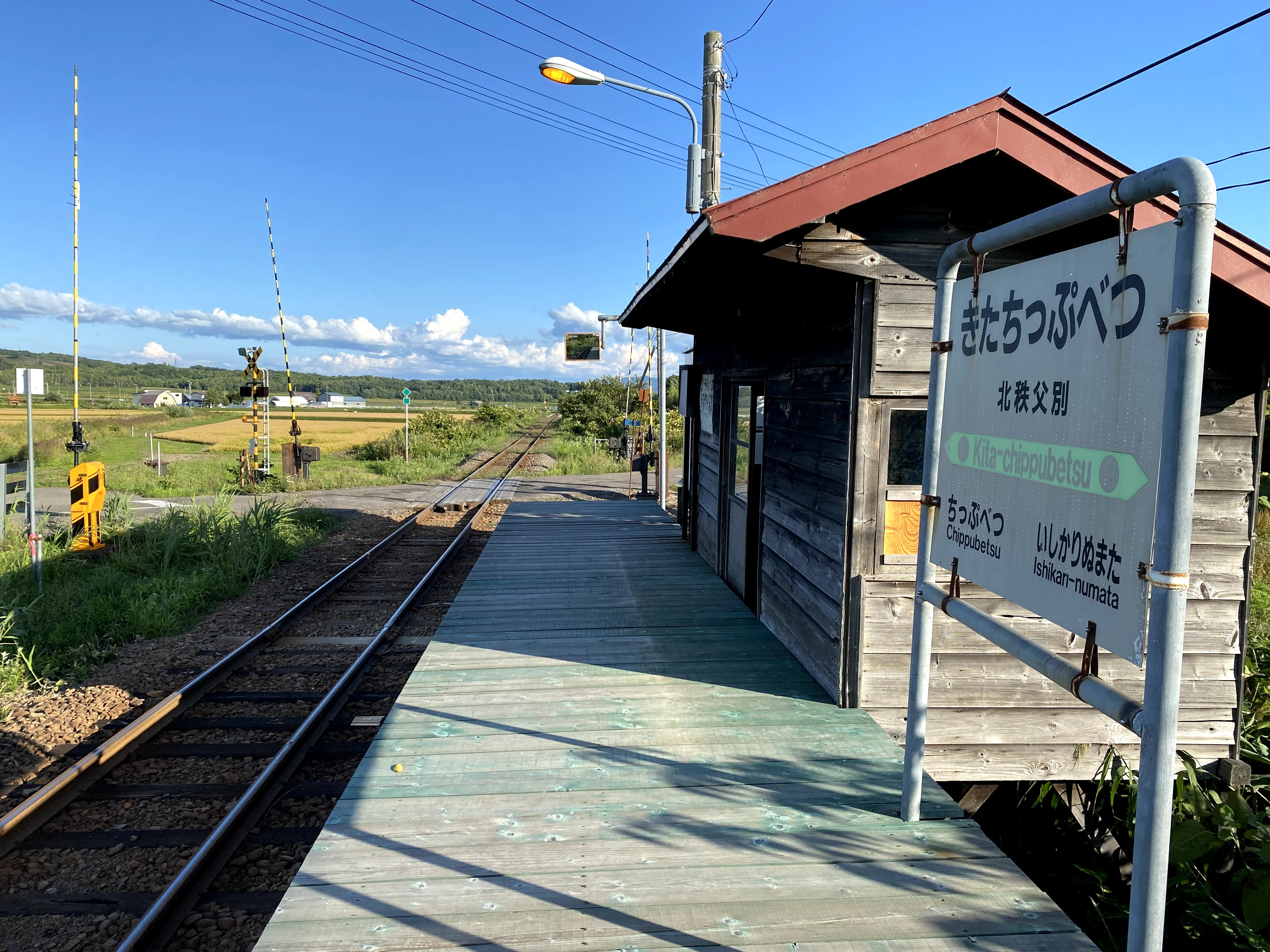
The former Kita-Chippubetsu Station (Rumoi Main Line) in Hokkaido.

A hikyō station (秘境駅, hikyō eki), or "secluded station", is the Japanese language name for railway stations that are little used and isolated. Photographers and rail fans visit the stations to take photos of historical stations and trains or photos of nature.

The Japanese term was invented by Takanobu Ushiyama and his friends when he began a website in 1999 dedicated to these stations. He subsequently wrote two books: Hikyo-eki e Iko! ("Let's Go to Hikyō Stations!"), published by Shogakukan Inc. in 2001 and Motto Hikyo-eki e Iko! ("Let's Go to More Hikyō Stations!"), published in 2003. The term is now also used in other countries like Taiwan, especially among train fans.

== Summary ==
Hikyō stations are generally located in areas that previously had a sizeable human population due to mountain climbing and related activities, but currently have very few inhabitants and houses. Because of this lack of population, trains no longer make regular stops, and train and rail fans have adopted these as popular locations for visiting. Because of the lack of regular passenger custom, the stations see little use these days, and many are being considered for closure.

Beginning with the personal site of train enthusiast Takanobu Ushiyama, and a subsequent book published in 2001 by Shogakukan, the general awareness of these hikyō stations has increased. In 2004, a television program about hikyō stations aired on SkyPerfecTV's Travel Channel. Along with Hirohiko Yokomi's Tetsuko no Tabi manga, many of these stations were introduced to the public. Since Ushiyama's site and book were released, there has been an increase in graffiti and dangerous activities around train crossings and tunnels, in addition to the increase of regular passengers going to these stations. Ushiyama has mentioned on his site and in his book practically every news story and fact about the use of fire at places such as the railroad crossings and closed station buildings. After an incident which resulted in injuries at Hariusu Station (operated by JR Hokkaido), year-round service at that station was stopped. This also prompted an effort to deal with the security at these stations.

Even with these issues, there is still a steady, if small, stream of visitors to these hikyō stations. These visitors provide the livelihood for those in these secluded and less well-known stations, despite any negative issues caused by a small number of accidents.

The Central Japan Railway Iida Line, which has many such stations, including Kowada Station, along its rugged mountainous route is known as the "holy land for those who love touring hikyo-eki."

== External links and references ==
- (in Japanese) Let's Go to the Secluded Stations! – Original hikyō station website run by Takanobu Ushiyama
