= Chiyo Station =

Railway station in Iida, Nagano Prefecture, Japan

Chiyo Station 千代駅
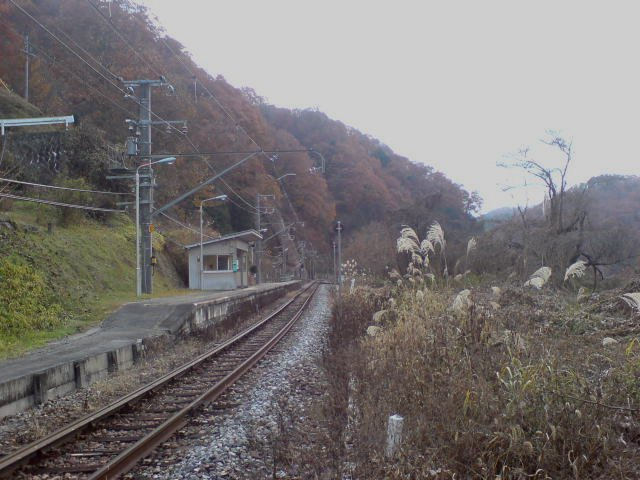
- Chiyo Station

General information
- Location: 732 Chiyo, Iida-shi, Nagano-ken 399-2223; Japan
- Coordinates: 35.4289°N 137.8167°E
- Elevation: 380 meters
- Operator: JR Central
- Line: Iida Line
- Distance: 114.8 km from Toyohashi
- Platforms: 1 side platform

Other information
- Status: Unstaffed

History
- Opened: 30 October 1932

Passengers
- FY2015: 1 daily
Location
- Location within Nagano Prefecture Location within Japan

Chiyo Station (千代駅, Chiyo-eki) is a railway station on the Iida Line in the city of Iida, Nagano Prefecture, Japan, operated by Central Japan Railway Company (JR Central).

== Lines ==
Chiyo Station is served by the Iida Line and is 114.8 kilometers from the starting point of the line at Toyohashi Station.

== Station layout ==
The station consists of a single ground-level side platform serving one bi-directional track. There is no station building, but only a platform built on top of the platform. The station is unattended.

== Adjacent stations ==
| « | Service | » |
Iida Line
Limited Express Inaji: Does not stop at this station
| Kinno | Local | Tenryūkyō |

== History ==
Chiyo Station opened on 30 October 1932. With the privatization of Japanese National Railways (JNR) on 1 April 1987, the station came under the control of JR Central.

== Passenger statistics ==
In fiscal 2015, the station was used by an average of 1 passenger daily (boarding passengers only).

== Surrounding area ==
The station is located in an isolated rural area near the Tenryū River.

== See also ==
- List of railway stations in Japan
