= Achi, Nagano =

Achi 阿智村
- Village
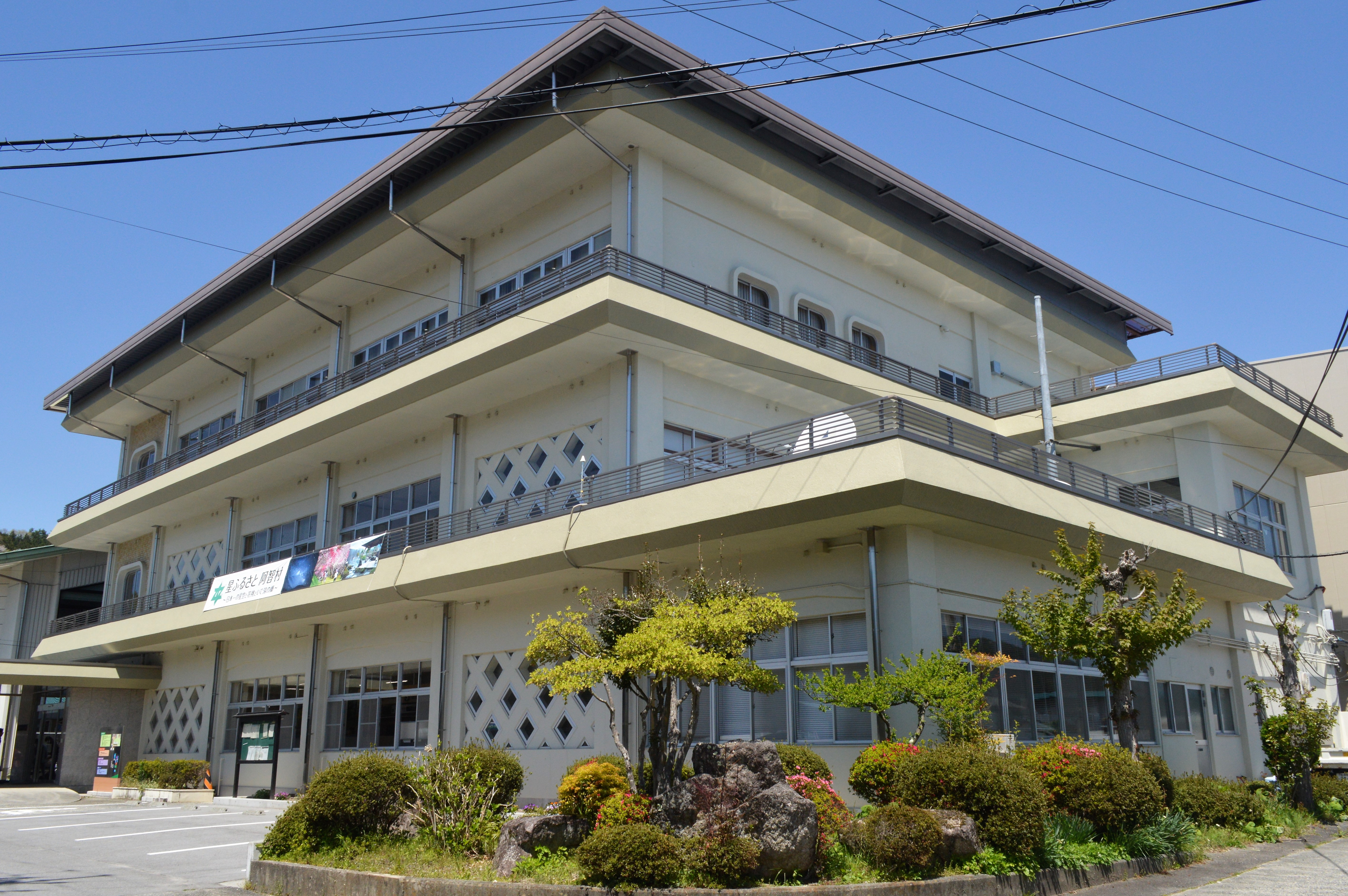
- Achi Village Hall

- Flag Seal

- Location of Achi in Nagano Prefecture

- Coordinates: 35°26′37.7″N 137°44′51.1″E
- Country: Japan
- Region: Chūbu (Kōshin'etsu)
- Prefecture: Nagano
- District: Shimoina

Area
  - Total: 214.43 km^{2} (82.79 sq mi)

Population (April 2019)
  - Total: 6,379
  - Density: 29.75/km^{2} (77.05/sq mi)
- Time zone: UTC+9 (Japan Standard Time)
- Phone number: 0265-43-2220
- Address: 483 Komaba, Achi-mura, Shimoina-gun, Nagano-ken 395-0303
- Climate: Dfb
- Website: Official website
- Symbols
- Flower: Adonis amurensis
- Tree: Aesculus turbinata

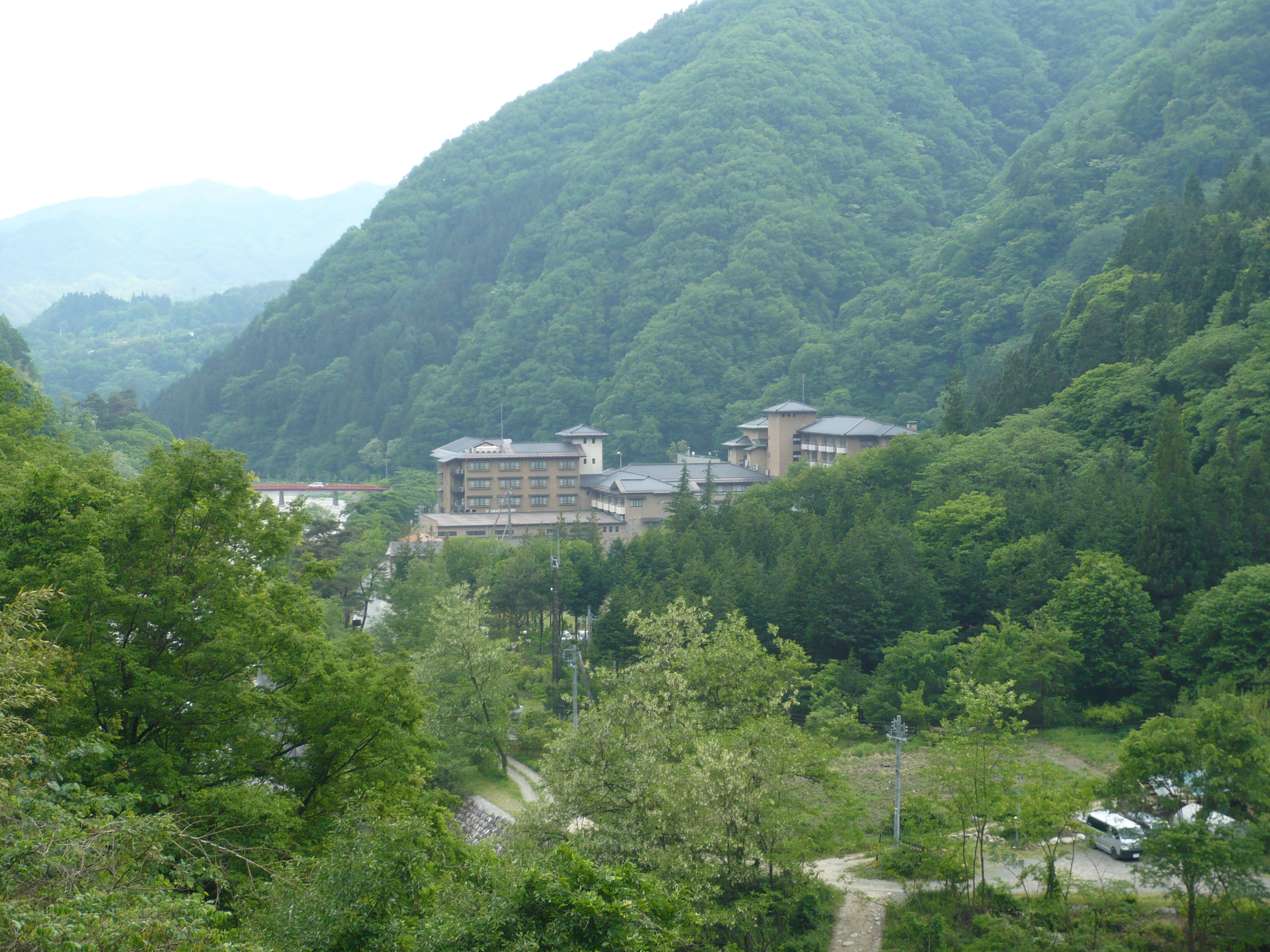
Hirugami Onsen in Achi

Achi (阿智村, Achi-mura) is a village located in Nagano Prefecture, Japan. As of 1 April 2019, the village had an estimated population of 6,379 in 2360 households, and a population density of 30.7 persons per km^{2}. The total area of the village is 214.43 square kilometres (82.79 sq mi).

== Geography ==
Achi is located in mountainous far southwestern Nagano Prefecture, bordered by Gifu Prefecture to the west. Mount Ena (2191 meters) is on the border of the village with Gifu Prefecture.

=== Surrounding municipalities ===
- Nagano Prefecture
  - Iida
  - Nagiso
  - Anan
  - Hiraya
  - Shimojō
- Gifu Prefecture
  - Nakatsugawa

=== Climate ===
The town has a climate characterized by hot and humid summers, and cold winters (Köppen climate classification Dfb). The average annual temperature in Achi is 9.5 °C (49.1 °F). The average annual rainfall is 2,644.2 mm (104.10 in) with July as the wettest month. The temperatures are highest on average in August, at around 21.2 °C (70.2 °F), and lowest in January, at around −2.3 °C (27.9 °F).

Climate data for Namiai, Achi (1991−2020 normals, extremes 1978−present)
Month	Jan	Feb	Mar	Apr	May	Jun	Jul	Aug	Sep	Oct	Nov	Dec	Year
Record high °C (°F)	12.9 (55.2)	16.4 (61.5)	22.5 (72.5)	25.9 (78.6)	30.4 (86.7)	30.7 (87.3)	34.5 (94.1)	33.5 (92.3)	32.4 (90.3)	27.2 (81.0)	22.0 (71.6)	18.9 (66.0)	34.5 (94.1)
Mean daily maximum °C (°F)	3.1 (37.6)	4.5 (40.1)	8.9 (48.0)	14.9 (58.8)	19.9 (67.8)	22.7 (72.9)	26.3 (79.3)	27.7 (81.9)	23.6 (74.5)	17.9 (64.2)	12.4 (54.3)	6.0 (42.8)	15.7 (60.2)
Daily mean °C (°F)	−2.3 (27.9)	−1.4 (29.5)	2.6 (36.7)	8.1 (46.6)	13.0 (55.4)	16.7 (62.1)	20.5 (68.9)	21.2 (70.2)	17.5 (63.5)	11.5 (52.7)	5.8 (42.4)	0.4 (32.7)	9.5 (49.1)
Mean daily minimum °C (°F)	−7.5 (18.5)	−7.0 (19.4)	−3.0 (26.6)	1.8 (35.2)	6.7 (44.1)	11.8 (53.2)	16.0 (60.8)	16.7 (62.1)	13.0 (55.4)	6.7 (44.1)	0.6 (33.1)	−4.3 (24.3)	4.3 (39.7)
Record low °C (°F)	−17.4 (0.7)	−16.3 (2.7)	−14.5 (5.9)	−7.8 (18.0)	−2.2 (28.0)	3.5 (38.3)	8.6 (47.5)	9.2 (48.6)	2.1 (35.8)	−3.3 (26.1)	−7.5 (18.5)	−14.0 (6.8)	−17.4 (0.7)
Average precipitation mm (inches)	108.0 (4.25)	135.2 (5.32)	220.2 (8.67)	223.3 (8.79)	240.5 (9.47)	311.4 (12.26)	361.3 (14.22)	220.9 (8.70)	322.9 (12.71)	240.5 (9.47)	145.1 (5.71)	114.9 (4.52)	2,644.2 (104.10)
Average precipitation days (≥ 1.0 mm)	10.3	8.6	12.1	11.4	11.7	14.3	15.4	11.9	12.3	11.2	9.4	10.6	139.2
Mean monthly sunshine hours	150.7	159.4	179.2	189.1	201.1	138.2	150.1	177.5	135.4	147.9	146.1	134.5	1,908.8
Source: Japan Meteorological Agency

== Demographics ==
Per Japanese census data, the population of Achi has decreased over the past 70 years.

Historical population
Year	Pop.	±%
1940	11,462	—
1950	12,662	+10.5%
1960	10,515	−17.0%
1970	8,329	−20.8%
1980	7,818	−6.1%
1990	7,807	−0.1%
2000	7,757	−0.6%
2010	7,035	−9.3%
2020	6,068	−13.7%

== History ==
The area of present-day Achi was part of ancient Shinano Province. The modern villages of Ochi, Chiri and Goka were established on April 1, 1889, by the establishment of the municipalities system. The three villages merged on September 30, 1956, to form the village of Achi. The neighboring village of Namiai was annexed on January 1, 2006.

On March 31, 2009, the village of Seinaiji, also in Shimoina District, was merged into Achi.

== Economy ==
The economy of Achi is based on agriculture, with Jerusalem artichoke, garlic and Yacón as noted local specialties.

== Education ==
Achi has five public elementary schools and one public middle school operated by the village government and one private elementary school. The village has one public high school, which is operated by the Nagano Prefectural Board of Education.

== Transportation ==
=== Railway ===
- The village has no passenger railway service.

=== Highway ===
- Chūō Expressway
- National Route 153
- National Route 256

== Local attractions ==
- Misaka Pass, a National Historic Site

== Notable people from Achi ==
- Motoichi Kumagai, photographer
- Taro Achi, screenwriter, novelist
