= Yasuoka Dam =

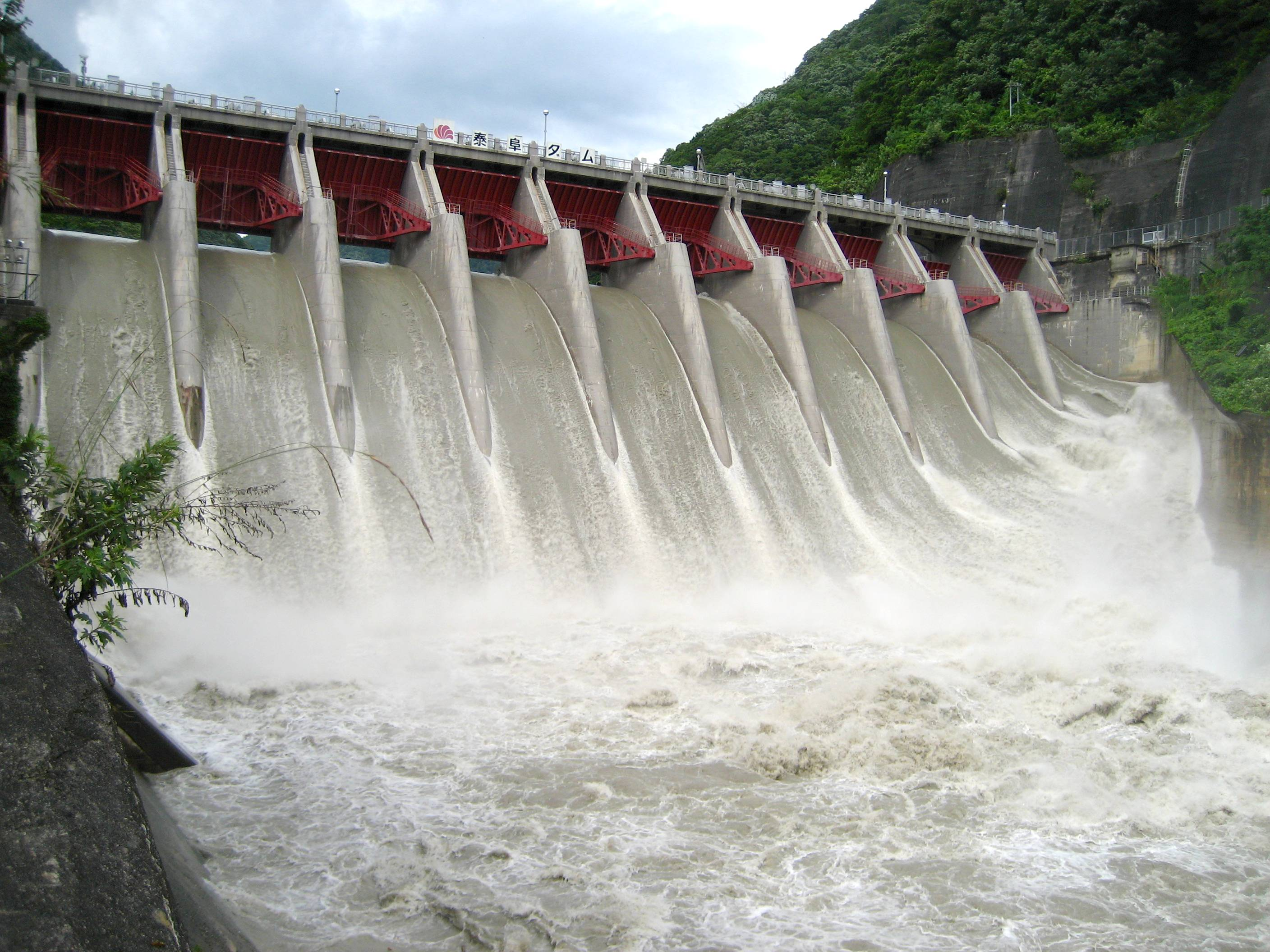
- Interactive map of Yasuoka Dam
- Location: Nagano Prefecture, Japan
- Coordinates: 35°22′49″N 137°48′38″E

Yasuoka Dam (Japanese: 泰阜ダム) is a dam in the Nagano Prefecture, Japan, completed in 1935.

There have been rumours and talks to demolish the dam, but these have not been confirmed.
