= Shimoina District, Nagano =

District in Nagano prefecture, Japan

Coordinates: 35.432°N 137.74°E

Shimoina (下伊那郡, Shimoina-gun) is a district located in southern Nagano Prefecture, Japan.

== Population ==
As of May 2008, the district has an estimated population of 65,359 with a density of 51.4 persons per km^{2}. The total area is 1,270.43 km^{2}.

== Municipalities ==
The district consists of three towns and ten villages:

- Anan (Note: Classified as a town.)
- Achi (Note: Classified as a village.)
- Hiraya
- Matsukawa
- Neba
- Ōshika
- Shimojō
- Takagi
- Takamori
- Tenryū
- Toyooka
- Urugi
- Yasuoka

== History ==
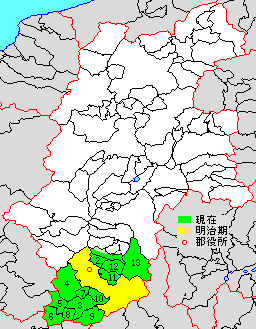
Map showing original extent of Shimoina District in Nagano Prefecture: * yellow - areas formerly within the district borders during the early Meiji period: 1. Matsukawa-machi; 2. Takamori-machi; 3. Anan-machi; 4. Achi-mura; 5. Hiraya-mura; 6. Neba-mura; 7. Shimojō-mura; 8. Urugi-mura; 9. Tenryū-mura; 10. Yasuoka-mura; 11. Takagi-mura; 12. Toyooka-mura; 13. Ōshika-mura

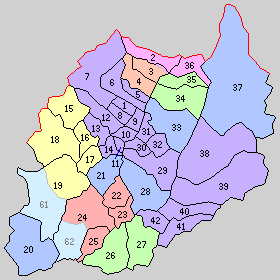
Colored areas are in this district.

- January 4, 1879 - Ina District was split off into Kamiina and Shimoina Districts during the early Meiji period establishment of the municipalities system, which initially consisted of 1 town and 31 villages. Its district headquarters was located at the village of Iida.

=== District Timeline ===
- July 1, 1993 - The town of Kamisato was merged into the expanded city of Iida.

=== Recent mergers ===
- October 1, 2005: The villages of Kami and Minamishinano were merged into the expanded city of Iida.
- January 1, 2006: The village of Namiai was merged into the expanded village of Achi.
- March 31, 2009: The village of Seinaiji was merged into the expanded village of Achi.
