= Ina-Yawata Station =

Railway station in Iida, Nagano Prefecture, Japan

Ina-Yawata Station 伊那八幡駅
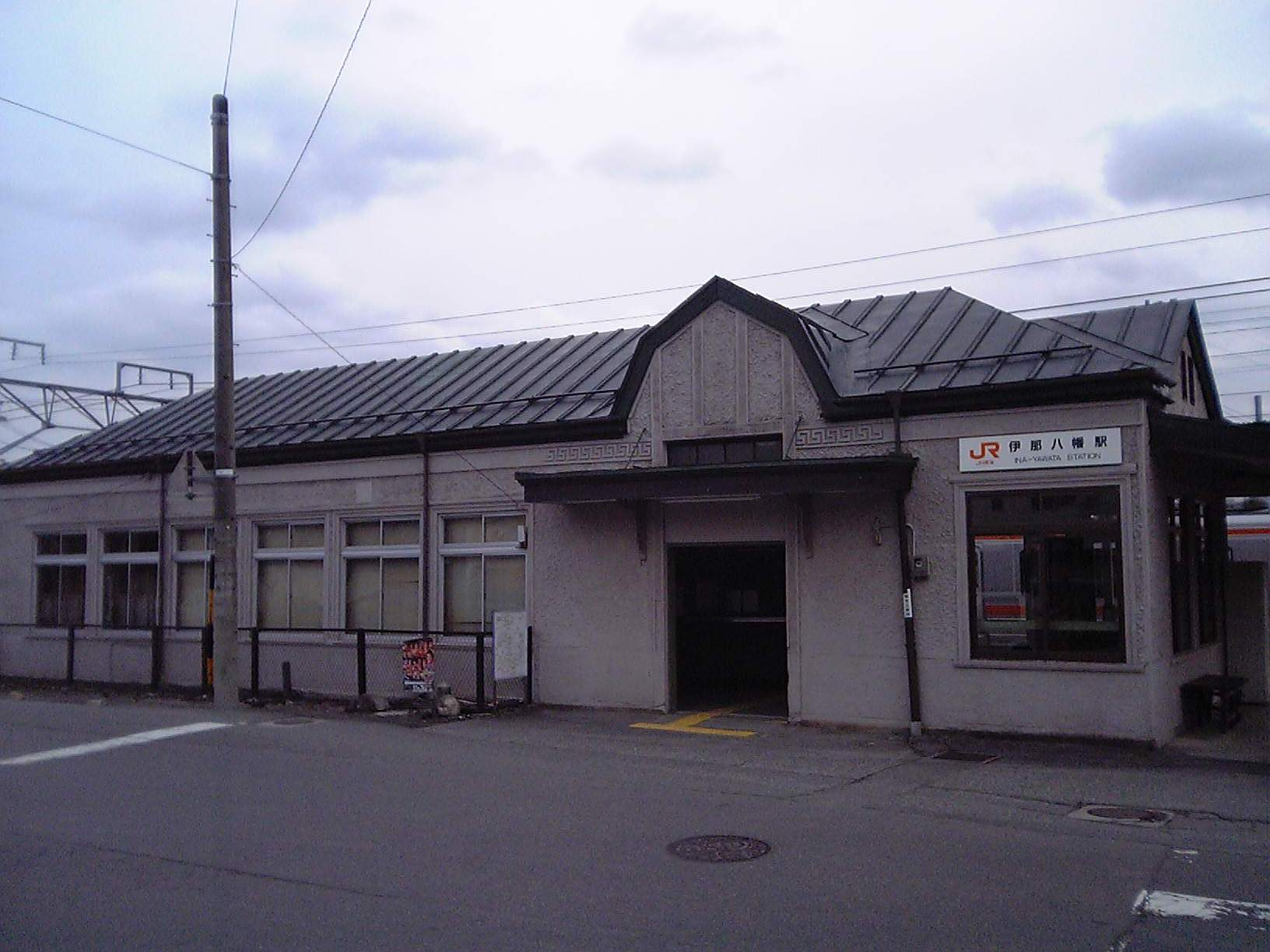
- Ina-Yawata Station, December 2009

General information
- Location: 2191 Yawata, Iida-shi, Nagano-ken 395-0814; Japan
- Coordinates: 35.4968°N 137.8409°E
- Elevation: 414 meters
- Operator: JR Central
- Line: Iida Line
- Distance: 123.6 km from Toyohashi
- Platforms: 2 side platforms

Other information
- Status: Unstaffed

History
- Opened: 17 December 1926

Passengers
- FY2015: 234 (daily)
Location
- Location within Nagano Prefecture Location within Japan

Ina-Yawata Station (伊那八幡駅, Ina-Yawata-eki) is a railway station on the Iida Line in the city of Iida, Nagano Prefecture, Japan, operated by Central Japan Railway Company (JR Central).

== Lines ==
Ina-Yawata Station is served by the Iida Line and is 123.6 kilometers from the starting point of the line at Toyohashi Station.

== Station layout ==
The station consists of two ground-level opposed side platforms connected by a level crossing. The station is unattended.

=== Platforms ===
| 1 | ■ Iida Line | for Iida and Tatsuno |
| 2 | ■ Iida Line | for Iida and Tatsuno for Chūbu-Tenryū and Toyohashi |

== Adjacent stations ==
| « | Service | » |
Iida Line
Limited Express Inaji: Does not stop at this station
| Kega | Local | Shimoyamamura |

== History ==
Ina-Yawata Station opened on 17 December 1926. With the privatization of Japanese National Railways (JNR) on 1 April 1987, the station came under the control of JR Central.

== Passenger statistics ==
In fiscal 2015, the station was used by an average of 223 passengers daily (boarding passengers only).

== Surrounding area ==
- Iida City Hospital
- National Route 151
- Iida Women's Junior College

== See also ==
- List of railway stations in Japan
