= Ichida =

Ichida (written: 市田 lit. "market field") is a Japanese surname. Notable people with the surname include:

- Soichi Ichida (1910–1986), Japanese philatelist
- Ichida Souta (市田 左右太) (1843–1896), Japanese photographer
- Tadayoshi Ichida (市田 忠義) (born 1942), Japanese politician

== See also ==
- Ichida Station (市田駅, Ichida-eki), train station in Takamori, Shimoina District, Nagano Prefecture, Japan
