= Tokimata Station =

Railway station in Iida, Nagano Prefecture, Japan

Tokimata Station 時又駅
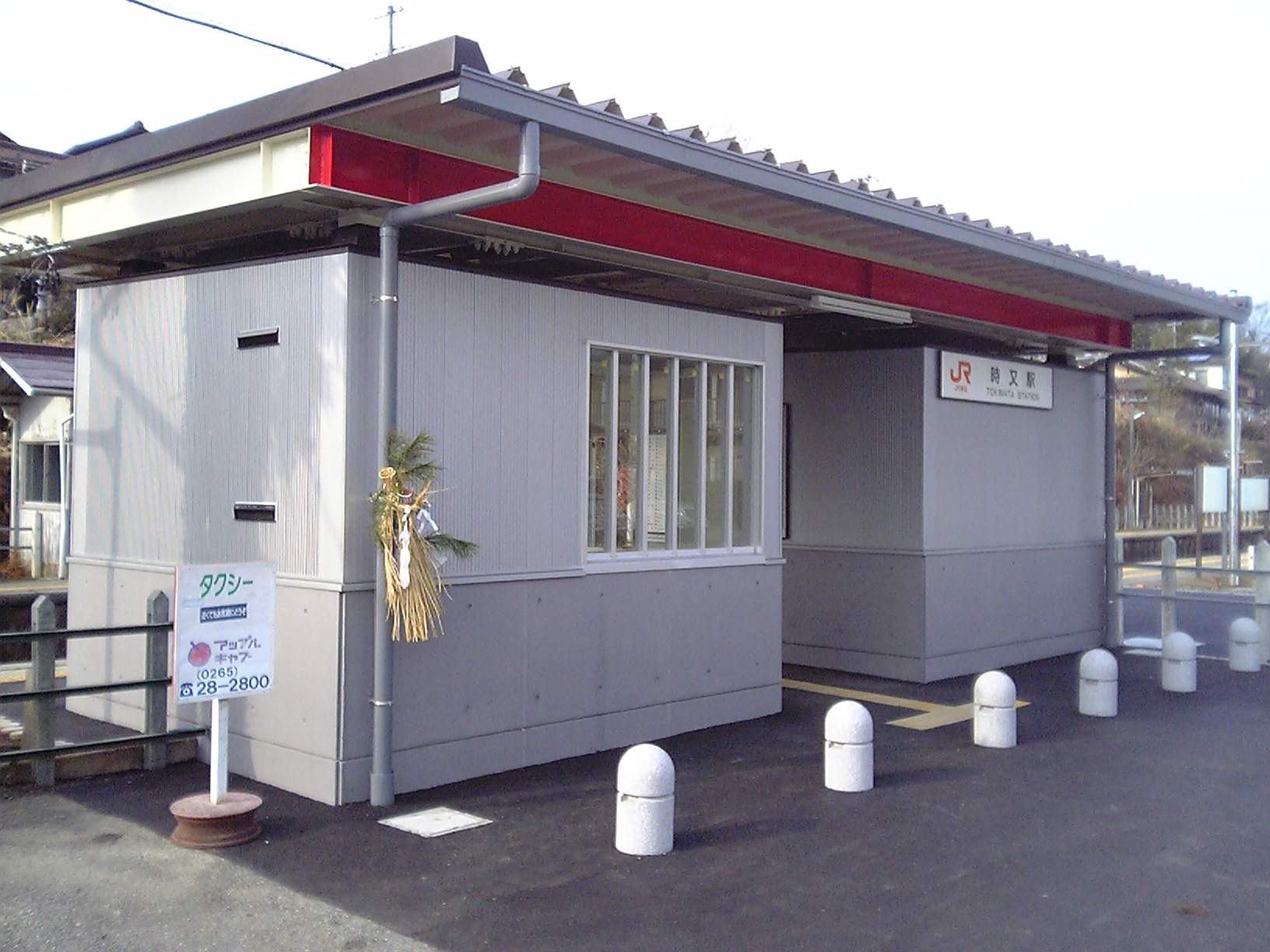
- Tokimata Station in December 2009

General information
- Location: 935 Tokimata, Iida-shi, Nagano-ken 399-2563; Japan
- Coordinates: 35.4639°N 137.8278°E
- Elevation: 383 meters
- Operator: JR Central
- Line: Iida Line
- Distance: 119.3 km from Toyohashi
- Platforms: 2 side platforms

Other information
- Status: Unstaffed

History
- Opened: 26 December 1927

Passengers
- FY2015: 117 daily
Location
- Location within Nagano Prefecture Location within Japan

Tokimata Station (時又駅, Tokimata-ek) is a railway station on the Iida Line in the city of Iida, Nagano Prefecture, Japan, operated by Central Japan Railway Company (JR Central).

== Lines ==
Tokimata Station is served by the Iida Line and is 119.3 kilometers from the starting point of the line at Toyohashi Station.

== Station layout ==
The station consists of a two opposed ground-level side platforms connected by a level crossing. The station is unattended.

=== Platforms ===
1	■ Iida Line	for Chūbu-Tenryū and Toyohashi
2	■ Iida Line	for Iida and Tatsuno

== Adjacent stations ==
«	Service	»
Iida Line
Limited Express Inaji: Does not stop at this station
Kawaji	Local	Dashina

== History ==
Tokimata Station opened on 26 December 1927. With the privatization of Japanese National Railways (JNR) on 1 April 1987, the station came under the control of JR Central.

== Passenger statistics ==
In fiscal 2015, the station was used by an average of 117 passengers daily (boarding passengers only).

== Surrounding area ==
- Tenryū River
- National Route 151

== See also ==
- List of railway stations in Japan
