= Dashina Station =

Railway station in Iida, Nagano Prefecture, Japan

Dashina Station 駄科駅
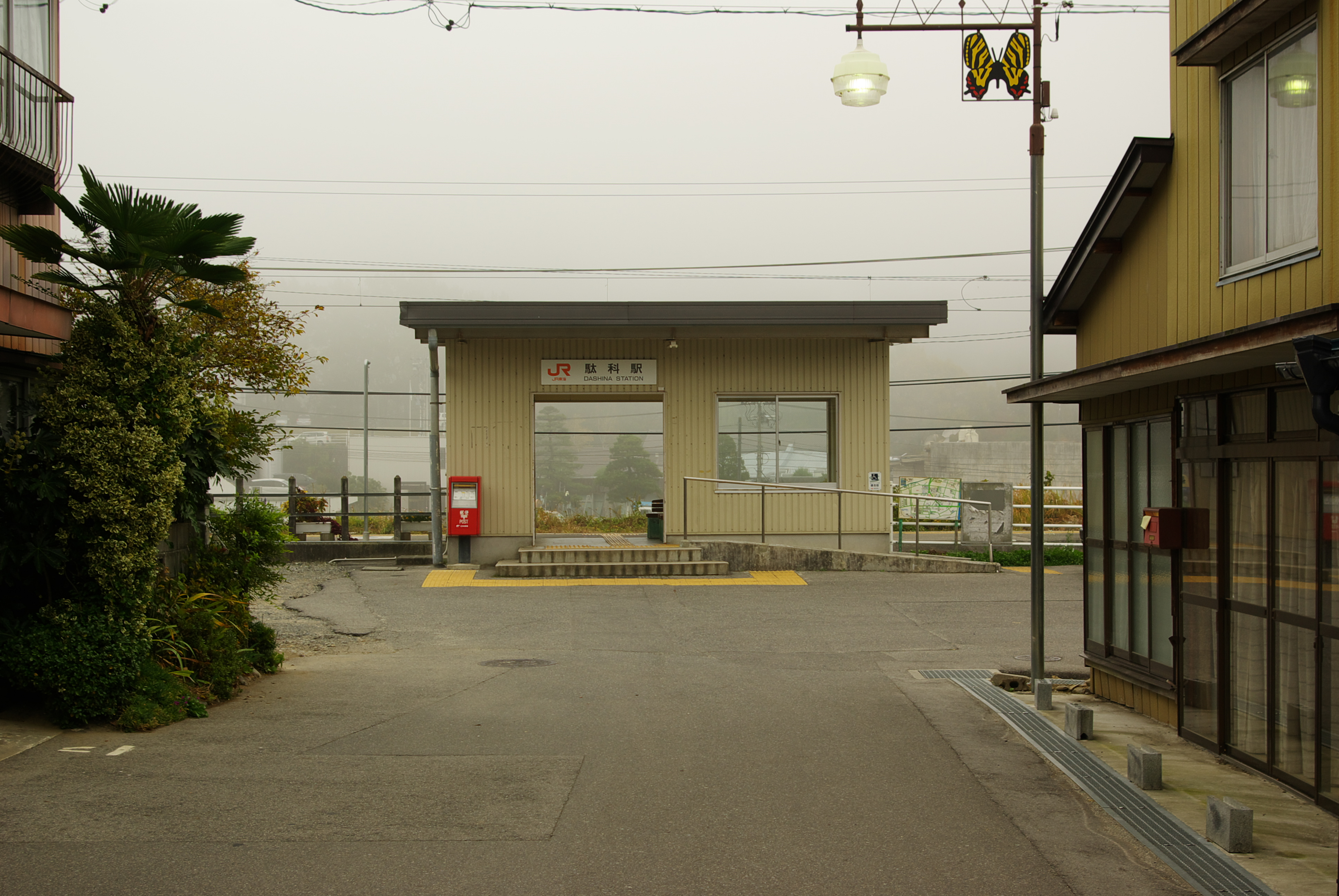
- Dashina Station in October 2009

General information
- Location: 867 Dashina-Shimohira, Iida-shi, Nagano-ken 399-2561; Japan
- Coordinates: 35.4755°N 137.8395°E
- Elevation: 411 meters
- Operator: JR Central
- Line: Iida Line
- Distance: 121.1 km from Toyohashi
- Platforms: 1 side platform

Other information
- Status: Unstaffed

History
- Opened: 8 April 1927

Passengers
- FY2013: 150 daily
Location
- Location within Nagano Prefecture Location within Japan

Dashina Station (駄科駅, Dashina-eki) is a railway station on the Iida Line in the city of Iida, Nagano Prefecture, Japan, operated by Central Japan Railway Company (JR Central).

== Lines ==
Dashina Station is served by the Iida Line and is 121.1 kilometers from the starting point of the line at Toyohashi Station.

== Station layout ==
The station consists of a single ground-level side platform serving one bi-directional track. There is no station building, but there is a shelter on the platform. The station is unattended.

== Adjacent stations ==
«	Service	»
Iida Line
Limited Express Inaji: Does not stop at this station
Tokimata	Local	Kega

== History ==
Dashina Station opened on 8 April 1927.The station building burned down on 23 May 1998 and was rebuilt the following year. With the privatization of Japanese National Railways (JNR) on 1 April 1987, the station came under the control of JR Central.

== Passenger statistics ==
In fiscal 2015, the station was used by an average of 150 passengers daily (boarding passengers only).

== Surrounding area ==
- Dashina Post Office
- National Route 151

== See also ==
- List of railway stations in Japan
