= Ejima Station =

Railway station in Toyokawa, Aichi Prefecture, Japan

Ejima Station 江島駅
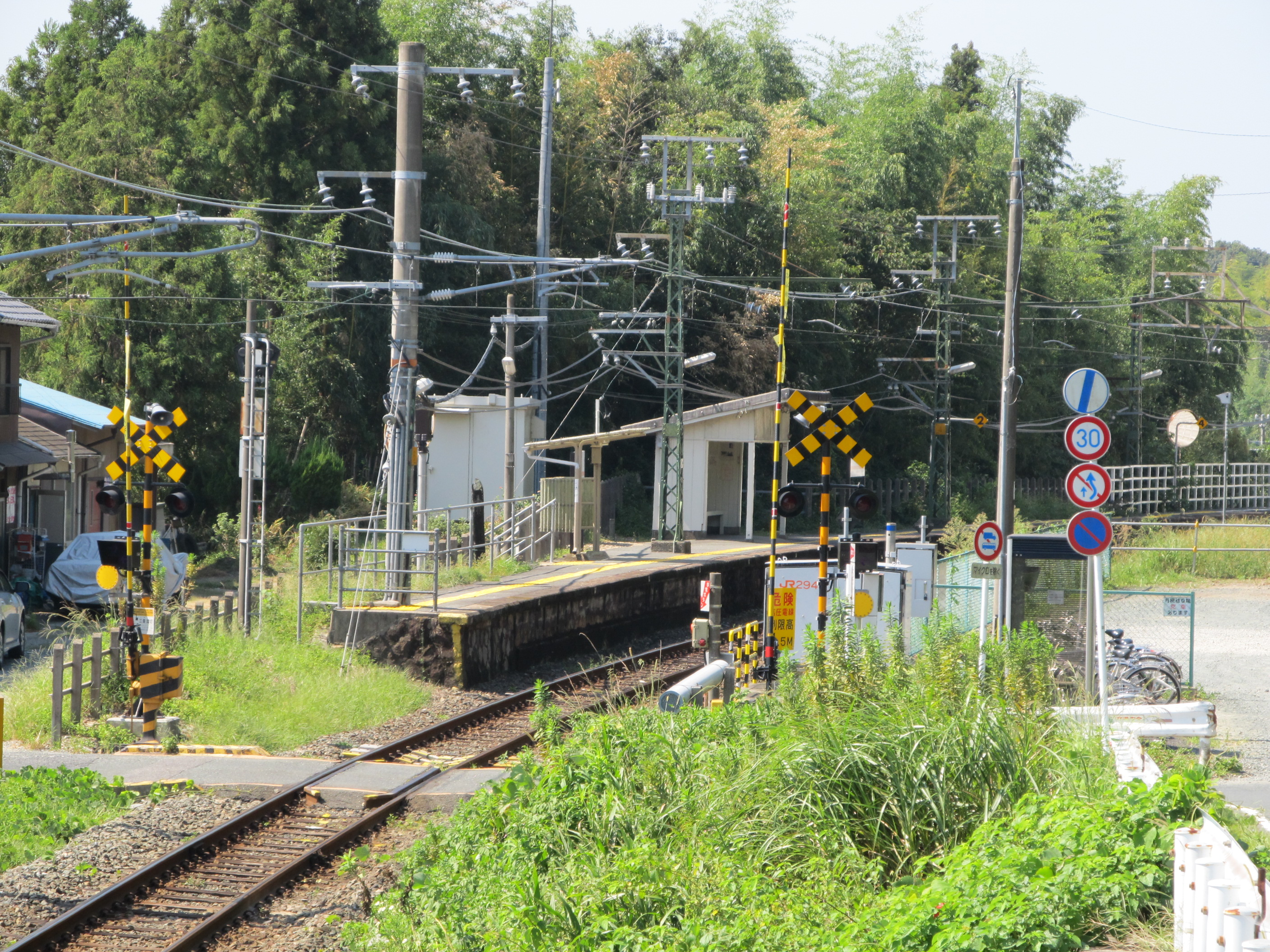
- Ejima Station, September 2011

General information
- Location: Maruzuka-58 Tōjōchō, Toyokawa-shi, Aichi-ken 441-1201; Japan
- Coordinates: 34.8680°N 137.4416°E
- Operator: JR Central
- Line: Iida Line
- Distance: 15.4 kilometers from Toyohashi
- Platforms: 1 side platform

Other information
- Status: Unstaffed

History
- Opened: August 1, 1943

Passengers
- FY2017: 66 daily
Location
- Location within Aichi Prefecture Location within Japan

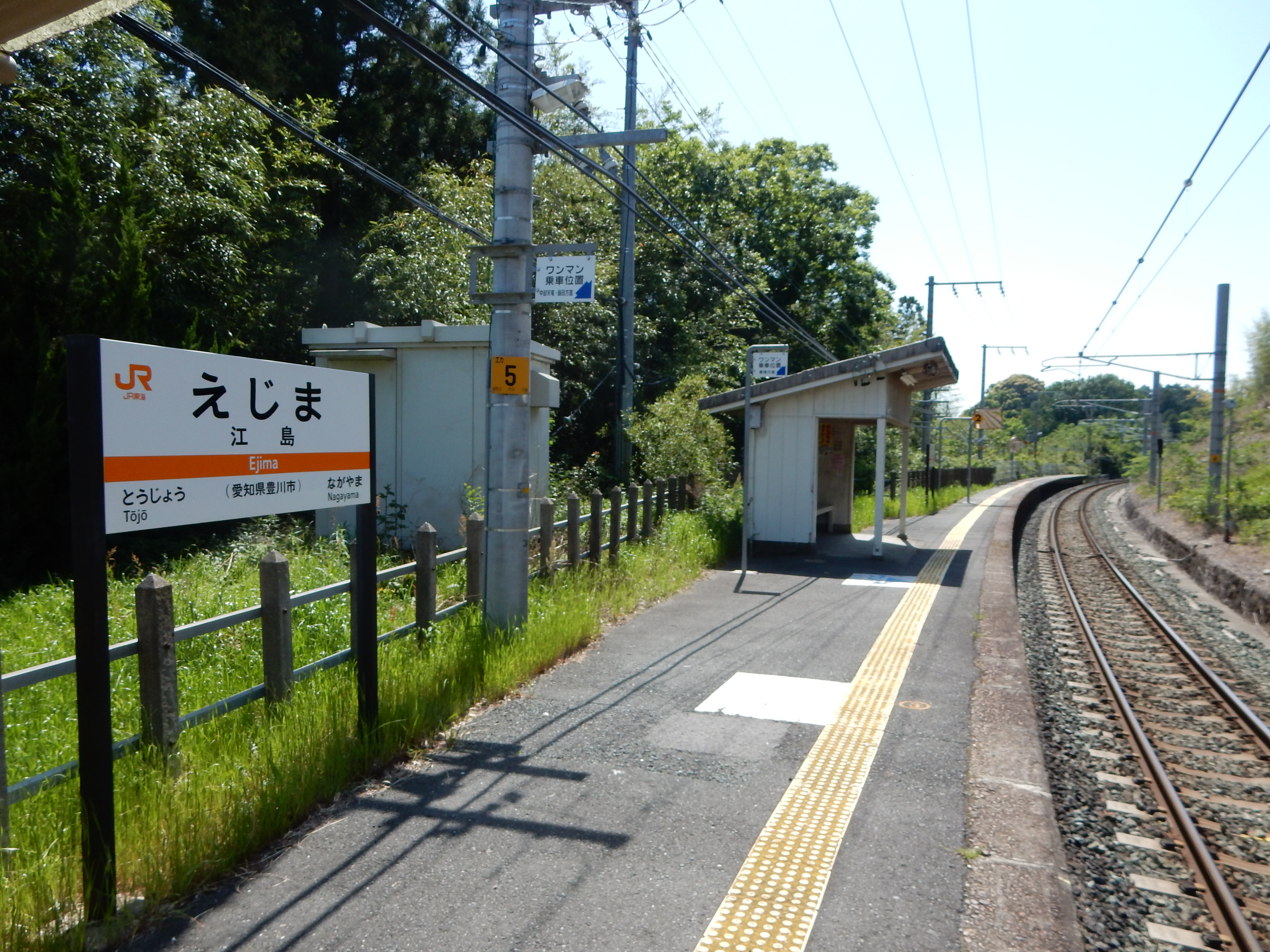
Platform

Ejima Station (江島駅, Ejima-eki) is a railway station in the city of Toyokawa, Aichi Prefecture, Japan, operated by Central Japan Railway Company (JR Tōkai).

== Lines ==
Ejima Station is served by the Iida Line, and is located 15.4 kilometers from the southern terminus of the line at Toyohashi Station.

== Station layout ==
The station has one side platform serving a single bi-directional track. The station building has automated ticket machines, TOICA automated turnstiles and is unattended.

== Adjacent stations ==
«	Service	»
Central Japan Railway Company
Iida Line
Limited Express "Inaji" (特急「伊那路」): Does not stop at this station
Nagayama	Local (普通)	Tōjō

== Station history ==
Ejima Station began operations on November 10, 1926 as the Ejima Signal Stop (江島渡停留場) on the now-defunct Toyokawa Railway (豊川鉄道, Toyokawa Tetsudō). On August 1, 1943, the Toyokawa Railway was nationalized along with some other local lines to form the Japanese Government Railways (JGR) Iida Line, and Ejima was raised in status to a full station. Along with its division and privatization of JNR on April 1, 1987, the station came under the control and operation of the Central Japan Railway Company (JR Tōkai).

== Passenger statistics ==
In fiscal 2017, the station was used by an average of 66 passengers daily.

== Surrounding area ==
- Japan National Route 151

== See also ==
- List of railway stations in Japan
