= Kega Station =

Railway station in Iida, Nagano Prefecture, Japan

Kega Station 毛賀駅
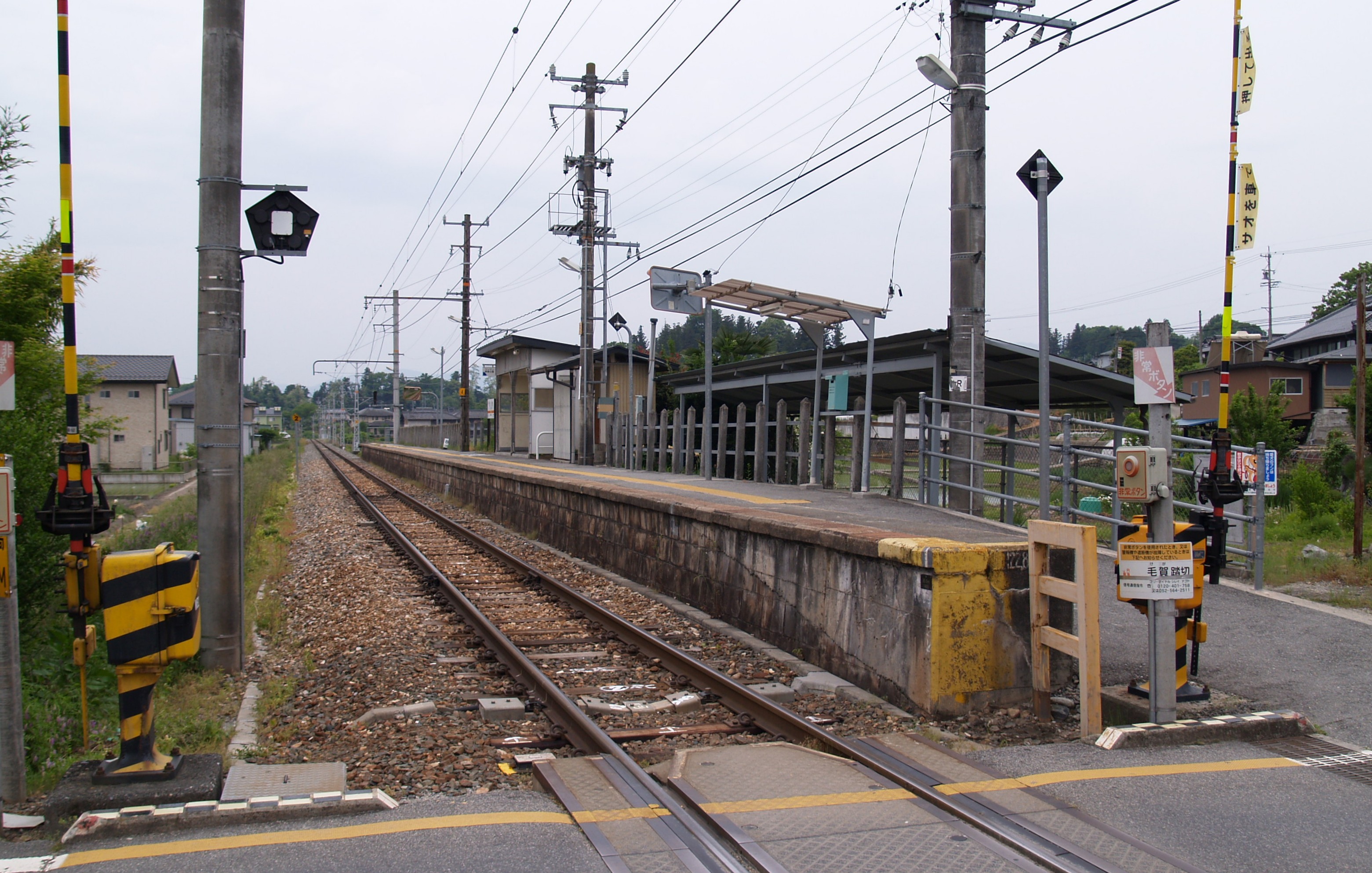
- Kega Station platform in May 2010

General information
- Location: 407 Kega, Iida-shi, Nagano-ken 395-0813; Japan
- Coordinates: 35.4873°N 137.8394°E
- Elevation: 403 meters
- Operator: JR Central
- Line: Iida Line
- Distance: 122.5 km from Toyohashi
- Platforms: 1 side platform

Other information
- Status: Unstaffed

History
- Opened: 5 February 1927

Passengers
- FY2015: 95 daily
Location
- Location within Nagano Prefecture Location within Japan

Kega Station (毛賀駅, Kega-eki) is a railway station on the Iida Line in Iida, Nagano Prefecture, Japan, operated by Central Japan Railway Company (JR Central).

== Lines ==
Kega Station is served by the Iida Line and is 122.5 kilometers from the starting point of the line at Toyohashi Station.

== Station layout ==
The station consists of a single ground-level side platform serving one bi-directional track. There is no station building, but only a platform built on the platform. The station is unattended.

== Adjacent stations ==
«	Service	»
Iida Line
Limited Express Inaji: Does not stop at this station
Dashina	Local	Ina-Yawata

== History ==
Kega Station opened on 5 February 1927. With the privatization of Japanese National Railways (JNR) on 1 April 1987, the station came under the control of JR Central.

== Passenger statistics ==
In fiscal 2015, the station was used by an average of 95 passengers daily (boarding passengers only).

== Surrounding area ==
- National Route 151
- Midorigaoka Junior High School

== See also ==
- List of railway stations in Japan
