= Kawaji =

Kawaji (written: 川路) is a Japanese surname. Notable people with the surname include:

- Kawaji Toshiyoshi (川路 利良, c. 1829 – 1879), Japanese politician
- Ryuko Kawaji (川路 柳虹, 1888–1959), pen name of Kawaki Makoto, Japanese poet and literary critic

== See also ==
- Kawaji Station, a railway station in Iida, Nagano Prefecture, Japan
