= Iida, Nagano =

Iida 飯田市
- City
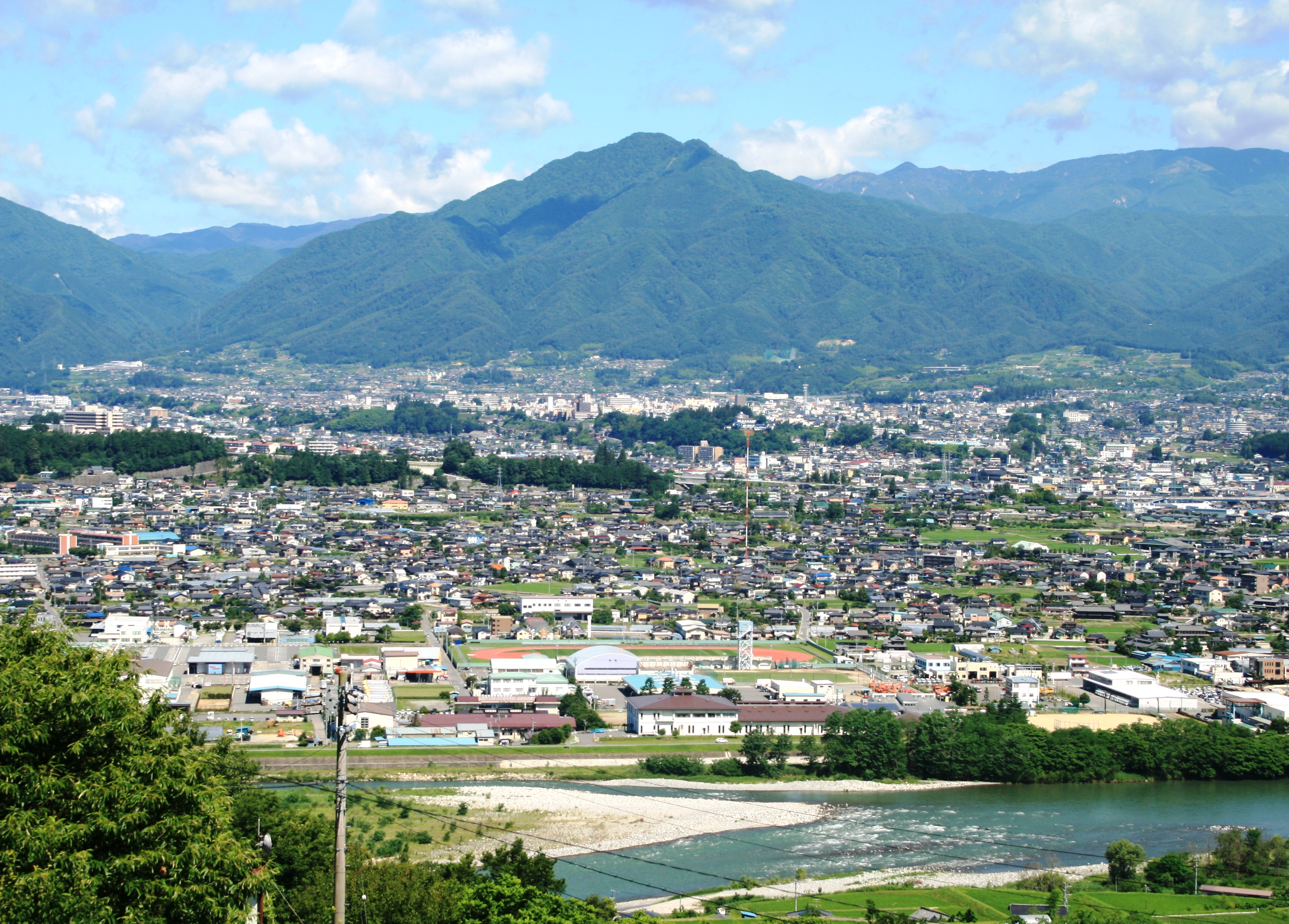
- Overview of Iida City

- Flag Seal
- Interactive map of Iida
- Coordinates: 35°30′54″N 137°49′17″E
- Country: Japan
- Region: Chūbu (Kōshin'etsu)
- Prefecture: Nagano

Government
  - Mayor: Takeshi Sato (since October 2020)

Area
  - Total: 658.66 km^{2} (254.31 sq mi)

Population (March 2019)
  - Total: 101,536
  - Density: 154.16/km^{2} (399.26/sq mi)
- Time zone: UTC+9 (Japan Standard Time)
- Phone number: 0265-22-4511
- Address: 2534 Okubo-chō, Iida-shi, Nagano-ken 395-8501
- Climate: Cfa
- Website: Official website
- Symbols
- Flower: Rhododendron dilataturn
- Tree: Apple

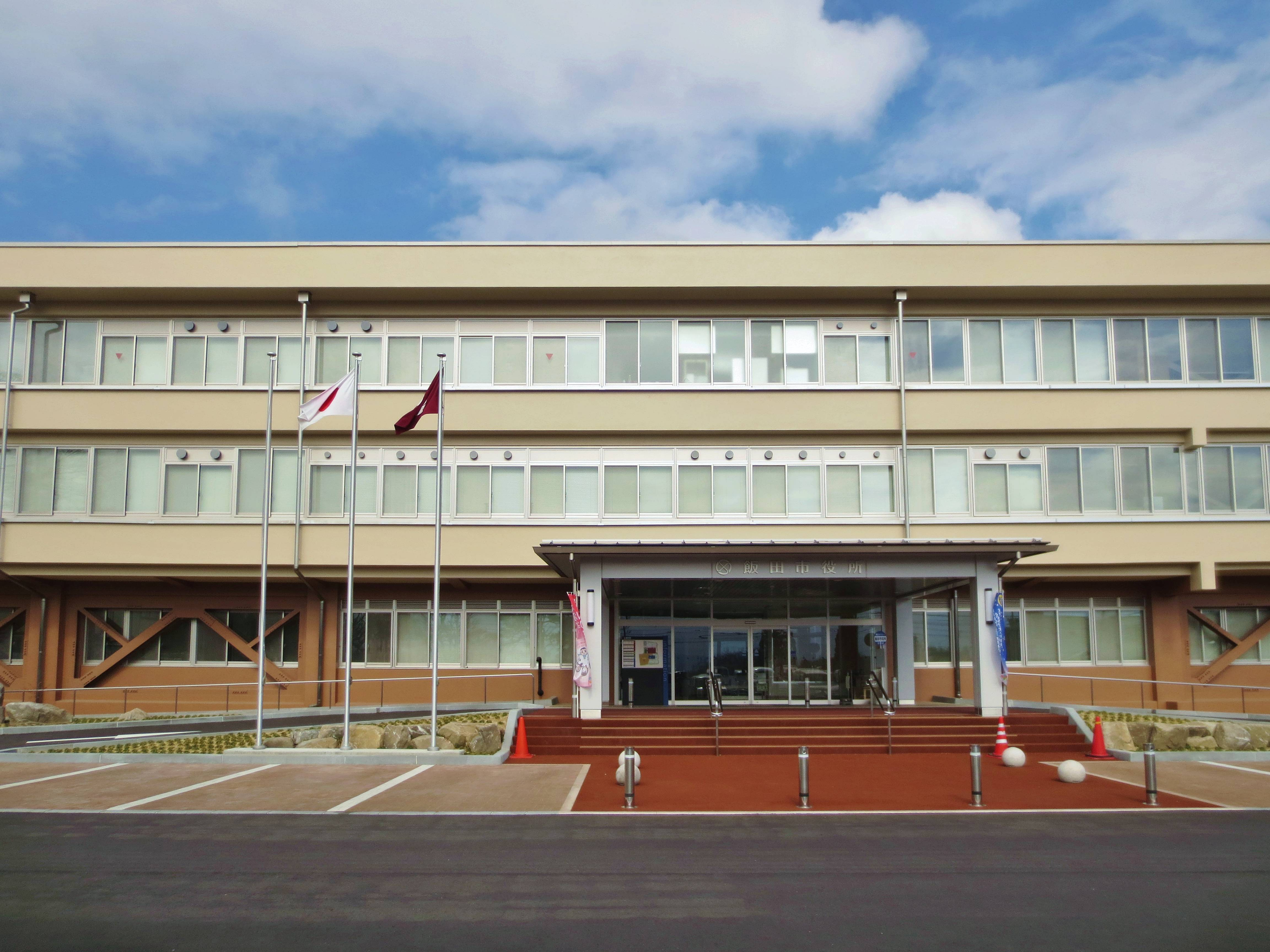
Iida City Office

Iida (飯田市, Iida-shi; Japanese pronunciation: [ìí.dä́(.ɕì), íí-]) is a city in Nagano Prefecture, Japan. As of 1 March 2019, Iida had an estimated population of 101,536, and a population density of 154 persons per km^{2}. The total area of the city is 658.66 square kilometres (254.31 sq mi). Iida is an environmental model city (環境モデル都市, Kankyō moderu toshi), a municipality designated by the Japanese government to be a model for making large cuts in greenhouse gas emissions towards a low-carbon society.

== Geography ==
Iida is the southernmost city of Nagano Prefecture. Mount Hijiri at 3,013 metres (9,885 ft) is the highest elevation in the city. Iida lies 90 minutes northeast of the major city of Nagoya by automobile via the Chūō Expressway. The same expressway also provides access to Tokyo, about four hours to the east. The nearest large metropolis to Iida is Nagoya, which is easily accessible by bus (about 2 hours). The larger cities of Matsumoto and Nagano in central and northern Nagano Prefecture are also accessible by bus and train. There is also a bus service to Shinjuku, Tokyo, which takes about four hours.

=== Surrounding municipalities ===
- Nagano Prefecture
  - Kamiina District: Iijima
  - Shimoina District: Matsukawa, Takamori, Achi, Shimojo, Yasuoka, Tenryū, Takagi, Toyooka, Ōshika
  - Kiso District: Nagiso, Ōkuwa
- Shizuoka Prefecture
  - Shizuoka: Aoi-ku
  - Hamamatsu
  - Haibara District: Kawanehon

== Climate ==
Iida has a humid subtropical climate (Köppen climate classification Cfa) with very warm summers and cold winters. The average annual temperature in Iida is 13.1 °C (55.6 °F). The average annual rainfall is 1,688.1 mm (66.46 in) with July as the wettest month. The temperatures are highest on average in August, at around 25.4 °C (77.7 °F), and lowest in January, at around 1.0 °C (33.8 °F).

Climate data for Iida (1991–2020 normals, extremes 1897–present)
Month	Jan	Feb	Mar	Apr	May	Jun	Jul	Aug	Sep	Oct	Nov	Dec	Year
Record high °C (°F)	19.7 (67.5)	21.1 (70.0)	26.2 (79.2)	31.4 (88.5)	33.8 (92.8)	36.4 (97.5)	38.4 (101.1)	37.7 (99.9)	36.1 (97.0)	31.0 (87.8)	26.1 (79.0)	20.9 (69.6)	38.4 (101.1)
Mean daily maximum °C (°F)	6.7 (44.1)	8.1 (46.6)	12.2 (54.0)	18.6 (65.5)	23.6 (74.5)	26.5 (79.7)	30.0 (86.0)	31.6 (88.9)	27.2 (81.0)	20.9 (69.6)	14.8 (58.6)	8.9 (48.0)	19.1 (66.4)
Daily mean °C (°F)	1.0 (33.8)	2.3 (36.1)	6.1 (43.0)	11.8 (53.2)	16.9 (62.4)	20.6 (69.1)	24.4 (75.9)	25.4 (77.7)	21.5 (70.7)	15.0 (59.0)	8.6 (47.5)	3.4 (38.1)	13.1 (55.6)
Mean daily minimum °C (°F)	−3.6 (25.5)	−2.7 (27.1)	0.6 (33.1)	5.9 (42.6)	11.1 (52.0)	16.0 (60.8)	20.3 (68.5)	20.9 (69.6)	17.3 (63.1)	10.7 (51.3)	3.9 (39.0)	−1.1 (30.0)	8.3 (46.9)
Record low °C (°F)	−16.5 (2.3)	−15.2 (4.6)	−11.9 (10.6)	−5.1 (22.8)	−0.9 (30.4)	3.9 (39.0)	10.1 (50.2)	10.9 (51.6)	4.6 (40.3)	−2.0 (28.4)	−7.5 (18.5)	−13.7 (7.3)	−16.5 (2.3)
Average precipitation mm (inches)	63.4 (2.50)	78.7 (3.10)	139.1 (5.48)	141.0 (5.55)	153.8 (6.06)	192.0 (7.56)	240.1 (9.45)	149.4 (5.88)	208.6 (8.21)	163.3 (6.43)	93.4 (3.68)	65.4 (2.57)	1,688.1 (66.46)
Average snowfall cm (inches)	25 (9.8)	22 (8.7)	4 (1.6)	0 (0)	0 (0)	0 (0)	0 (0)	0 (0)	0 (0)	0 (0)	1 (0.4)	9 (3.5)	61 (24)
Average precipitation days (≥ 0.5 mm)	8.5	7.8	11.5	10.8	11.2	13.6	14.5	11.5	11.5	10.8	8.7	9.3	129.6
Average snowy days	14.6	10.9	6.9	1.6	0.0	0.0	0.0	0.0	0.0	0.0	1.8	10.8	48.8
Average relative humidity (%)	66	63	61	62	66	72	75	74	75	76	74	71	70
Mean monthly sunshine hours	180.5	172.0	187.9	193.5	204.5	155.7	166.2	195.2	154.6	154.0	149.9	160.7	2,074.5
Source: Japan Meteorological Agency (1991–2020 normals, extremes 1897–present)

Climate data for Minamishinano, Iida (1991–2020 normals, extremes 1978–present)
Month	Jan	Feb	Mar	Apr	May	Jun	Jul	Aug	Sep	Oct	Nov	Dec	Year
Record high °C (°F)	17.2 (63.0)	21.8 (71.2)	26.9 (80.4)	31.0 (87.8)	34.5 (94.1)	37.9 (100.2)	39.5 (103.1)	39.5 (103.1)	36.3 (97.3)	32.3 (90.1)	24.7 (76.5)	22.0 (71.6)	39.5 (103.1)
Mean daily maximum °C (°F)	7.5 (45.5)	9.3 (48.7)	13.5 (56.3)	19.4 (66.9)	24.2 (75.6)	26.7 (80.1)	30.3 (86.5)	32.0 (89.6)	27.7 (81.9)	21.6 (70.9)	15.5 (59.9)	9.8 (49.6)	19.8 (67.6)
Daily mean °C (°F)	1.2 (34.2)	2.4 (36.3)	6.3 (43.3)	11.9 (53.4)	16.9 (62.4)	20.5 (68.9)	24.0 (75.2)	25.1 (77.2)	21.3 (70.3)	15.1 (59.2)	8.7 (47.7)	3.4 (38.1)	13.1 (55.6)
Mean daily minimum °C (°F)	−3.3 (26.1)	−2.7 (27.1)	0.6 (33.1)	5.6 (42.1)	11.0 (51.8)	15.9 (60.6)	19.7 (67.5)	20.6 (69.1)	17.1 (62.8)	10.9 (51.6)	4.1 (39.4)	−1.0 (30.2)	8.2 (46.8)
Record low °C (°F)	−12.1 (10.2)	−12.0 (10.4)	−7.9 (17.8)	−3.8 (25.2)	1.2 (34.2)	7.8 (46.0)	12.9 (55.2)	12.8 (55.0)	7.2 (45.0)	−0.8 (30.6)	−4.3 (24.3)	−8.9 (16.0)	−12.1 (10.2)
Average precipitation mm (inches)	65.2 (2.57)	82.6 (3.25)	144.4 (5.69)	145.0 (5.71)	164.8 (6.49)	220.1 (8.67)	290.2 (11.43)	169.8 (6.69)	242.2 (9.54)	198.8 (7.83)	101.0 (3.98)	71.4 (2.81)	1,895.5 (74.63)
Average precipitation days (≥ 1.0 mm)	7.1	7.2	10.4	10.5	10.7	12.8	13.6	11.0	11.4	10.6	7.6	7.3	120.0
Mean monthly sunshine hours	154.0	156.0	178.8	196.7	212.1	156.9	176.2	211.0	164.3	155.0	144.5	148.2	2,057.3
Source: Japan Meteorological Agency (1991–2020 normals, extremes 1978–present)

== Demographics ==
Per Japanese census data, the population Iida remained relatively constant from 1960 until 2010 but has decreased slightly in recent years.

Historical population
Year	Pop.	±%
1940	96,834	—
1950	114,140	+17.9%
1960	107,902	−5.5%
1970	104,789	−2.9%
1980	109,465	+4.5%
1990	110,402	+0.9%
2000	110,589	+0.2%
2010	105,364	−4.7%
2020	98,164	−6.8%

As of 2001, 1,700 people, 1.5% of the city's population, were Brazilians.

== History ==
The area of present-day Iida was part of ancient Shinano Province. The area was part of the holdings of Iida Domain during the Edo period and developed as a jōkamachi surrounding Iida Castle. The town of Iida was created within Shimoina District with the establishment of the municipalities system on April 1, 1889. It was raised to city status on April 1, 1937. Iida escaped the bombings that damaged many other Japanese cities during World War II; however, most of central Iida was destroyed by a massive fire that swept through the central section of the city two years after the end of the war, in 1947.

On September 30, 1956 the city limits were expanded by annexing the neighboring villages of Zakoji, Matsuo, Tatsuoka, Miho, Igara, Yamamoto and Shimohizakata, followed by Kawaji on March 31, 1961, Chiyo, Tatsue, and Kamihizakata on March 31, 1964, the town of Kanae on December 1, 1984, Kamisato on July 1, 1993, and Kami and Minamishinano on October 1, 2005.

On February 5, 2013, Iida became one of the few Japanese cities to have a roundabout.

== Government ==
Iida has a mayor-council form of government with a directly elected mayor and a unicameral city legislature of 23 members.

== Economy ==
Iida was traditionally known for sericulture and the production of mizuhiki, a traditional art form using knotted cords. In the modern era, the economy of Iida centers on horticulture, notably pears and apples, and the production of precision instruments and electronics.

== Education ==
=== University ===
- Iida Women's Junior College

=== Primary and secondary education ===
Iida has 19 public elementary schools and ten public middle schools. There are four public high schools operated by the Nagano Prefectural Board of Education and one private high school.

== Transportation ==
=== Railway ===
- JR Tōkai - Iida Line
  - Kinno - Chiyo - Tenryūkyō - Kawaji - Tokimata - Dashina - Kega - Ina-Yawata - Shimoyamamura - Kanae - Kiriishi - Iida - Sakuramachi - Ina-Kamisato - Motozenkōji

=== Highway ===
- Chūō Expressway
- National Route 151
- National Route 152
- National Route 153
- National Route 256
- National Route 418
- National Route 474

== Sister city relations ==
=== Overseas ===
- - Charleville-Mézières, France

=== Within Japan ===
- (Japan) - Tsuyama, Okayama Prefecture
- (Japan) - Ise, Mie Prefecture

== Local attractions ==
- Gonga Administrative Complex ruins, a Nara-Heian period National Historic Site
- Iida Kofun group, Kofun-period burial tumuli cluster, a National Historic Site
- Tenryū-kyō, Nationally designated place of Scenic Beauty
- Tenryū-Okumikawa Quasi-National Park

== Culture ==
Since 1979 the city of Iida has hosted the Iida Puppetry Festival, a major event that is the largest of its kind in Japan, with over 200 traditional and contemporary troupes from all over Japan and abroad participating in the annual four-day festival in early August. In 2008 the city hosted a nine-day version of the festival with expanded international participation to celebrate the 30th anniversary of the puppetry festival. Iida's connection to the traditional Japanese puppet theater commonly known as ningyō jōruri or Bunraku goes back more than 300 years. Four traditional puppet troupes are located in or near Iida: the Imada Puppet Troupe, Kuroda Puppet Troupe, the Furuta Puppets, and the Waseda Puppets.

In June, the "Saiwai Shimoina Wadaiko Festival", a major taiko drum festival takes place in Iida. Each year, top drum groups perform at the "Super Show" while amateur groups perform at the "Fringe Festival."

Beginning in July, there are many festivals at local shrines. One aspect of these festivals that surprises visitors is the quantity of fireworks. One of the biggest and most spectacular displays of fireworks is the Tōrō-nagashi festival, in Tokimata, held around the 16th of August. The fireworks are also shot off on the surface of the Tenryū River. Another important festival in Iida is Oneri Matsuri, which is held every seventh year (the last being 2016, the next in March, 2022), a massive four-day event, most famous for the shi-shi lion dance.

Iida has adopted the apple as its symbol. One of the city's largest festivals is the Ringo Matsuri (Apple Festival), held every year in early August, and Iida's Ringo Namiki-dori (a street lined with apple trees) is tended by students of the city's Higashi Middle School. The area around Iida is well known for extensive peach, apple, and persimmon orchards, as well as the production of many other agricultural products, including Asian pears (nashi) and strawberries. A local specialty is hoshi-gaki, or dried persimmons.

Iida is also known for the production of mizuhiki.
