= Nagayama Station (Aichi) =

Railway station in Toyokawa, Aichi Prefecture, Japan

Nagayama Station 長山駅
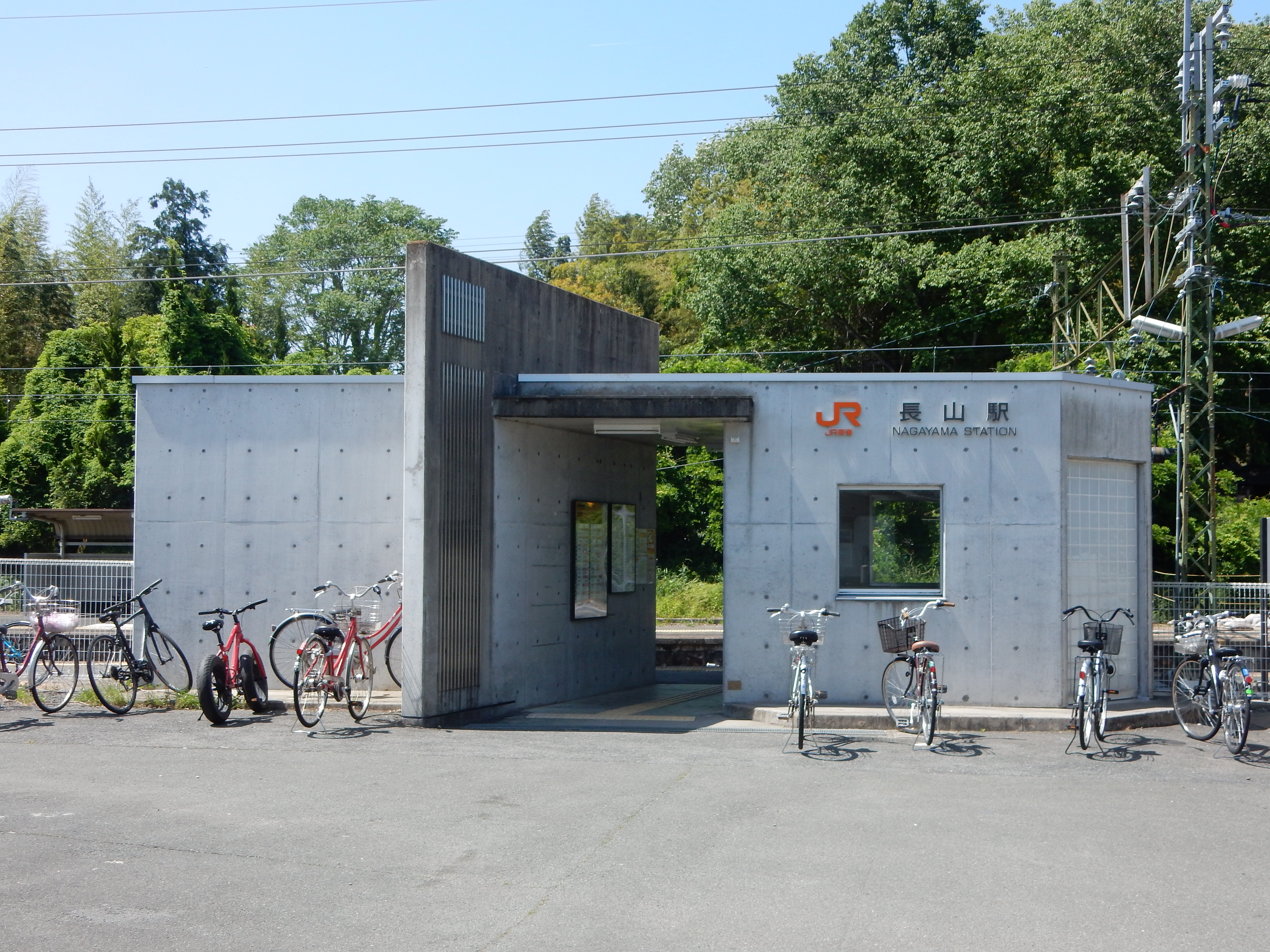
- Nagayama Station in April 2018

General information
- Location: Nishisuijinbira Kaminagayamacho, Toyokawa-shi, Aichi-ken 441-1202; Japan
- Coordinates: 34.8646°N 137.4308°E
- Operator: JR Central
- Line: Iida Line
- Distance: 14.4 kilometers from Toyohashi
- Platforms: 2 side platforms

Other information
- Status: Unstaffed

History
- Opened: July 15, 1897

Passengers
- FY2017: 205 daily
Location
- Location within Aichi Prefecture Location within Japan

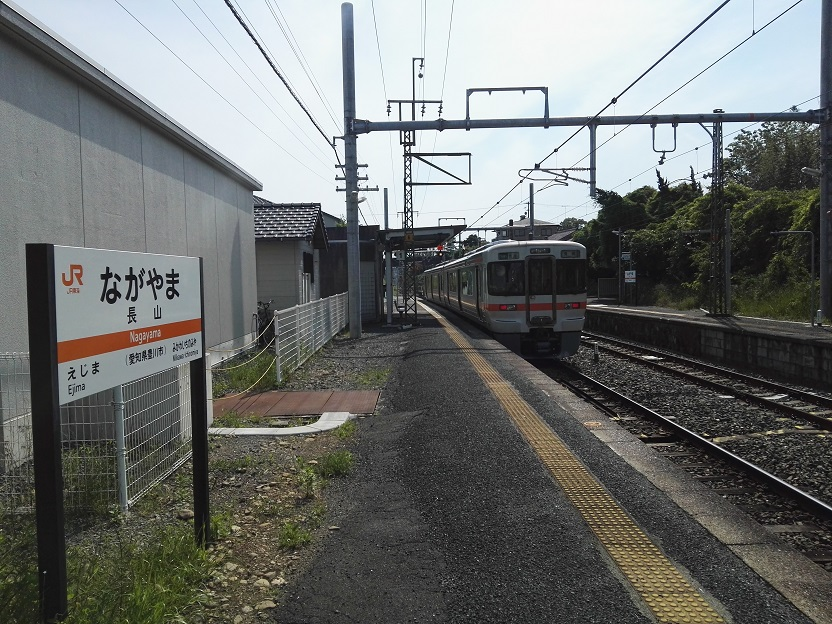
Platform

Nagayama Station (長山駅, Nagayama-eki) is a railway station in the city of Toyokawa, Aichi Prefecture, Japan, operated by Central Japan Railway Company (JR Tōkai).

== Lines ==
Nagayama Station is served by the Iida Line, and is located 14.4 kilometers from the southern terminus of the line at Toyohashi Station.

== Station layout ==
The station has two opposed side platforms connected by a level crossing. The station building has automated ticket machines, TOICA automated turnstiles and is unattended.

=== Platforms ===
| 1 | ■ Iida Line | For Toyohashi |
| 2 | ■ Iida Line | For Toyokawa, Iida |

== Adjacent stations ==
| « | Service | » |
Central Japan Railway Company
Iida Line
Limited Express "Inaji" (特急「伊那路」): Does not stop at this station
| Mikawa-Ichinomiya | Local (普通) | Ejima |

== Station history ==
Nagayama Station was established on October 19, 1898 as a station on the now-defunct Toyokawa Railway (豊川鉄道, Toyokawa Tetsudō). On August 1, 1943, the Toyokawa Railway was nationalized, along with some other local lines to form the Japanese Government Railways (JGR) Iida Line. Scheduled freight operations were discontinued in 1962 and small parcel operations from 1971. The station has been unattended since February 1984. Along with its division and privatization of JNR on April 1, 1987, the station came under the control and operation of the Central Japan Railway Company. (JR Tōkai). A new station building was completed in January 2002.

== Passenger statistics ==
In fiscal 2017, the station was used by an average of 205 passengers daily.

== Surrounding area ==
- Toyokawa River
- Ichinomiya Tobu Elementary School

== See also ==
- List of railway stations in Japan
