= Yamabuki Station =

Railway station in Takamori, Nagano Prefecture, Japan

Yamabuki Station 山吹駅
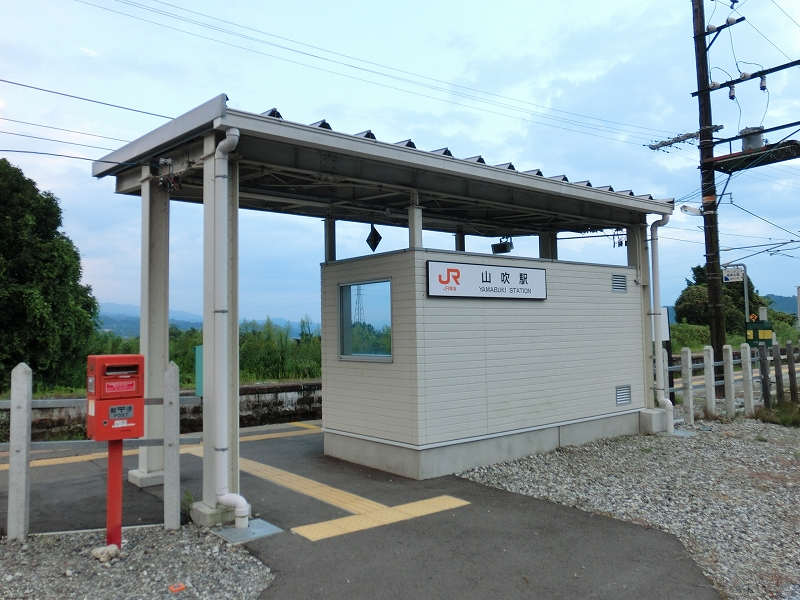
- Yamabuki Station in August 2011

General information
- Location: Yamabuki, Takamori-cho, Shimoina-gun, Nagano-ken 399-3101; Japan
- Coordinates: 35.5777°N 137.9033°E
- Elevation: 460 m (1,510 ft)
- Operator: JR Central
- Line: Iida Line
- Distance: 140.5 km from Toyohashi
- Platforms: 1 side platform

Other information
- Status: Unstaffed

History
- Opened: 15 January 1923

Passengers
- FY2016: 75 (daily)
Location
- Location within Nagano Prefecture Location within Japan

Yamabuki Station (山吹駅, Yamabuki-eki) is a railway station on the Iida Line in the town of Takamori, Shimoina District, Nagano Prefecture, Japan operated by Central Japan Railway Company (JR Central).

== Lines ==
Yamabuki Station is served by the Iida Line and is 140.5 kilometers from the starting point of the line at Toyohashi Station.

== Station layout ==
The station consists of a single ground-level side platform serving one bi-directional track. The station is unattended.

== Adjacent stations ==
| « | Service | » |
Iida Line
Rapid Misuzu (快速みすず): Does not stop at this station
| Shimodaira | Local (普通) | Ina-Ōshima |

== History ==
Yamabuki Station opened on 15 January 1923. With the privatization of Japanese National Railways (JNR) on 1 April 1987, the station came under the control of JR Central. A new station building was completed in February 2009.

== Passenger statistics ==
In fiscal 2016, the station was used by an average of 75 passengers daily (boarding passengers only).

== Surrounding area ==
- Yamabuki Transformer Station
- National Route 153

== See also ==
- List of railway stations in Japan
