= Takamori, Nagano =

Takamori 高森町
- Town
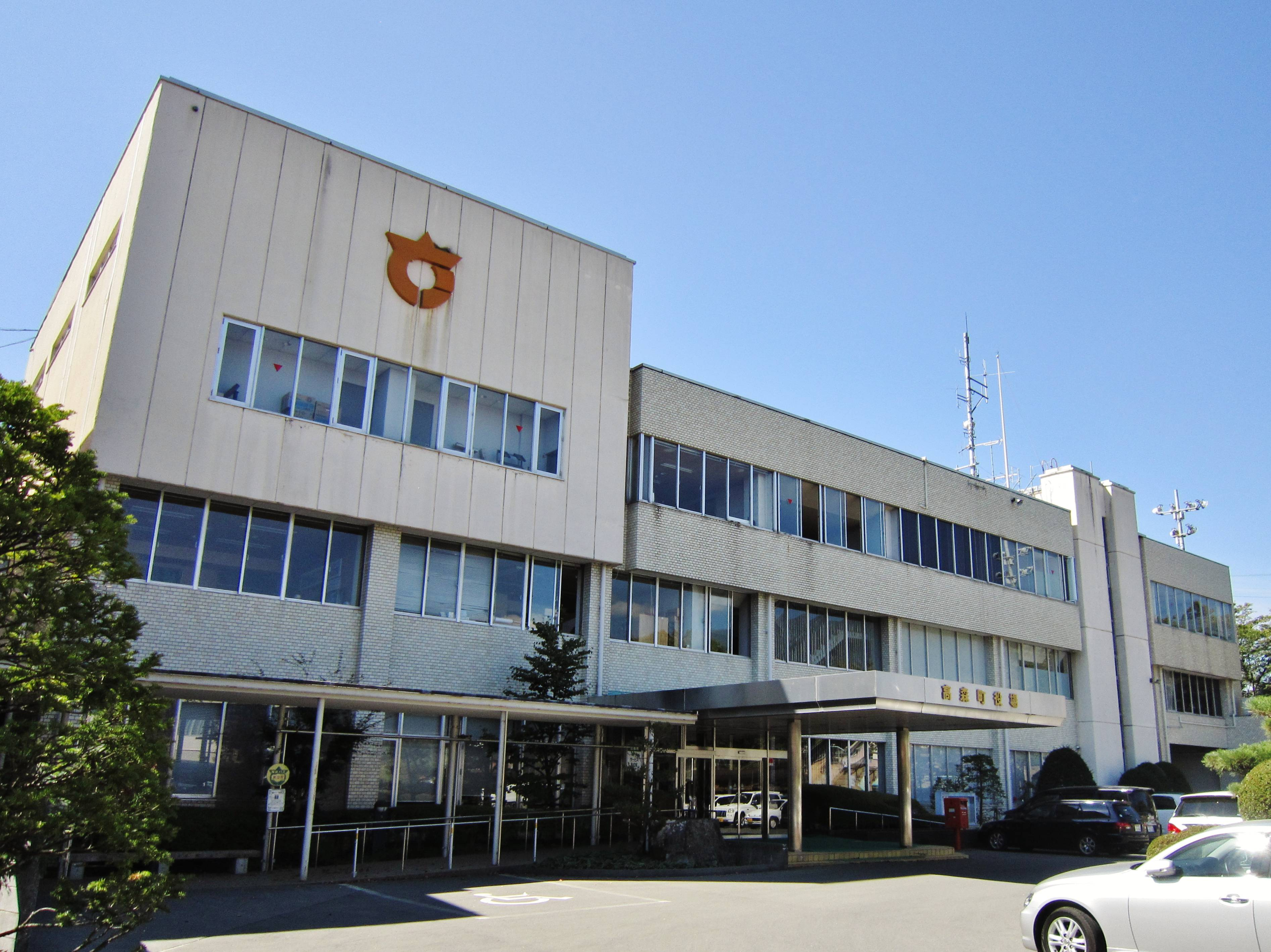
- Takamori Town Hall

- Flag Seal

- Location of Takamori in Nagano Prefecture

- Coordinates: 35°33′5.5″N 137°52′42.6″E
- Country: Japan
- Region: Chūbu (Kōshin'etsu)
- Prefecture: Nagano
- District: Shimoina

Area
  - Total: 45.36 km^{2} (17.51 sq mi)

Population (April 2019)
  - Total: 13,067
  - Density: 288.1/km^{2} (746.1/sq mi)
- Time zone: UTC+9 (Japan Standard Time)
- Symbols
  - Tree: Osmanthus fragrans, Diospyros kaki
  - Flower: Kerria japonica
- Phone number: 0265-35-3111
- Address: 2183-1 Shimoichida Hiraoka Takamori-machi, Shimoina-gun, Nagano-ken 399-3193
- Website: Official website

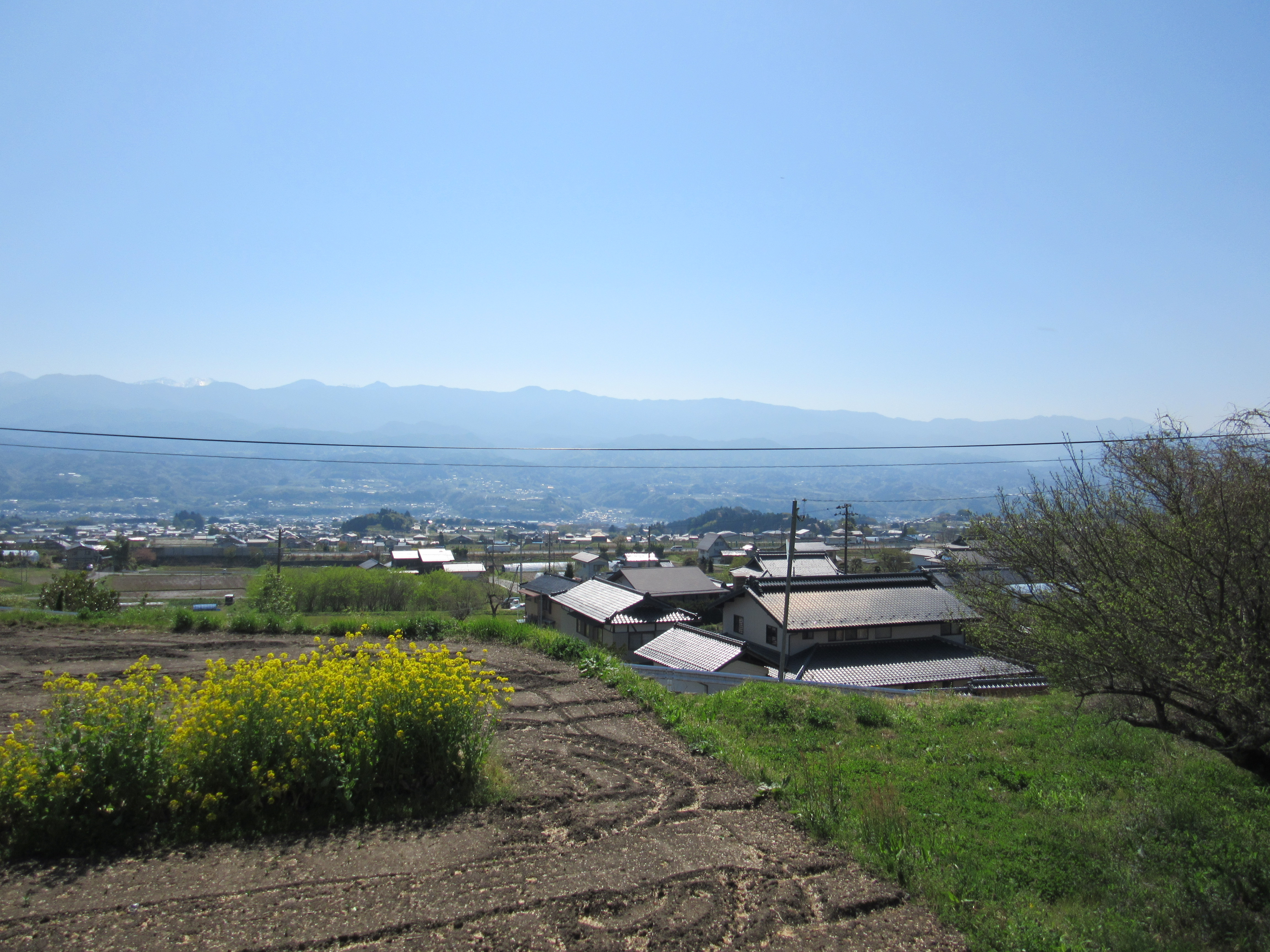
Takamori landscape

Takamori (高森町, Takamori-machi) is a town located in Nagano Prefecture, Japan. As of 1 April 2014, the town had an estimated population of 13.067 in 4427 households, and a population density of 290 persons per km^{2}. The total area of the town is 45.36 square kilometres (17.51 sq mi).

== Geography ==
Takamori is in the mountainous south of Nagano Prefecture, in a valley formed by the Tenryu River between the Kiso Mountains and the Akaishi Mountains

=== Surrounding municipalities ===
- Nagano Prefecture
  - Iida
  - Matsukawa
  - Takagi
  - Toyooka

=== Climate ===
The town has a climate characterized by hot and humid summers, and cold winters (Köppen climate classification Cfa). The average annual temperature in Takamori is 13.2 °C. The average annual rainfall is 1628 mm with September as the wettest month. The temperatures are highest on average in August, at around 25.5 °C, and lowest in January, at around 1.3 °C.

== Demographics ==
Per Japanese census data, the population of Takamori has recently plateaued after several decades of growth.

Historical population
Year	Pop.	±%
1940	10,213	—
1950	12,295	+20.4%
1960	10,627	−13.6%
1970	9,885	−7.0%
1980	11,488	+16.2%
1990	12,232	+6.5%
2000	12,528	+2.4%
2010	13,214	+5.5%
2020	12,811	−3.0%

== History ==
The area of present-day Takamori was part of ancient Shinano Province. The modern town was established on July 1, 1956, by the merger of the villages of Ichida and Yamabuki.

== Economy ==
Takamori is traditionally noted for its production of persimmons. The Yokohama Rubber Company has a plant in Takamori.

== Education ==
Takamori has one public elementary school and one public middle school operated by the town government. The town does not have a high school.

== Transportation ==
=== Railway ===
- JR Tokai – Iida Line
  - Shimo-Ichida - Ichida - Shimodaira - Yamabuki

=== Highway ===
- Chūō Expressway
- National Route 153

== Sister cities ==
- Omaezaki, Shizuoka

== In popular culture ==
In Season 6 of the animated spy comedy Archer, holdout soldier Sato Kentaro encounters the titular character in the jungles of Borneo. Ensuing discussion reveals that Sato, his wife, and young daughter lived in Takamori before the outbreak of World War II.
