= Kiriishi Station =

Railway station in Iida, Nagano Prefecture, Japan

Kiriishi Station 切石駅
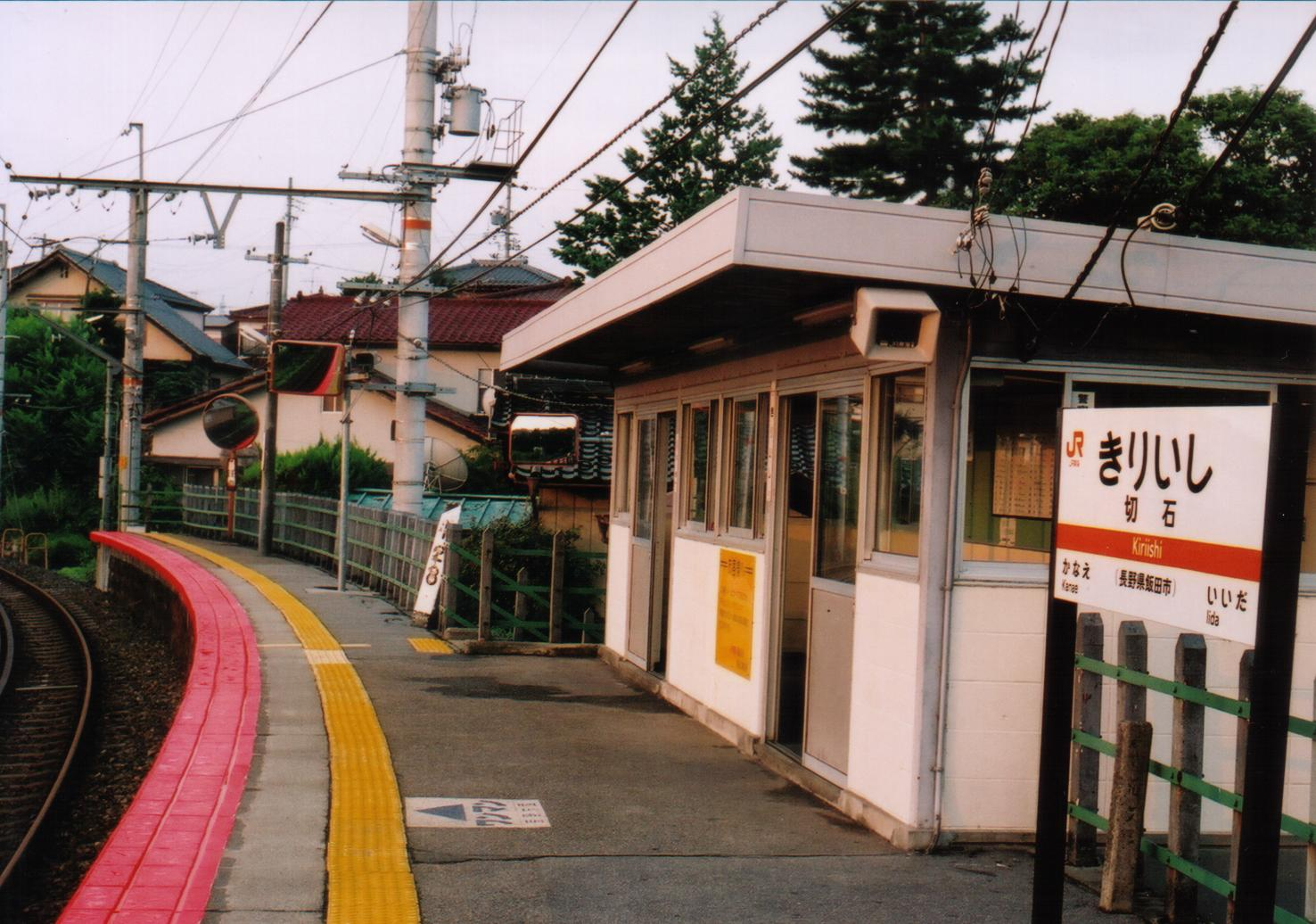
- Kiriishi Station platform in August 2008

General information
- Location: Kanae-Kirishi, Iida-shi, Nagano-ken 395-0807; Japan
- Coordinates: 35.5125°N 137.8092°E
- Elevation: 493 meters
- Operator: JR Central
- Line: Iida Line
- Distance: 127.7 km from Toyohashi
- Platforms: 1 side platform

Other information
- Status: Unstaffed

History
- Opened: 1 August 1943

Passengers
- FY2013: 123 (daily)
Location
- Location within Nagano Prefecture Location within Japan

Kiriishi Station (切石駅, Kiriishi-eki) is a railway station on the Iida Line in the city of Iida, Nagano Prefecture, Japan, operated by Central Japan Railway Company (JR Central).

== Lines ==
Kiriishi Station is served by the Iida Line and is 127.7 kilometers from the starting point of the line at Toyohashi Station.

== Station layout ==
The station consists of a single ground-level side platform serving one bi-directional track. There is no station building, but only a platform built on top of the platform.

== Adjacent stations ==
«	Service	»
Iida Line
Limited Express Inaji: Does not stop at this station
Kanae	Local	Iida

== History ==
Kiriishi Station opened on 17 December 1926 a temporary stop. It was elevated to a full station on 1 August 1943. With the privatization of Japanese National Railways (JNR) on 1 April 1987, the station came under the control of JR Central.

== Passenger statistics ==
In fiscal 2016, the station was used by an average of 123 passengers daily (boarding passengers only).

== Surrounding area ==
- National Route 256

== See also ==
- List of railway stations in Japan
