= Shimodaira Station =

Railway station in Takamori, Nagano Prefecture, Japan

Shimodaira Station 下平駅
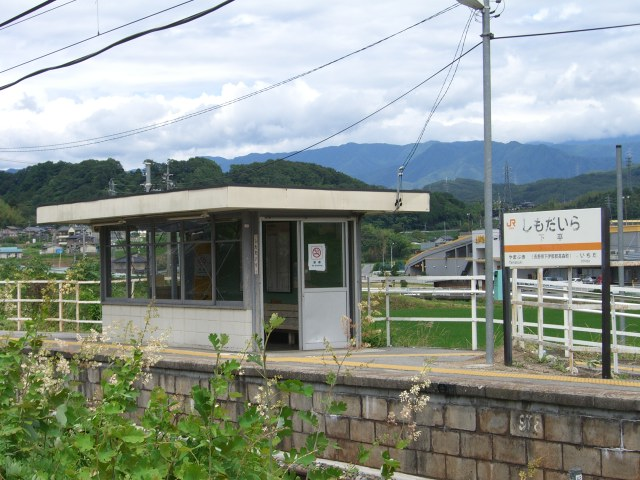
- Shimodaira Station in August 2011

General information
- Location: Yamabuki, Shimodaira, Takamori-cho, Shimoina-gun, Nagano-ken 399-3101; Japan
- Coordinates: 35.5724°N 137.8959°E
- Elevation: 442 m (1,450 ft)
- Operator: JR Central
- Line: Iida Line
- Distance: 139.5 km from Toyohashi
- Platforms: 1 side platform

Other information
- Status: Unstaffed

History
- Opened: 13 March 1923

Passengers
- FY2016: 106 (daily)
Location
- Location within Nagano Prefecture Location within Japan

Shimodaira Station (下平駅, Shimodaira-eki) is a railway station on the Iida Line in the town of Takamori, Shimoina District, Nagano Prefecture, Japan operated by Central Japan Railway Company (JR Central).

== Lines ==
Shimodaira Station is served by the Iida Line and is 139.5 kilometers from the starting point of the line at Toyohashi Station.

== Station layout ==
The station consists of a single ground-level side platform serving one bi-directional track. The station is unattended. There is no station building, but only a waiting room on the platform.

== Adjacent stations ==
«	Service	»
Iida Line
Rapid Misuzu: Does not stop at this station
Ichida	Local	Yamabuki

== History ==
Shimodaira Station opened on 13 March 1923. With the privatization of Japanese National Railways (JNR) on 1 April 1987, the station came under the control of JR Central. A new station building was completed in February 2009.

== Passenger statistics ==
In fiscal 2016, the station was used by an average of 106 passengers daily (boarding passengers only).

== Surrounding area ==
- Tenryū River
- National Route 153

== See also ==
- List of railway stations in Japan
