= Motozenkōji Station =

Railway station in Iida, Nagano Prefecture, Japan

Motozenkōji Station 元善光寺駅
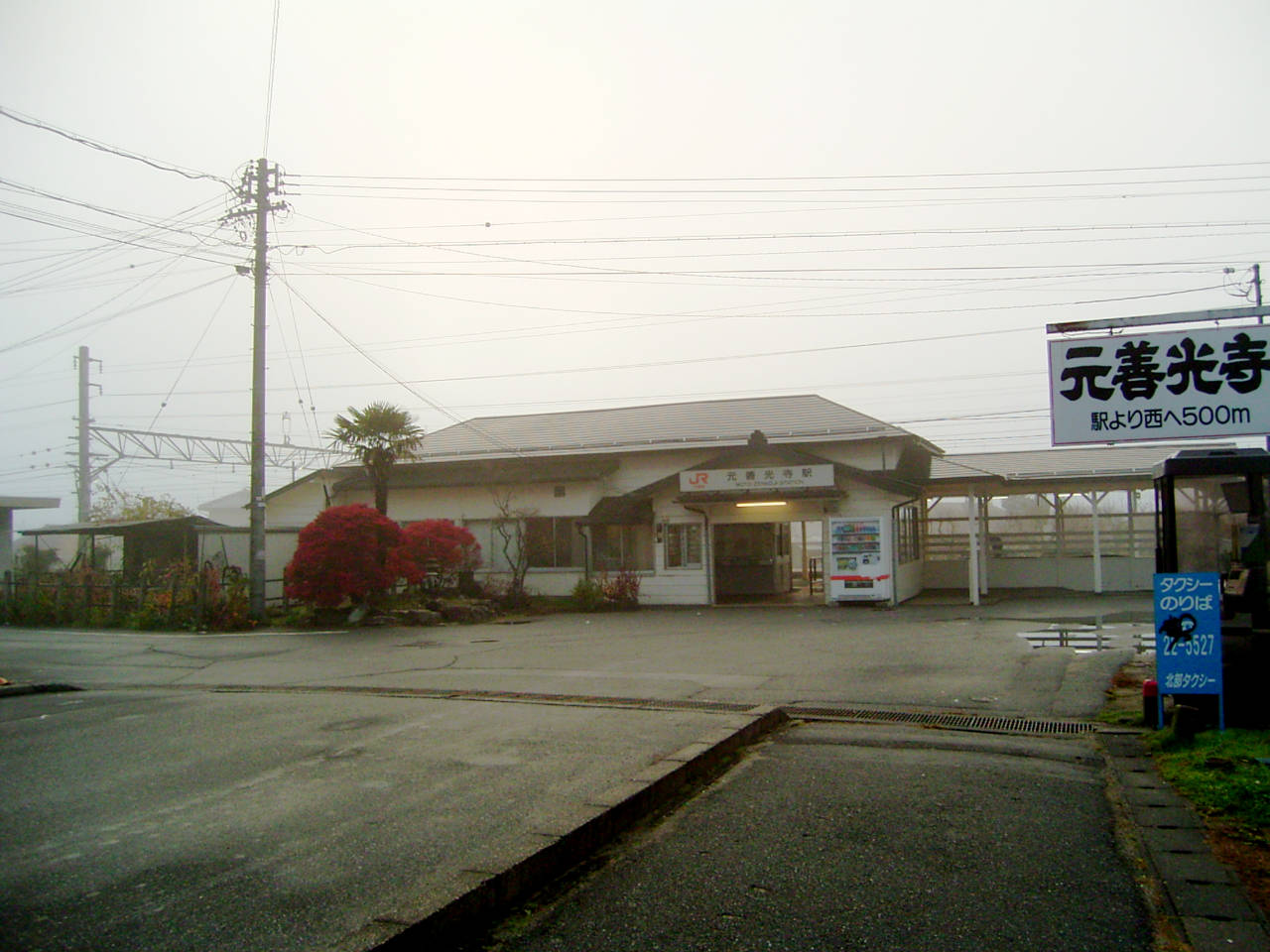
- Motozenkōji Station in November 2004

General information
- Location: 3537 Zenkoji, Iida-shi, Nagano-ken 395-0001; Japan
- Coordinates: 35.5337°N 137.8611°E
- Elevation: 441 meters
- Operator: JR Central; JR Freight
- Line: Iida Line
- Distance: 133.8 km from Toyohashi
- Platforms: 1 side + 1 island platform

History
- Opened: 18 March 1923

Passengers
- FY2015: 263 (daily)
Location
- Location within Nagano Prefecture Location within Japan

Motozenkōji Station (元善光寺駅, Motozenkōji-eki) is a railway station on the Iida Line in the city of Iida, Nagano Prefecture, Japan, operated by Central Japan Railway Company (JR Central). It is also a freight terminal for the Japan Freight Railway Company.

== Lines ==
Motozenkōji Station is served by the Iida Line and is 133.8 kilometers from the starting point of the line at Toyohashi Station.

== Station layout ==
The station consists of a one ground-level side platform and one ground-level island platform connected by a level crossing.

=== Platforms ===
1	■ Iida Line	for Tatsuno
2	■ Iida Line	for Iida
3	■ Iida Line	

== Adjacent stations ==
«	Service	»
Iida Line
Iida	Rapid Misuzu	Ichida
Ina-Kamisato	Local	Shimoichida

== History ==
Motozenkōji Station opened on 18 March 1923. It was renamed Zenkōji Station (座光寺駅) from 1943 to 1950, when it was reverted to its original name. With the privatization of Japanese National Railways (JNR) on 1 April 1987, the station came under the control of JR Central.

== Passenger statistics ==
In fiscal 2016, the station was used by an average of 263 passengers daily (boarding passengers only).

== Surrounding area ==
Motozenkoji village is the original home of the Zenkoji Temple, now in Nagano.

== See also ==
- List of railway stations in Japan
