= Ina-Kamisato Station =

Railway station in Iida, Nagano Prefecture, Japan

Ina-Kamisato Station 伊那上郷駅
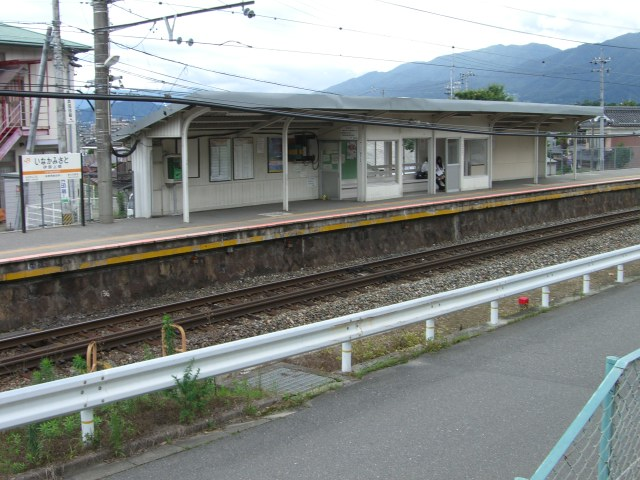
- Ina-Kamisato Station June 2008

General information
- Location: 276 Kamisato-Kuroda, Iida-shi, Nagano-ken 395-0004; Japan
- Coordinates: 35.5195°N 137.8392°E
- Elevation: 500.0 meters
- Operator: JR Central
- Line: Iida Line
- Distance: 131.1 km from Toyohashi
- Platforms: 1 side platform

Other information
- Status: Unstaffed

History
- Opened: 16 December 1935
- Former names: Kamisato Station (until 1936)

Passengers
- FY2015: 698 (daily)
Location
- Location within Nagano Prefecture Location within Japan

Ina-Kamisato Station (伊那上郷駅, Ina-Kamisato-eki) is a railway station on the Iida Line in Iida, Nagano Prefecture, Japan, operated by Central Japan Railway Company (JR Central).

== Lines ==
Ina-Kamisato Station is served by the Iida Line and is 131.1 kilometers from the starting point of the line at Toyohashi Station.

== Station layout ==
The station consists of a single ground-level side platform serving one bi-directional track. There is no station building, but only a platform built on top of the platform. The station is unattended.

== Adjacent stations ==
«	Service	»
Iida Line
Rapid Misuzu: Does not stop at this station
Sakuramachi	Local	Motozenkōji

== History ==
The station opened in October 1923 as the Kamisato Stop (上郷停留場, Kamisato Teiryujo) on the Ina Electric Railway. It became Kamisato Station (上郷駅) on 16 January 1935, and was renamed Ina-Kamisato in January 1936. With the privatization of Japanese National Railways (JNR) on 1 April 1987, the station came under the control of JR Central.

== Passenger statistics ==
In fiscal 2016, the station was used by an average of 698 passengers daily (boarding passengers only).

== Surrounding area ==
- Kuroda Puppet Theatre
- Iida High School

== See also ==
- List of railway stations in Japan
