= Shimoyamamura Station =

Railway station in Iida, Nagano Prefecture, Japan

Shimoyamamura Station 下山村駅
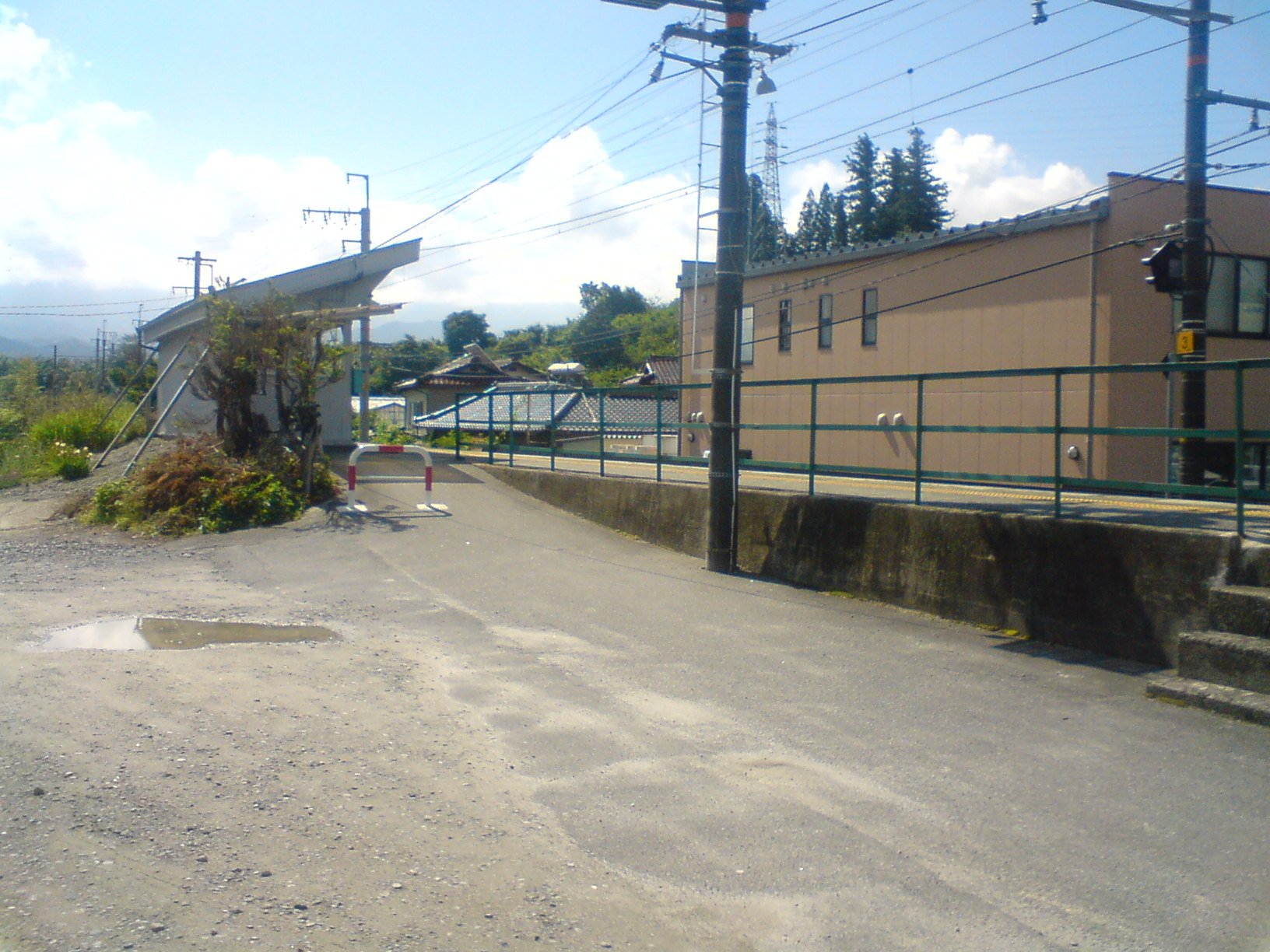
- Shimoyamamura Station in June 2008

General information
- Location: Kanaeshimoyama, Iida-shi, Nagano-ken 395-0803; Japan
- Coordinates: 35.5039°N 137.8396°E
- Elevation: 425 meters
- Operator: JR Central
- Line: Iida Line
- Distance: 124.7 km from Toyohashi
- Platforms: 1 side platform

Other information
- Status: Unstaffed

History
- Opened: 17 December 1926

Passengers
- FY2015: 38 (daily)
Location
- Location within Nagano Prefecture Location within Japan

Shimoyamamura Station (下山村駅, Shimoyamamura-eki) is a railway station on the Iida Line in Iida, Nagano Prefecture, Japan, operated by Central Japan Railway Company (JR Central).

== Lines ==
Shimoyamamura Station is served by the Iida Line and is 124.7 kilometers from the starting point of the line at Toyohashi Station.

== Station layout ==
The station consists of a single ground-level side platform serving one bi-directional track. There is no station building, but only a small shelter built on top of the platform. The station is unattended.

== Adjacent stations ==
«	Service	»
Iida Line
Limited Express Inaji: Does not stop at this station
Ina-Yawata	Local	Kanae

== History ==
Shimoyamamura Station opened on 17 December 1926. With the privatization of Japanese National Railways (JNR) on 1 April 1987, the station came under the control of JR Central.

== Passenger statistics ==
In fiscal 2015, the station was used by an average of 38 passengers daily (boarding passengers only).

== Surrounding area ==
The station is located in a rural area.

== See also ==
- List of railway stations in Japan
