= Kawaji Station =

Railway station in Iida, Nagano Prefecture, Japan

Kawaji Station 川路駅
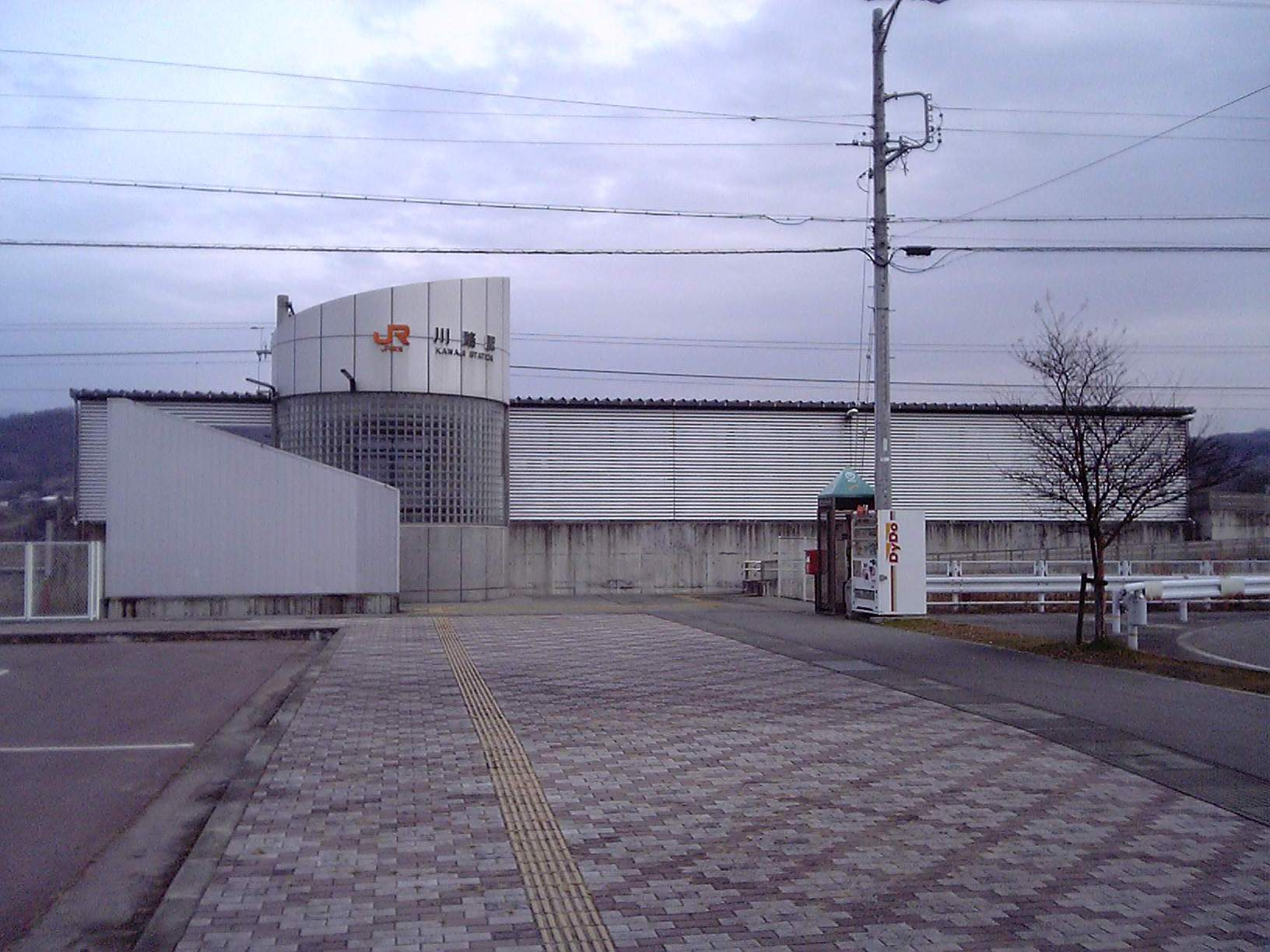
- Kawaji Station in December 2012

General information
- Location: Kawaji-tsujimae, Iida-shi, Nagano-ken 399-2431; Japan
- Coordinates: 35.4527°N 137.8157°E
- Elevation: 373 meters
- Operator: JR Central
- Line: Iida Line
- Distance: 117.5 km from Toyohashi
- Platforms: 1 side platform

Other information
- Status: Unstaffed

History
- Opened: 26 December 1927
- Former names: Ina-Kawaji (to 1943)

Passengers
- FY2015: 113 (daily)
Location
- Location within Nagano Prefecture Location within Japan

Kawaji Station (川路駅, Kawaji-eki) is a train station in Iida, Nagano Prefecture, Japan, operated by Central Japan Railway Company (JR Central).

== Lines ==
Kawaji Station is served by the Iida Line and is 117.5 kilometers from the starting point of the line at Toyohashi Station.

== Station layout ==
The station consists of a single ground-level side platform serving one bi-directional track. The station is unattended.

== Adjacent stations ==
| « | Service | » |
Iida Line
Limited Express Inaji: Does not stop at this station
| Tenryūkyō | Local | Tokimata |

== History ==
Kawaji Station opened on 26 December 1927 and Ina-Kawaji Station (伊那川路駅). It was renamed to its present name on 1 August 1943 when the Ina Electric Railway was nationalized. With the privatization of Japanese National Railways (JNR) on 1 April 1987, the station came under the control of JR Central. A new station building was completed in May 2001.

== Passenger statistics ==
In fiscal 2015, the station was used by an average of 113 passengers daily (boarding passengers only).

== Surrounding area ==
- Tenryū River
- National Route 151

== See also ==
- List of railway stations in Japan
