= Kanae Station =

Railway station in Iida, Nagano Prefecture, Japan

Kanae Station 鼎駅
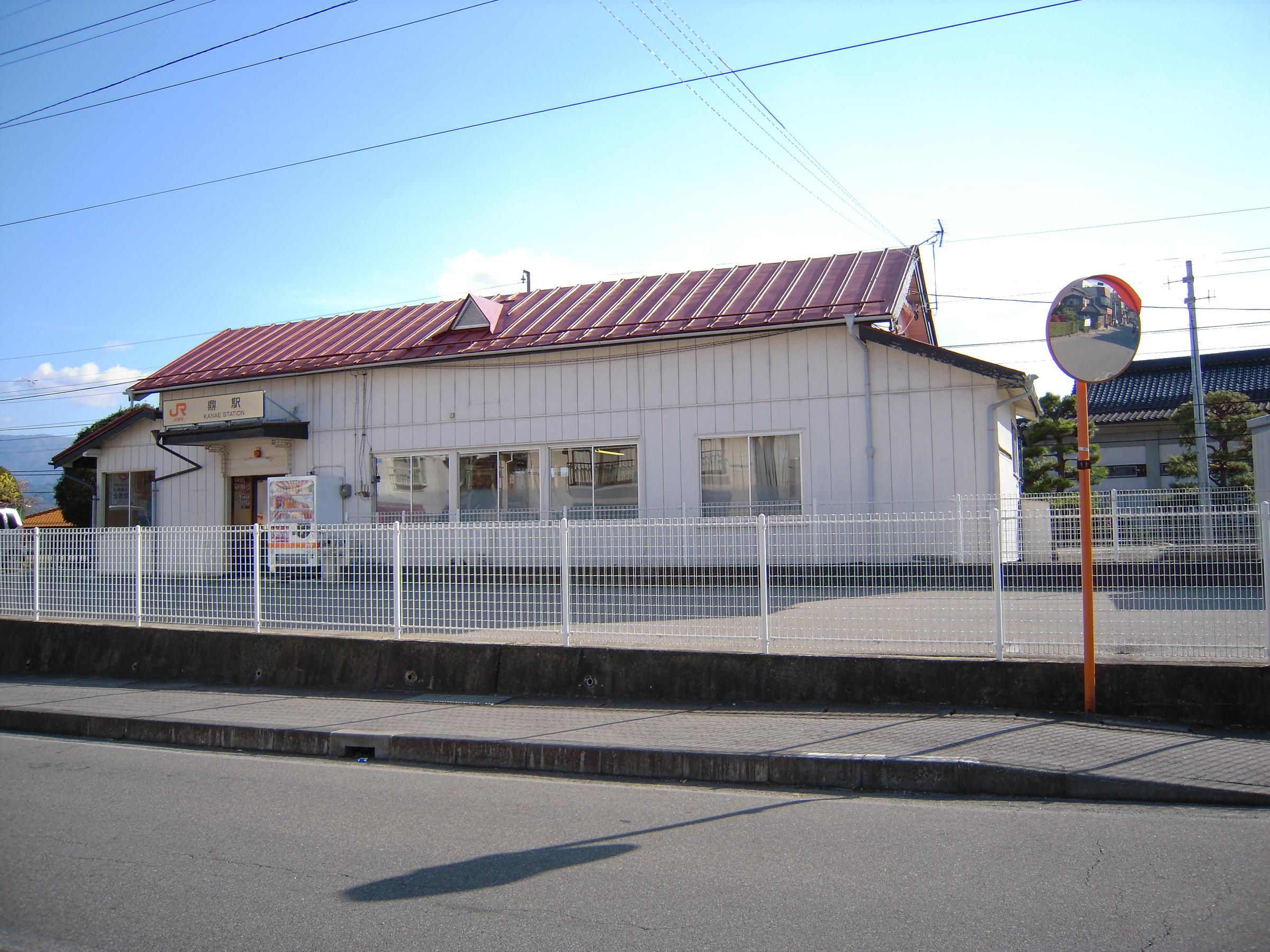
- Kanae Station in November 2009

General information
- Location: Kane Nakahira, Iida-shi, Nagano-ken 395-0801; Japan
- Coordinates: 35.5066°N 137.8286°E
- Elevation: 450 meters
- Operator: JR Central
- Line: Iida Line
- Distance: 125.7 km from Toyohashi
- Platforms: 1 side platform

Other information
- Status: Unstaffed

History
- Opened: 17 December 1926

Passengers
- FY2015: 574 (daily)
Location
- Location within Nagano Prefecture Location within Japan

Kanae Station (鼎駅, Kanae-eki) is a railway station in the city of Iida, Nagano Prefecture, Japan, operated by Central Japan Railway Company (JR Central).

== Lines ==
Kanae Station is served by the Iida Line and is 125.7 kilometers from the starting point of the line at Toyohashi Station.

== Station layout ==
The station consists of a single ground-level side platform serving one bi-directional track.

== Adjacent stations ==
«	Service	»
Iida Line
Limited Express Inaji: Does not stop at this station
Shimoyamamura	Local	Kiriishi

== History ==
Kanae Station opened on 17 December 1926. With the privatization of Japanese National Railways (JNR) on 1 April 1987, the station came under the control of JR Central.

== Passenger statistics ==
In fiscal 2015, the station was used by an average of 574 passengers daily (boarding passengers only).

== See also ==
- List of railway stations in Japan
