= Shimo-Ichida Station =

Railway station in Takamori, Nagano Prefecture, Japan

Shimo-Ichida Station 下市田駅
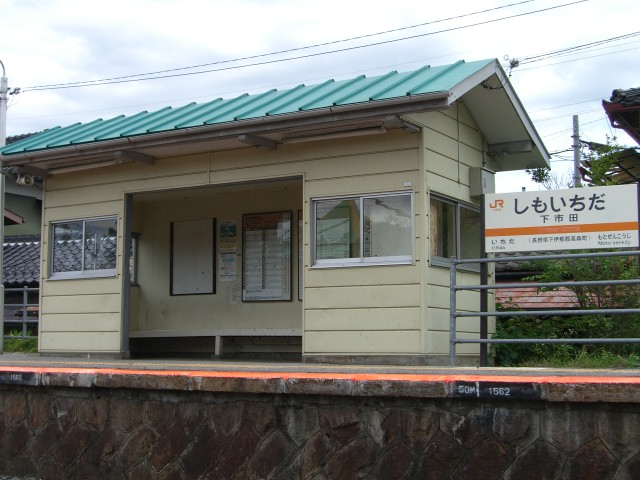
- Shimo-Ichida Station in June 2008

General information
- Location: Shimoichida, Takamori-machi, Shimoina-gun, Nagano-ken 399-3103; Japan
- Coordinates: 35.5442°N 137.8766°E
- Elevation: 435 m (1,427 ft)
- Operator: JR Central
- Line: Iida Line
- Distance: 135.6 km from Toyohashi
- Platforms: 1 side platform

Other information
- Status: Unstaffed

History
- Opened: 18 March 1923

Passengers
- FY2016: 62 (daily)
Location
- Location within Nagano Prefecture Location within Japan

Shimo-Ichida Station (下市田駅, Shimo-Ichida-eki) is a railway station on the Iida Line in the town of Takamori, Shimoina District, Nagano Prefecture, Japan operated by Central Japan Railway Company (JR Central).

== Lines ==
Shimo-Ichida Station is served by the Iida Line and is 135.6 kilometers from the starting point of the line at Toyohashi Station.

== Station layout ==
The station consists of a single ground-level side platform serving one bi-directional track. The station is unattended. There is no station building, but only a waiting room built onto the platform.

== Adjacent stations ==
«	Service	»
Iida Line
Rapid Misuzu: Does not stop at this station
Motozenkōji	Local	Ichida

== History ==
Shimo-Ichida Station opened on 18 March 1923. With the privatization of Japanese National Railways (JNR) on 1 April 1987, the station came under the control of JR Central. A new station building was completed in February 2009.

== Passenger statistics ==
In fiscal 2016, the station was used by an average of 62 passengers daily (boarding passengers only).

== Surrounding area ==
- National Route 153

== See also ==
- List of railway stations in Japan
