= Ina-Ōshima Station =

Railway station in Matsukawa, Nagano Prefecture, Japan

Ina-Ōshima Station 伊那大島駅
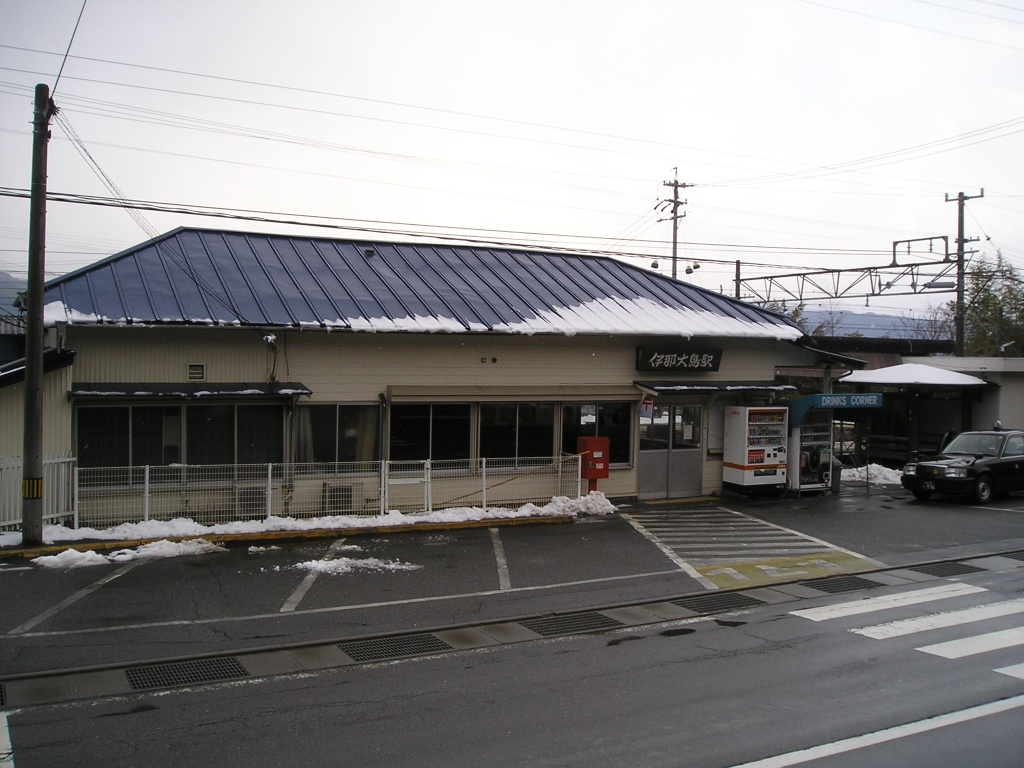
- Ina-Ōshima Station in February 2006

General information
- Location: Motoojima, Matsukawa-cho, Shimoina-gun, Nagano-ken 399-3303; Japan
- Coordinates: 35.5957°N 137.9133°E
- Elevation: 519 m (1,703 ft)
- Operator: JR Central
- Line: Iida Line
- Distance: 143.1 km from Toyohashi
- Platforms: 2 side platforms

Other information
- Status: Unstaffed

History
- Opened: 13 July 1922

Passengers
- FY2016: 366 (daily)
Location
- Location within Nagano Prefecture Location within Japan

Ina-Ōshima Station (伊那大島駅, Ina-Ōshima-eki) is a railway station on the Iida Line in the town of Matsukawa, Shimoina District, Nagano Prefecture, Japan operated by Central Japan Railway Company (JR Central).

== Lines ==
Ina-Ōshima Station is served by the Iida Line and is 143.1 kilometers from the starting point of the line at Toyohashi Station.

== Station layout ==
The station consists of two opposed ground-level side platforms connected by a level crossing. The station is staffed.

=== Platforms ===
1	■ Iida Line	for Tatsuno
2	■ Iida Line	for Iida and Tenryūkyō

== Adjacent stations ==
«	Service	»
Iida Line
Ichida	Rapid Misuzu (快速みすず)	Kamikatagiri
Yamabuki	Local (普通)	Kamikatagiri

== History ==
Ina-Ōshima Station opened on 13 July 1922. With the privatization of Japanese National Railways (JNR) on 1 April 1987, the station came under the control of JR Central. A new station building was completed in February 2009.

== Passenger statistics ==
In fiscal 2016, the station was used by an average of 366 passengers daily (boarding passengers only).

== Surrounding area ==
- Matsukawa Town Hall
- Matsukawa Junior High School

== See also ==
- List of railway stations in Japan
