= Ichida Station =

Railway station in Takamori, Nagano Prefecture, Japan

Ichida Station 市田駅
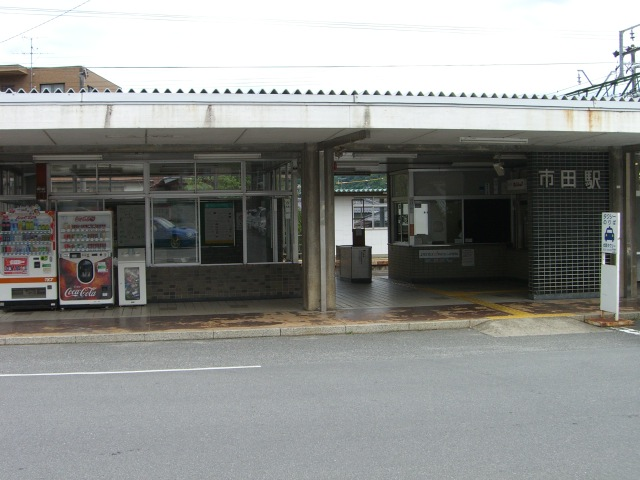
- Ichida Station in June 2008

General information
- Location: Shimoichida, Takamori-machi, Shimoina-gun, Nagano-ken 399-3103; Japan
- Coordinates: 35.5495°N 137.8870°E
- Elevation: 440 m (1,440 ft)
- Operator: JR Central
- Line: Iida Line
- Distance: 136.8 km from Toyohashi
- Platforms: 2 side platforms

Other information
- Status: Staffed

History
- Opened: 13 March 1923

Passengers
- FY2016: 418 (daily)
Location
- Location within Nagano Prefecture Location within Japan

Ichida Station (市田駅, Ichida-eki) is a railway station on the Iida Line in the town of Takamori, Shimoina District, Nagano Prefecture, Japan operated by Central Japan Railway Company (JR Central).

== Lines ==
Ichida Station is served by the Iida Line and is 136.8 kilometers from the starting point of the line at Toyohashi Station.

== Station layout ==
The station consists of a two ground-level opposed side platforms connected by a level crossing. The station is staffed.

=== Platforms ===
1	■ Iida Line	for Tatsuno
2	■ Iida Line	for Iida and Tenryūkyō

== Adjacent stations ==
«	Service	»
Iida Line
Motozenkōji	Rapid Misuzu	Ina-Ōshima
Shimoichida	Local	Shimodaira

== History ==
Ichida Station opened on 13 March 1923. A new station building was completed in February 1969. With the privatization of Japanese National Railways (JNR) on 1 April 1987, the station came under the control of JR Central. A new station building was completed in February 2009.

== Passenger statistics ==
In the 2016 fiscal year, the station was used by an average of 418 passengers daily (boarding passengers only).

== Surrounding area ==
- Tenryū River
- National Route 153

== See also ==
- List of railway stations in Japan
