= Iida Women's Junior College =

Women's junior college in Nagano, Japan

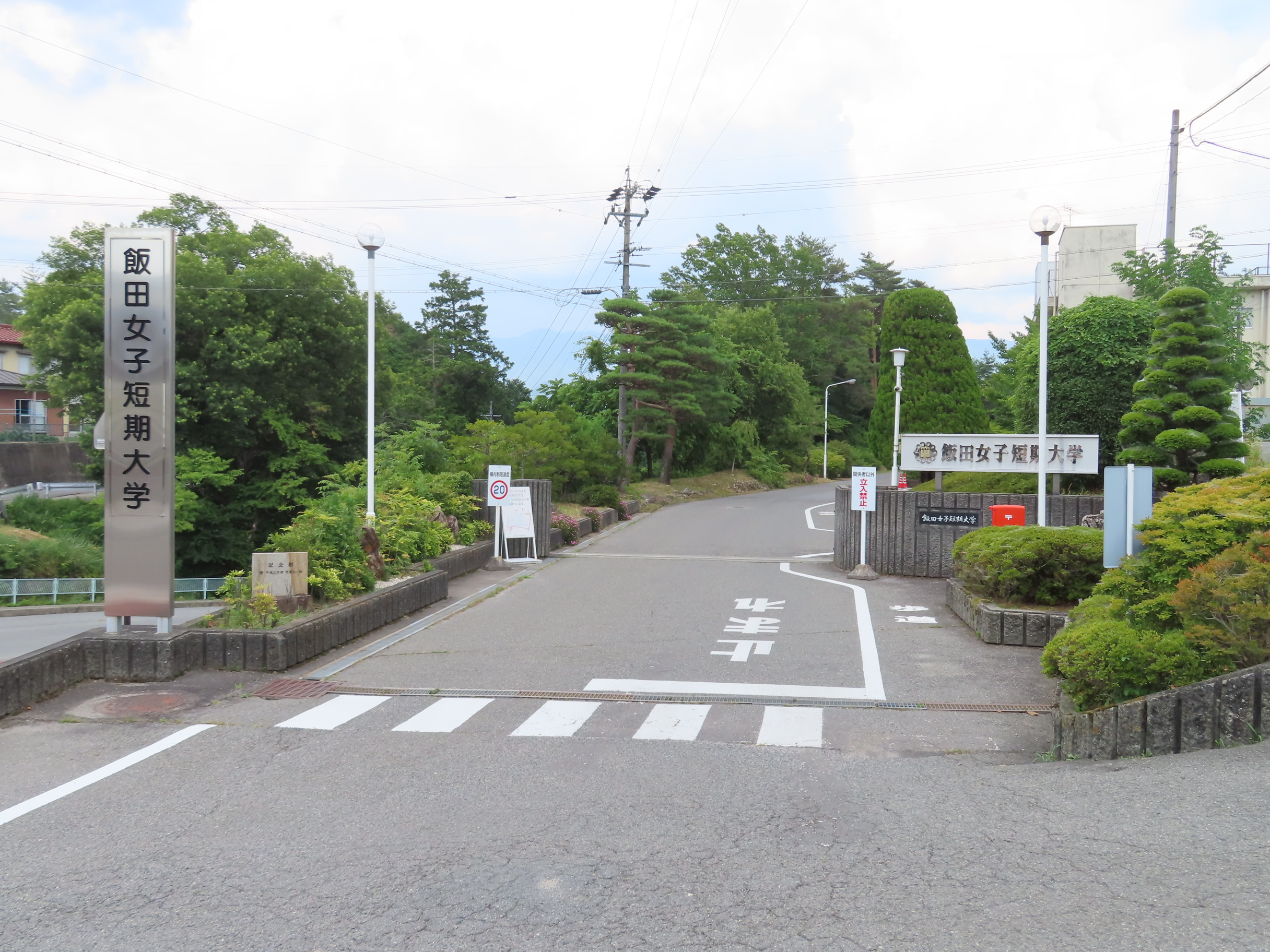
- Type: Private women's junior college
- Established: 1967; 58 years ago
- Students: 445
- Faculties: Department of Life Science; Department of Early Childhood Education; Department of Nursing
- Graduate school programs: Major in Community Nursing; Major in Midwifery; Major in Nursing Education
- Website: Official website

Iida Women's Junior College (飯田女子短期大学, Iida joshi tanki daigaku) is a private women's junior college in Iida, Nagano, Japan, established in 1967.
