= Ichida Souta =

Japanese photographer

Ichida Sōta (市田 左右太; 1843 – September 12, 1896) was a Japanese photographer.
