= Japan National Route 152 =

Road in Japan

National Route 152
- 国道152号
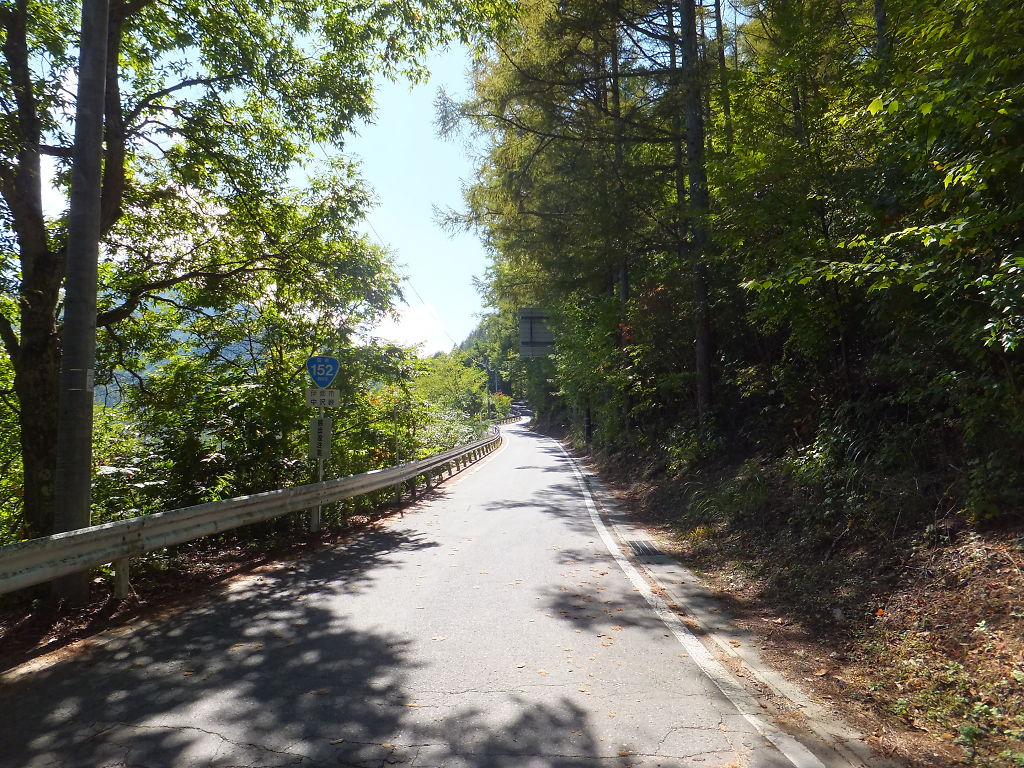

Route information
- Length: 252.4 km (156.8 mi)
- Existed: 1953–present

Major junctions
- North end: National Route 18 in Ueda, Nagano
- South end: National Route 1 in Chūō-ku, Hamamatsu

Location
- Country: Japan

Highway system
- National highways of Japan; Expressways of Japan
← National Route 151	→ National Route 153

National Route 152 is a national highway of Japan connecting Ueda, Nagano and Chūō-ku, Hamamatsu in Japan, with a total length of 252.4 km (156.8 mi).
