= Japan National Route 151 =

Road in Japan

National Route 151
- 国道151号
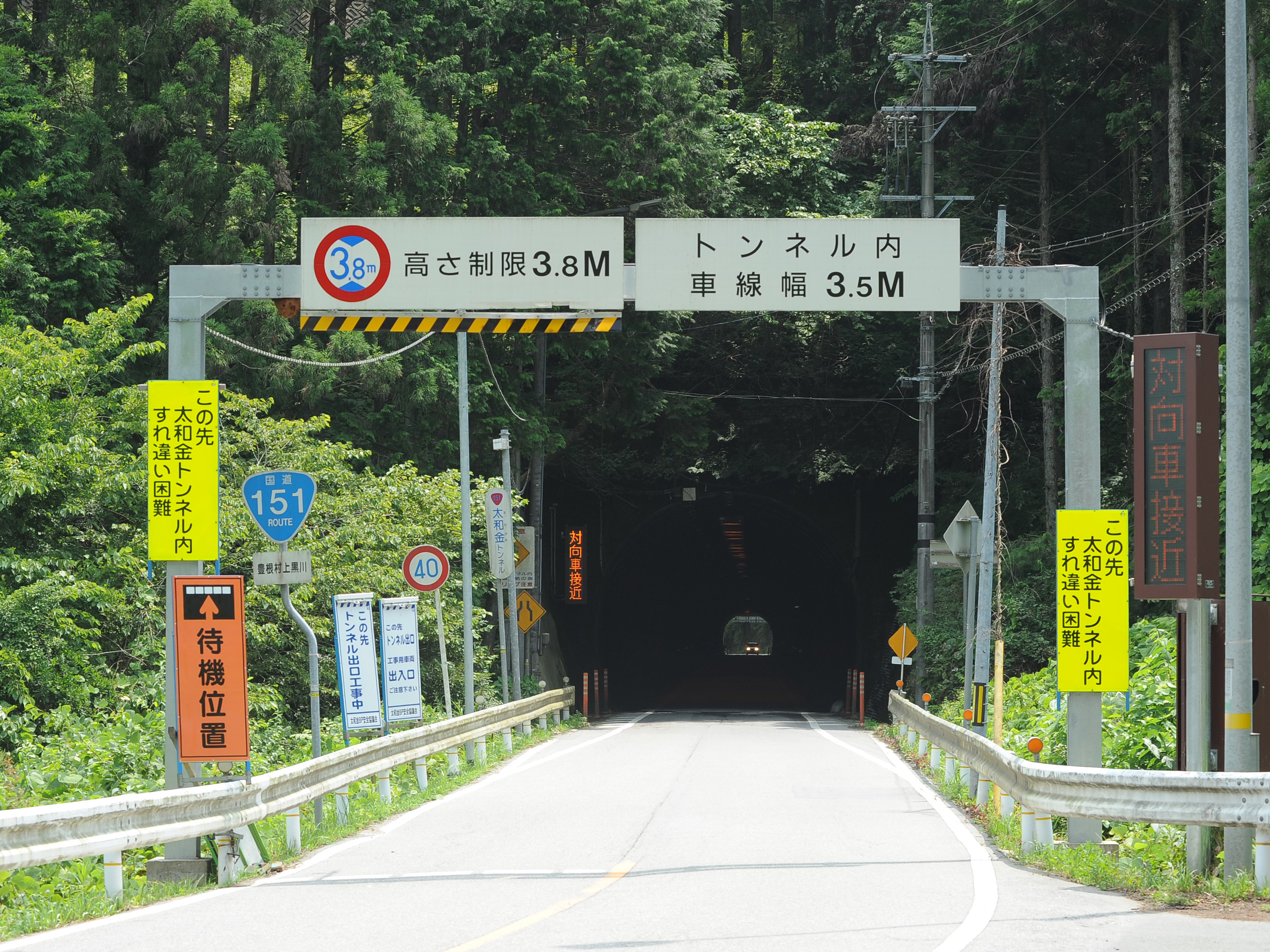

Route information
- Length: 137.4 km (85.4 mi)

Major junctions
- North end: Prefectural Route 8 / Prefectural Route 15 in Iida, Nagano
- South end: National Route 1 / National Route 247 in Toyohashi, Aichi

Location
- Country: Japan

Highway system
- National highways of Japan; Expressways of Japan
← National Route 150	→ National Route 152

National Route 151 is a national highway of Japan connecting Iida, Nagano and Toyohashi, Aichi in Japan, with a total length of 137.4 km (85.38 mi).
