= Kawagishi Station =

Railway station in Okaya, Nagano Prefecture, Japan

Kawagishi Station 川岸駅
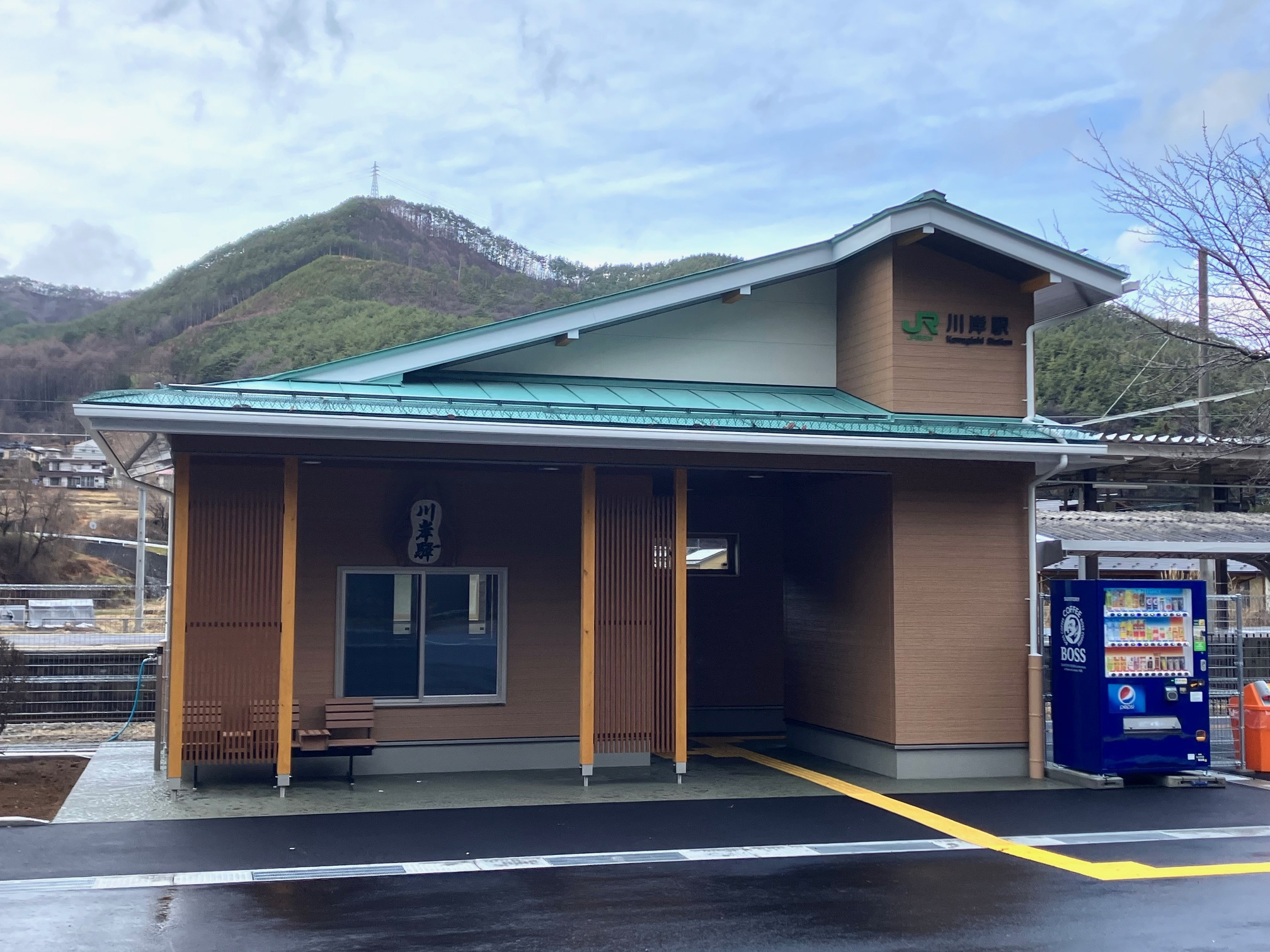
- Kawagishi Station, December 2023

General information
- Location: 3-15-25 Kawagishi, Okaya-shi, Nagano-ken 394-0045; Japan
- Coordinates: 36°1′58.7″N 138°1′19.1″E
- Elevation: 757.4 meters
- Operator: East Japan Railway Company; Central Japan Railway Company
- Lines: ■Chūō Main Line; ■ Iida Line
- Platforms: 1 island platform

Other information
- Status: Unstaffed
- Website: Official website

History
- Opened: 28 October 1923

Passengers
- FY2011: 91

Services
Preceding station	JR East	Following station
Tatsuno towards Shiojiri	Chūō Main Line Tatsuno Branch	Okaya CO59 Terminus
Preceding station	JR Central	Following station
Tatsuno towards Iida	Iida Line Rapid Misuzu	Okaya CO59 Terminus
Tatsuno One-way operation	Iida Line Rapid	Okaya CO59 Terminus
Tatsuno towards Toyohashi	Iida Line Local	Okaya CO59 Terminus
Location
- Location within Nagano Prefecture Location within Japan

Kawagishi Station (川岸駅, Kawagishi-eki) is a railway station in the city of Okaya, Nagano Prefecture, Japan jointly operated by JR Central and JR East. It is managed by JR East.

== Lines ==
Kawagishi Station is served by the old route of Chūō Main Line (Okaya-Shiojiri branch) and is 3.5 kilometers from the branching point of the line at Okaya Station and 213.9 from the terminus at Tokyo Station. A small number of trains on the Iida Line also continue past the nominal terminus of the line at Tatsuno to stop at this station and the following Okaya Station.

== Station layout ==
The station consists of one ground-level island platform serving two tracks, connected to the station building by a footbridge. The station is unattended.

=== Platforms ===
station side	■ Chūō Main Line	for Tatsuno and Ono
	■ Iida Line	for Ina and Iida
opposite side	■ Chūō Main Line	for Okaya, Kami-Suwa and Tokyo

== History ==
The station opened on 28 October 1923. With the privatization of Japanese National Railways (JNR) on 1 April 1987, the station came under the control of JR East.

== Surrounding area ==
- Tenryū River

== See also ==
- List of railway stations in Japan
