= Aoyagi Station =

Railway station in Chino, Nagano Prefecture, Japan

CO55 Aoyagi Station 青柳駅
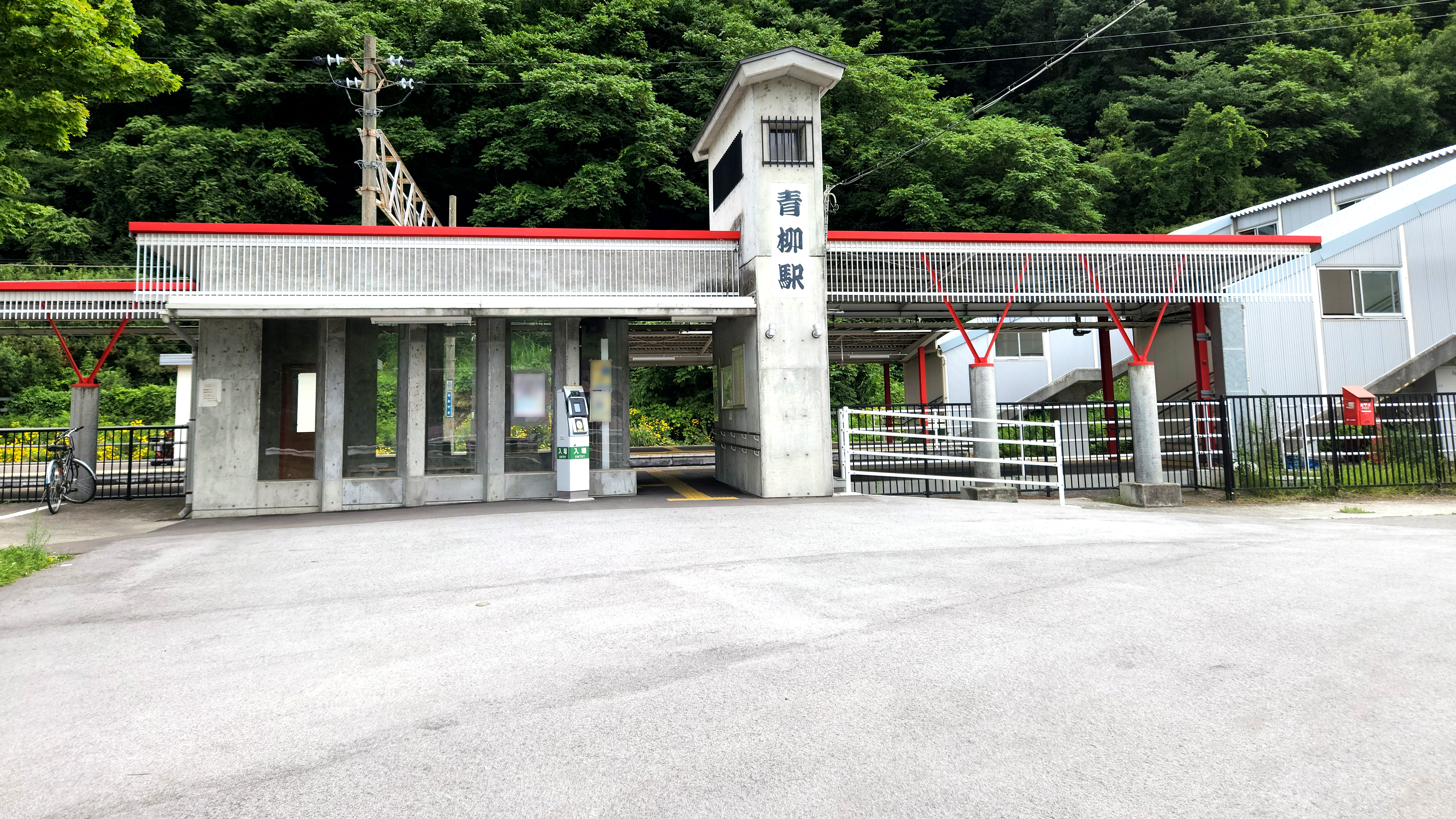
- Aoyagi Station in August 2022

General information
- Location: 2654 Kanazawa-Aoyagi, Chino-shi, Nagano-ken 391-0012; Japan
- Coordinates: 35.9427°N 138.1976°E
- Elevation: 866.9 meters
- Operator: JR East
- Line: ■ Chūō Main Line
- Distance: 188.0 km from Tokyo
- Platforms: 1 side + 1 island platform
- Tracks: 3

Other information
- Station code: CO55
- Website: Official website

History
- Opened: 25 November 1905

Passengers
- FY2011: 208

Services
Preceding station	JR East	Following station
Chino CO56 towards Shiojiri	Chūō Main Line Local	Suzurannosato CO54 towards Tachikawa
Location
- Location within Nagano Prefecture Location within Japan

Aoyagi Station (青柳駅, Aoyagi-eki) is a railway station on the Chūō Main Line in the city of Chino, Nagano, Japan, operated by East Japan Railway Company (JR East).

== Lines ==
Aoyagi Station is served by the Chūō Main Line, and is 188.0 kilometers from the terminus of the line at Tokyo Station.

== Station layout ==
The station consists of one ground level side platform and one ground level island platform, connected by a footbridge. The station is unattended.

=== Platforms ===
1	■ Chūō Main Line	for Kami-Suwa, Shiojiri, Matsumoto, and Nagano
2	■ Chūō Main Line	for Kami-Suwa, Shiojiri, Matsumoto, and Nagano for Kobuchizawa, Kōfu, Ōtsuki, and Hachiōji
3	■ Chūō Main Line	for Kobuchizawa, Kōfu, Ōtsuki, and Hachiōji

== History ==
Aoyagi Station opened on 25 November 1905. With the privatization of Japanese National Railways (JNR) on 1 April 1987, the station came under the control of JR East. Station numbering introduced on the line from February 2025, with the station being assigned number CO55.

== Surrounding area ==
- Former Kanasawa-shuku on the Kōshū Kaidō

== See also ==
- List of railway stations in Japan
