= Shinano-Kawashima Station =

Railway station in Tatsuno, Nagano Prefecture, Japan

Shinano-Kawashima Station 信濃川島駅
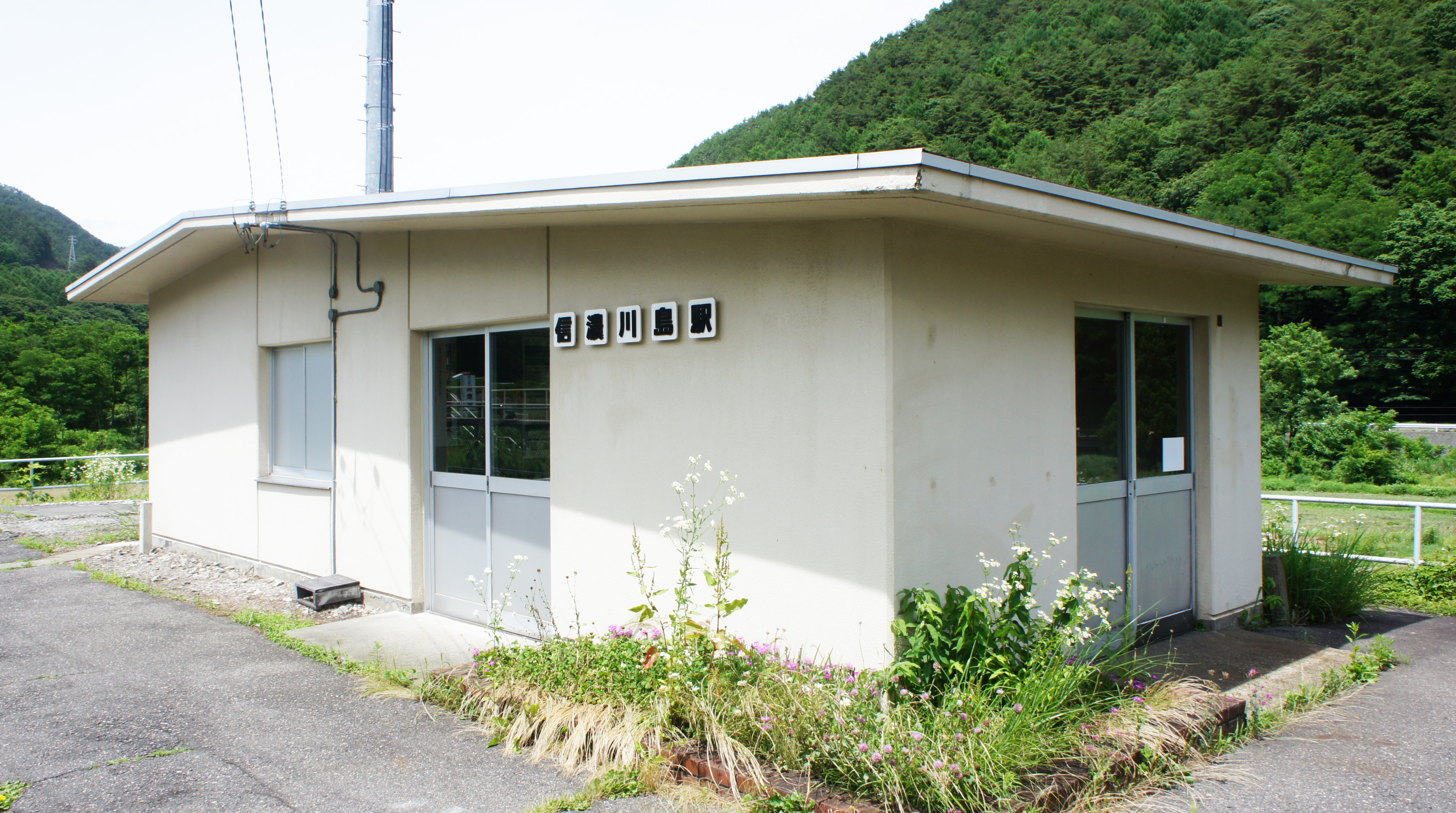
- Shinano-Kawashima Station, July 2021

General information
- Location: 1061 Kawashima, Tatsuno-machi, Kamiina-gun, Nagano-ken 399-0512; Japan
- Coordinates: 36.0135°N 137.9720°E
- Elevation: 769.9 meters
- Operator: JR East
- Line: ■ Chūō Main Line
- Distance: 13.8 km from Okaya
- Platforms: 1 side platform

Other information
- Status: Unstaffed
- Website: Official website

History
- Opened: 1 April 1955

Passengers
- FY2011: 19

Services
Preceding station	JR East	Following station
Ono towards Shiojiri	Chūō Main Line Tatsuno Branch	Tatsuno towards Okaya
Location
- Location within Nagano Prefecture Location within Japan

Shinano-Kawashima Station (信濃川島駅, Shinano-Kawashima-eki) is a railway station in the town of Tatsuno Town, Kamiina District, Nagano Prefecture, Japan, operated by East Japan Railway Company (JR East).

== Lines ==
Shinano-Kawashima Station is served by the old route of Chūō Main Line (Okaya-Shiojiri branch) and is 13.8 kilometers from the branching point of the line at Okaya Station and 224.2 kilometers from the terminus at Tokyo Station.

== Station layout ==
The station consists of one ground-level side platform serving a single bi-directional track. The station does not have station building, but only a shelter on the platform. The station is unattended.

== History ==
Shinano-Kawashima Station opened on 1 April 1955. With the privatization of Japanese National Railways (JNR) on 1 April 1987, the station came under the control of JR East.

== Passenger statistics ==
In fiscal 2011, the station was used by an average of 19 passengers daily (boarding passengers only) and was the least utilized of any station on the Chūō Main Line.

== Surrounding area ==
- National Route 153

== See also ==
- List of railway stations in Japan
