= Haba Station (Nagano) =

Railway station in Tatsuno, Nagano Prefecture, Japan

Haba Station 北殿駅
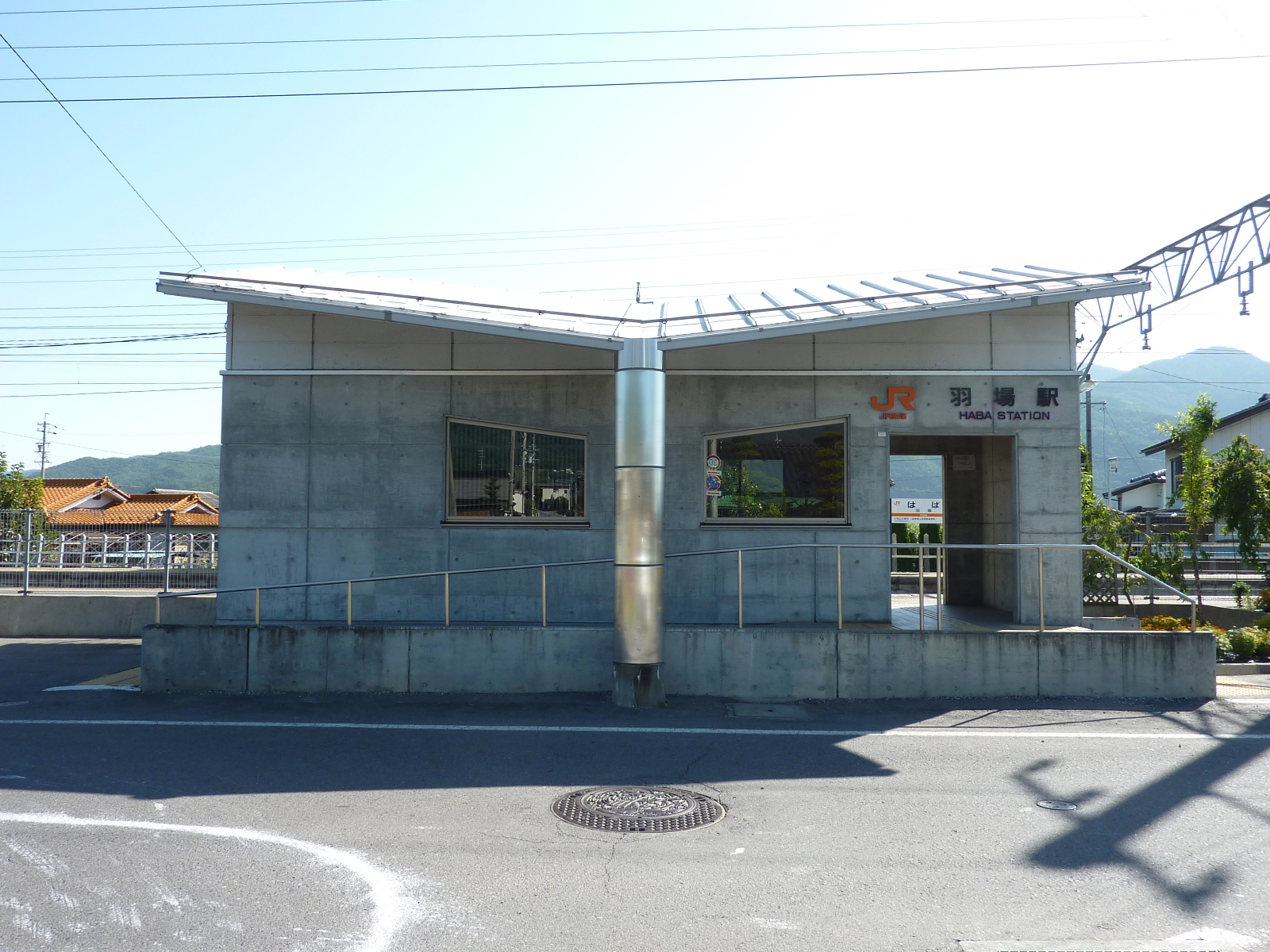
- Haba Station in September 2009

General information
- Location: 6245 Inatomi, Tatsuno-machi, Kamiina-gun, Nagano-ken 399-0428; Japan
- Coordinates: 35.953°N 137.985°E
- Elevation: 723 m (2,372 ft)
- Operator: JR Central
- Line: Iida Line
- Distance: 191.6 km from Toyohashi
- Platforms: 2 side platforms

Other information
- Status: Staffed

History
- Opened: 28 December 1909

Passengers
- FY2016: 188 (daily)
Location
- Location within Nagano Prefecture Location within Japan

Haba Station (羽場駅, Haba-eki) is a railway station on the Iida Line in the town of Tatsuno, Kamiina District, Nagano, Japan, operated by Central Japan Railway Company (JR Central).

== Lines ==
Haba Station is served by the Iida Line and is 191.6 kilometers from the starting point of the line at Toyohashi Station.

== Station layout ==
The station consists of two ground-level opposed side platforms connected by a level crossing. The station is unattended.

=== Platforms ===
1	■ Iida Line	for Tatsuno
2	■ Iida Line	for Iida and Tenryūkyō

== Adjacent stations ==
«	Service	»
Iida Line
Sawa	Rapid Misuzu	Ina-Shimmachi
Sawa	Local	Ina-Shimmachi

== History ==
Haba Station opened on 28 December 1909. With the privatization of Japanese National Railways (JNR) on 1 April 1987, the station came under the control of JR Central. The current station building was completed in 1999.

== Passenger statistics ==
In fiscal 2016, the station was used by an average of 188 passengers daily (boarding passengers only).

== Surrounding area ==
- National Route 153

== See also ==
- List of railway stations in Japan
