= Shimo-Suwa Station =

Railway station in Shimosuwa, Nagano Prefecture, Japan

CO58 Shimo-Suwa Station 下諏訪駅
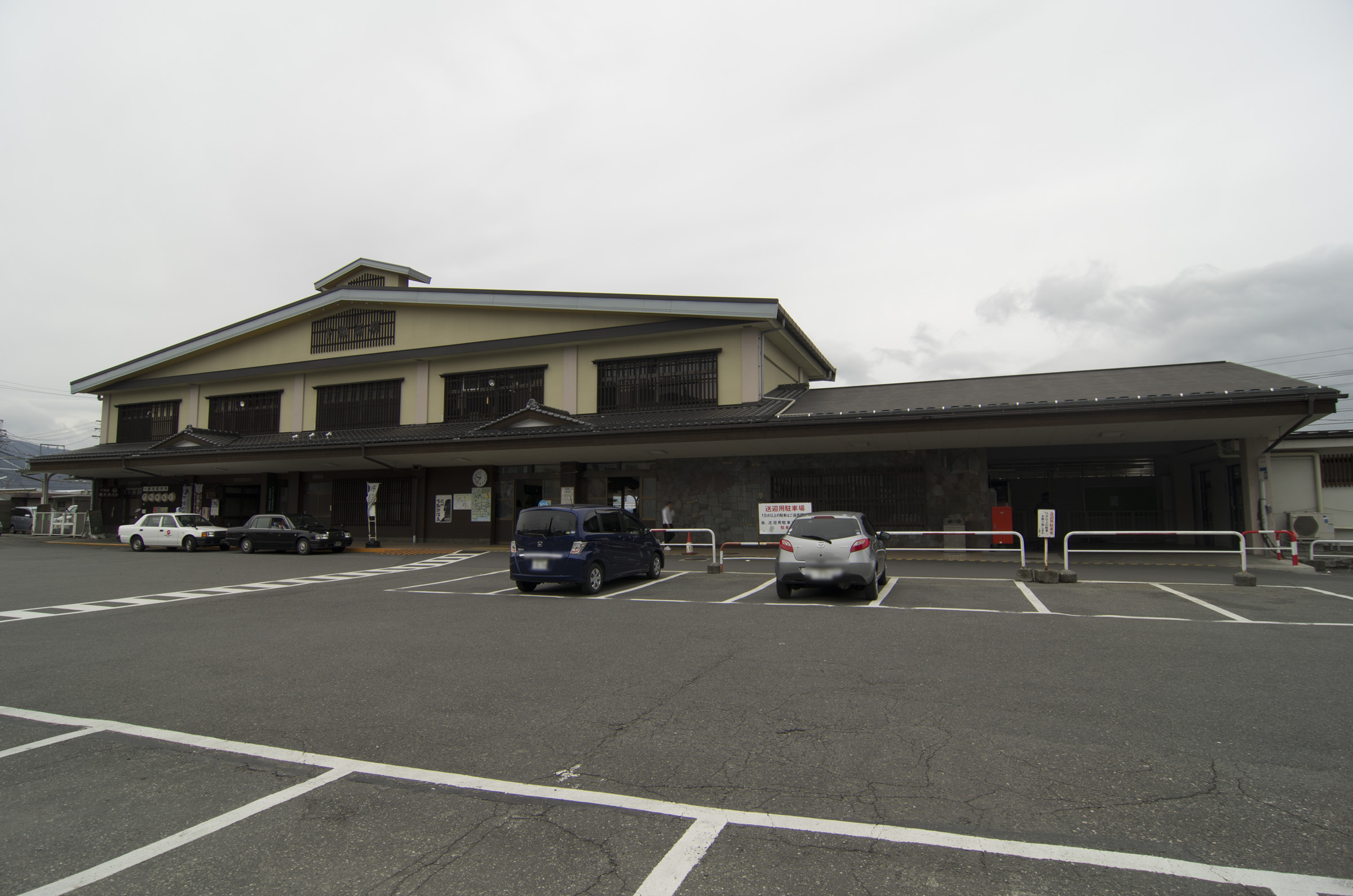
- Shimo-Suwa Station in April 2012

General information
- Location: Hirose-cho, Shimosuwa-machi, Suwa-gun, Nagano-ken 393-0056; Japan
- Coordinates: 36.0719°N 138.0851°E
- Elevation: 767.5 meters
- Operator: JR East
- Line: Chūō Main Line
- Distance: 206.3 km from Tokyo
- Platforms: 1 side + 1 island platform
- Tracks: 3

Other information
- Status: Staffed (Midori no Madoguchi )
- Station code: CO58
- Website: Official website

History
- Opened: 25 November 1905
- Rebuilt: 1993

Passengers
- FY2023: 3,542 (daily)

Services
Preceding station	JR East	Following station
Okaya CO59 towards Hakuba	Azusa	Kami-Suwa CO57 towards Chiba or Tokyo
Okaya CO59 towards Shiojiri	Chūō Main Line Local	Kami-Suwa CO57 towards Tachikawa
Location
- Location within Nagano Prefecture Location within Japan

Shimo-Suwa Station (下諏訪駅, Shimo-Suwa-eki) is a railway station on the Chuo Main Line in the town of Shimosuwa, Suwa District, Nagano Prefecture, Japan, operated by East Japan Railway Company (JR East).

== Lines ==
Shimo-Suwa Station is served by the Chūō Main Line and is 206.3 kilometers from the terminus of the line at Tokyo Station.

== Station layout ==
Shimo-Suwa Station has one side platform and one island platform serving three tracks. The station has a Midori no Madoguchi staffed ticket office.

=== Platforms ===
1	■ Chūō Main Line	for Kōfu, Shinjuku and Tokyo
2	■ Chūō Main Line	for Shiojiri and Matsumoto
3	■ Chūō Main Line	(not normally used)

== History ==
The station opened on 25 November 1905. With the privatization of Japanese National Railways (JNR) on 1 April 1987, the station came under the control of JR East. The station building was rebuilt in 1998. Station numbering introduced on the line from February 2025, with the station being assigned number CO58.

== Passenger statistics ==
In fiscal 2015, the station was used by an average of 1,982 passengers daily (boarding passengers only).

== Surrounding area ==
- Suwa taisha
- Shimosuwa Town Hall
- National Route 20

== See also ==
- List of railway stations in Japan
