= Ina-Shimmachi Station =

Railway station in Tatsuno, Nagano Prefecture, Japan

Ina-Shimmachi Station 伊那新町駅
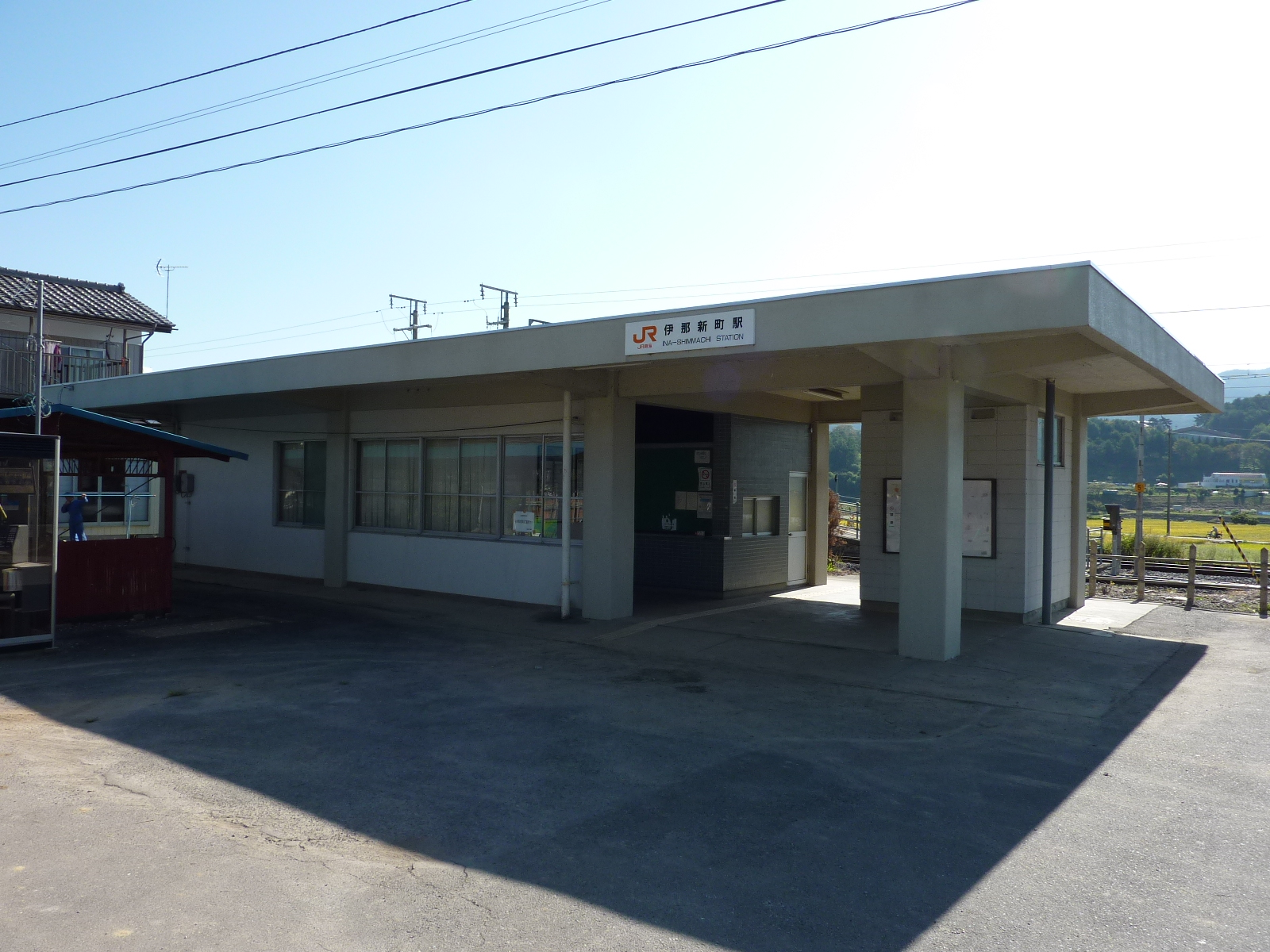
- Ina-Shimmachi Station in September 2009

General information
- Location: 4552 Inatomi, Tatsuno-machi, Kamiina-gun, Nagano-ken 399-4511; Japan
- Coordinates: 35.9687°N 137.9833°E
- Elevation: 719 meters
- Operator: JR Central
- Line: Iida Line
- Distance: 193.4 km from Toyohashi
- Platforms: 1 island platform

Other information
- Status: Unstaffed

History
- Opened: 28 December 1998
- Former names: Minami-Shimmachi (to 1943)

Passengers
- FY2016: 79 (daily)
Location
- Location within Nagano Prefecture Location within Japan

Ina-Shimmachi Station (伊那新町駅, Ina-Shimmachi-eki) is a railway station on the Iida Line in the town of Tatsuno, Kamiina District, Nagano, Japan, operated by Central Japan Railway Company (JR Central).

== Lines ==
Ina-Shimmachi Station is served by the Iida Line and is 193.4 kilometers from the starting point of the line at Toyohashi Station.

== Station layout ==
The station consists of one ground-level island platform connected to the station building by a level crossing. The station is unattended.

=== Platforms ===
1	■ Iida Line	for Tatsuno
2	■ Iida Line	for Iida and Tenryūkyō

== Adjacent stations ==
«	Service	»
Iida Line
Haba	Rapid Misuzu	Miyaki
Haba	Local	Miyaki

== History ==
The station opened on 28 December 1909 as the Minami-Shimmachi Stop (南新町停留場, Minami-Shimmachi Teiryujo). It was renamed Ina-Shimmachi on 1 August 1943. With the privatization of Japanese National Railways (JNR) on 1 April 1987, the station came under the control of JR Central.

== Passenger statistics ==
In fiscal 2016, the station was used by an average of 79 passengers daily (boarding passengers only).

== Surrounding area ==
- National Route 153
- Tenryū River

== See also ==
- List of railway stations in Japan
