= Tatsuno Station (Nagano) =

Railway station in Tatsuno, Nagano Prefecture, Japan

Tatsuno Station 辰野駅
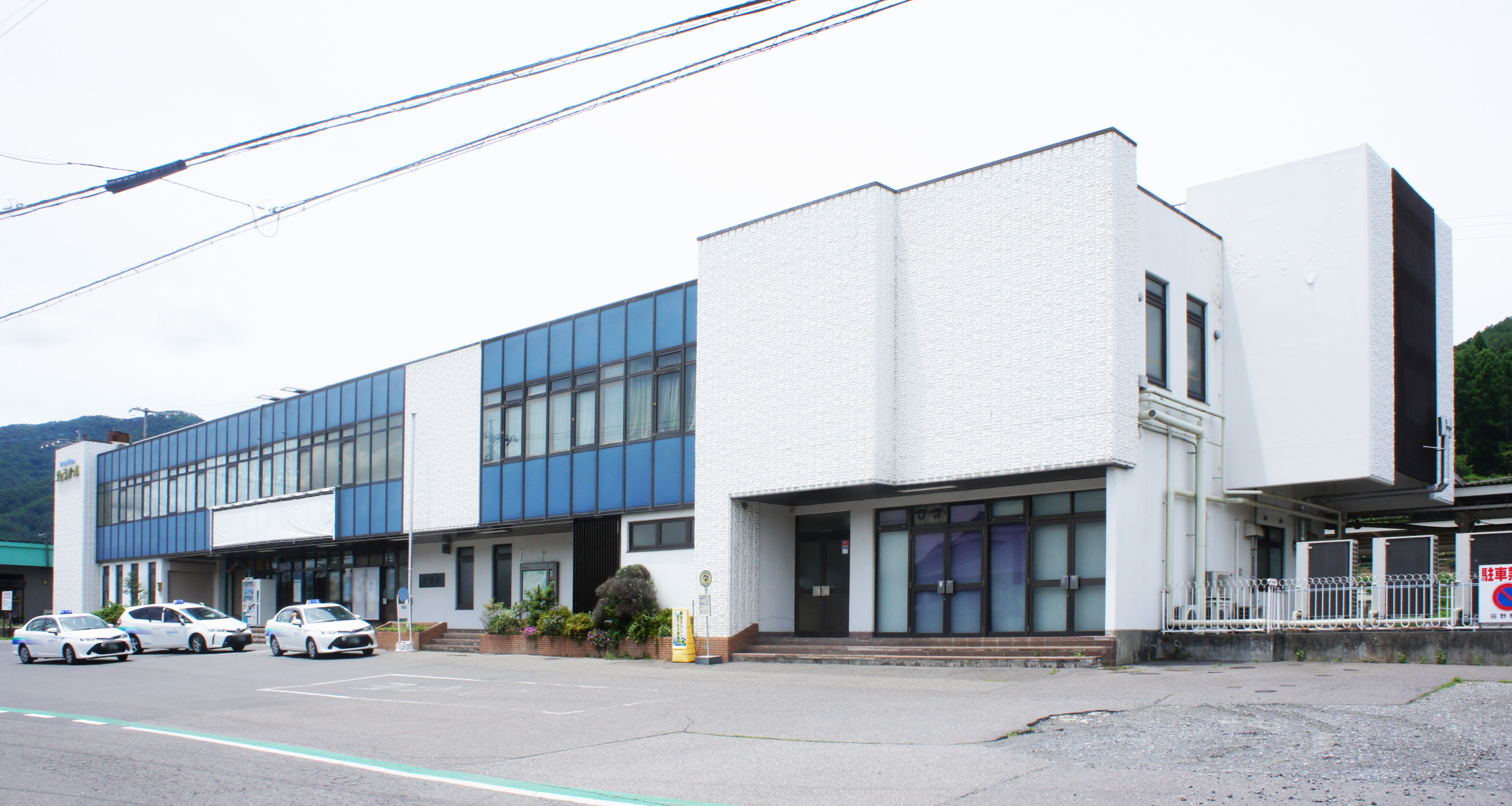
- Tatsuno Station, July 2021

General information
- Location: 1941 Tatsuno, Tatsuno Town, Kamiina District, Nagano Prefecture 399-0421; Japan
- Coordinates: 35.9839°N 137.9972°E
- Elevation: 722.8 m (2,371 ft)
- Operator: JR East
- Lines: ■Chūō Main Line; Iida Line
- Distance: 195.7 km (121.6 mi) from Toyohashi
- Platforms: 2 island platforms
- Train operators: JR East; JR Central; JR Freight

Other information
- Status: Staffed (Midori no Madoguchi )
- Website: Official website

History
- Opened: 11 June 1906

Passengers
- FY2023: 874 (daily)

Services
| Preceding station | JR East | Following station |
|---|---|---|
| Shinano-Kawashima towards Shiojiri | Chūō Main Line Tatsuno Branch | Kawagishi towards Okaya |
| Preceding station | JR Central | Following station |
| Miyaki towards Iida | Iida Line Rapid Misuzu | Kawagishi towards Okaya |
| Ina-Shimmachi One-way operation | Iida Line Rapid | Kawagishi towards Okaya |
| Miyaki towards Toyohashi | Iida Line Local | Kawagishi towards Okaya |
Location
- Location within Nagano Prefecture Location within Japan

Tatsuno Station (辰野駅, Tatsuno-eki) is a railway station in the town of Tatsuno, Kamiina District, Nagano Prefecture, Japan jointly operated by JR Central and JR East. It is managed by JR East. The station also has a freight terminal for the Japan Freight Railway Company (JR Freight).

== Lines ==
Tatsuno Station is served by the old route of Chūō Main Line (Okaya-Shiojiri branch) and is 9.5 kilometers from the branching point of the line at Okaya Station and 219.9 from the terminus at Tokyo Station. It is also a station on the Iida Line, and is 195.7 kilometers from the terminus of that line at Toyohashi Station

== Station layout ==
The station consists of two ground-level island platforms serving four tracks, connected to the station building by a footbridge. The station has a Midori no Madoguchi staffed ticket office.

=== Platforms ===
| 0 | ■ Iida Line | for Komagane, Iida and Tenryūkyō (once per day) |
| 1 | ■ Iida Line | for Komagane, Iida, Tenryūkyō and Toyohashi |
| | ■ Chūō Main Line | for Okaya and Kami-Suwa |
| 3 | ■ Chūō Main Line | for Ono, Shiojiri and Matsumoto |
| | ■ Iida Line | for Ono, Shiojiri and Matsumoto |

== History ==
The station opened on 11 June 1906. The current station building was completed in 1983. With the privatization of Japanese National Railways (JNR) on 1 April 1987, the station came under the control of JR East.

== Passenger statistics ==
In fiscal 2017, the station was used by an average of 611 passengers daily (boarding passengers only).

== Surrounding area ==
- Tatsuno Post Office
- Tenryū River

== See also ==
- List of railway stations in Japan
