= Midoriko Station =

Railway station in Shiojiri, Nagano Prefecture, Japan

CO60 Midoriko Station みどり湖駅
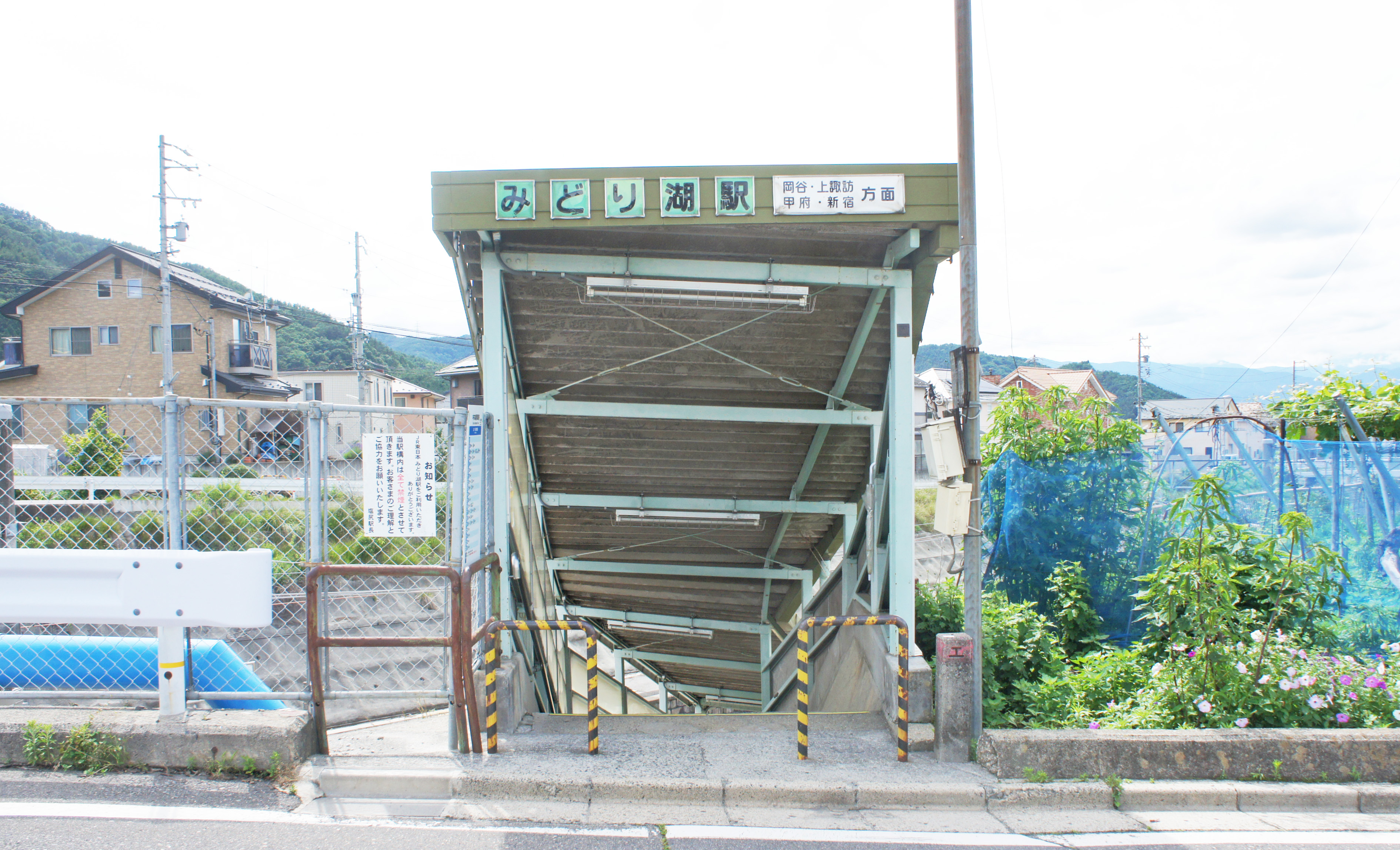
- Entrance to Midoriko Station in July 2021

General information
- Location: Saijo-michibata, Shiojiri-shi, Nagano-ken 399-0724; Japan
- Coordinates: 36°5′39.2″N 137°58′55″E
- Elevation: 760.7 m (2,496 ft)
- Operator: JR East
- Line: Chūō Main Line
- Distance: 218.2 km from Tokyo
- Platforms: 2 side platforms
- Tracks: 2

Other information
- Station code: CO60
- Website: Official website

History
- Opened: 5 July 1983

Services
| Preceding station | JR East | Following station |
|---|---|---|
| Shiojiri CO61 Terminus | Chūō Main Line Rapid Misuzu | Okaya CO59 Terminus |
| Shiojiri CO61 Terminus | Chūō Main Line Local | Okaya CO59 towards Tachikawa |
Location
- Location within Nagano Prefecture Location within Japan

Midoriko Station (みどり湖駅, Midoriko-eki) is a railway station on the Chuo Main Line in Shiojiri, Nagano, Japan, operated by East Japan Railway Company (JR East).

== Lines ==
Midoriko Station is served by the Chuo Main Line and is 218.2 kilometers from the terminus of the line at Tokyo Station.

== Station layout ==
The station consists of two side platforms serving two tracks, located in a cutting below ground level.

=== Platforms ===
| north | ■ Chuo Main Line | for Okaya and Kobuchizawa |
| south | ■ Chuo Main Line | for Shiojiri, Matsumoto, and Nagano |

== History ==
Midoriko Station opened on 5 July 1983, coinciding with the opening of the Enrei Tunnel (塩嶺トンネル). Station numbering introduced on the line from February 2025, with the station being assigned number CO60.

== Surrounding area ==
- Shiojiri-shuku
- National Route 20
- National Route 153

== See also ==
- List of railway stations in Japan
