= Jinryō Station =

Railway station in Kasugai, Aichi Prefecture, Japan

CF08 Jinryō Station 神領駅
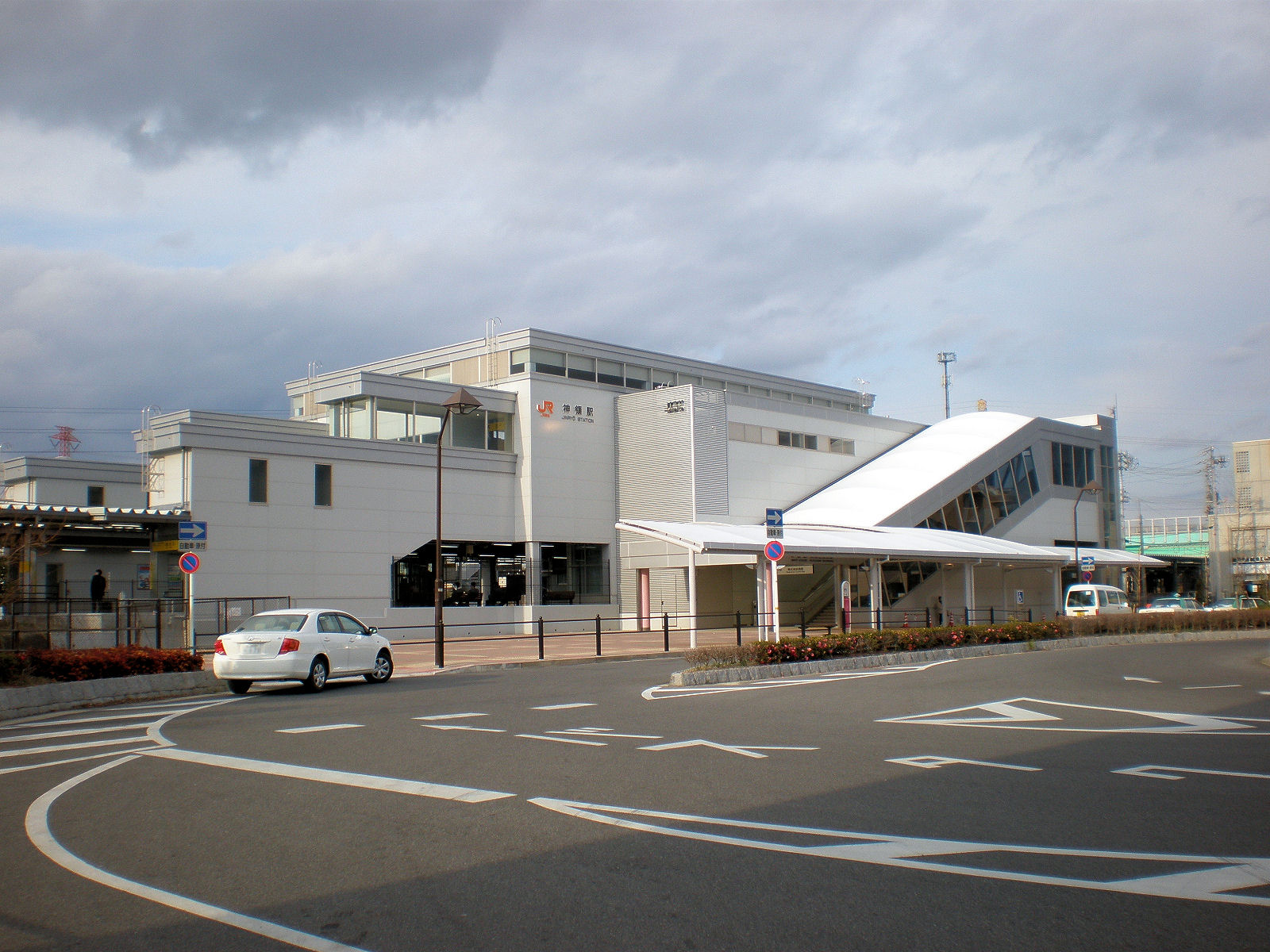
- Jinryō Station, South exit in February 2009

General information
- Location: 571 Jinryōchō, Kasugai-shi, Aichi-ken 486-0821; Japan
- Coordinates: 35°15′24″N 137°0′39″E
- Operator: JR Central
- Line: Chūō Main Line
- Distance: 376.1 kilometers from Tokyo
- Platforms: 1 side + 1 island platform

Other information
- Status: Staffed
- Station code: CF08
- Website: Official website

History
- Opened: 15 December 1951; 74 years ago

Passengers
- FY2017: 13,443 daily
Location
- Location within Aichi Prefecture Location within Japan

Track diagram

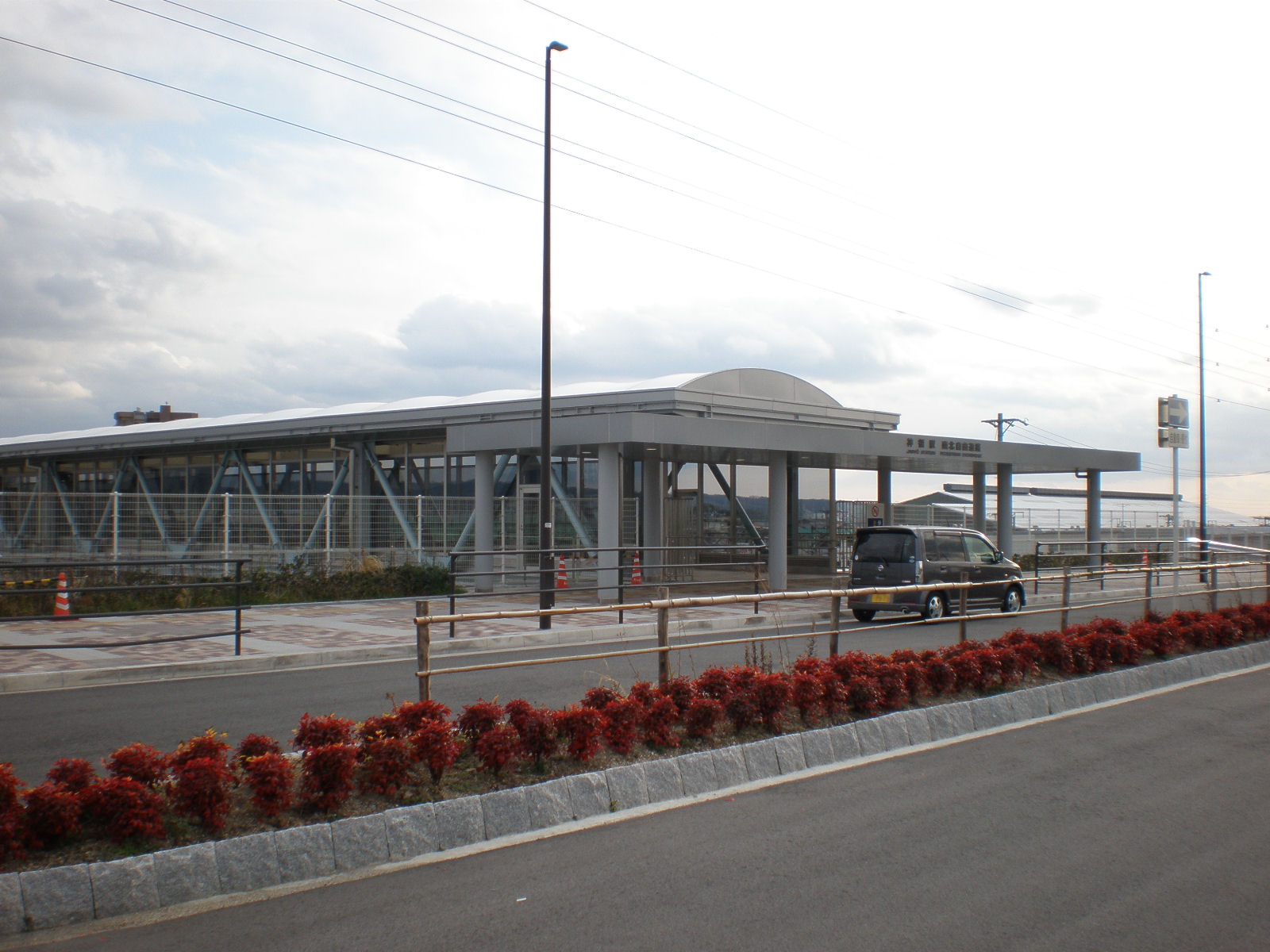
North exit

Jinryō Station (神領駅, Jinryō-eki) is a railway station in the city of Kasugai, Aichi Prefecture, Japan, operated by Central Japan Railway Company (JR Tōkai).

== Lines ==
Jinryō Station is served by the Chūō Main Line, and is located 376.1 kilometers from the starting point of the line at Tokyo Station and 20.8 kilometers from Nagoya Station.

== Station layout ==
The station has one side platform and one island platforms connected by a footbridge, with an elevated station building. The station building has automated ticket machines, TOICA automated turnstiles and a staffed ticket office.

=== Platforms ===
1	■ Chūō Main Line	For Nagoya
2	■ Chūō Main Line	For Tajimi, Nakatsugawa
3	■ Chūō Main Line	For Nagoya (starting trains only)

== Adjacent stations ==
«	Service	»
JR Central
Chūō Main Line
Home Liner: Does not stop at this station
Central Liner: Does not stop at this station
Rapid: Does not stop at this station
Kōzōji	Local	Kasugai

== Station history ==
Jinryō Station began as the Jinryō Signal Stop (神領信号場) on October 1, 1943. It was upgraded to the Jinryō Provisional Stop (神領仮停車場) on July 12, 1949 and to a full passenger station on December 15, 1951. Along with the division and privatization of JNR on April 1, 1987, the station came under the control and operation of the Central Japan Railway Company. A new station building was completed in March 2008.

== Passenger statistics ==
In fiscal 2017, the station was used by an average of 13,443 passengers daily (arriving passengers only).

== Surrounding area ==
- Chubu University
- Moriyama High School

== See also ==
- List of railway stations in Japan
