= Miyaki Station =

Railway station in Tatsuno, Nagano Prefecture, Japan

Miyaki Station 宮木駅
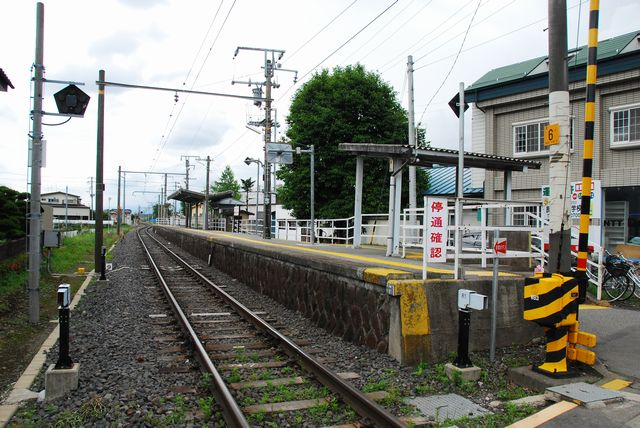
- Miyaki Station in June 2008

General information
- Location: 2605 Inatomi, Tatsuno-machi, Kamiina-gun, Nagano-ken 399-0428; Japan
- Coordinates: 35.9761°N 137.9901°E
- Elevation: 720 meters
- Operator: JR Central
- Line: Iida Line
- Distance: 194.6 km from Toyohashi
- Platforms: 1 side platform
- Tracks: 1

Other information
- Status: Unstaffed

History
- Opened: 3 November 1911

Passengers
- FY2016: 575 (daily)
Location
- Location within Nagano Prefecture Location within Japan

Miyaki Station (宮木駅, Miyaki-eki) is a railway station on the Iida Line in the town of Tatsuno, Kamiina District, Nagano, Japan, operated by Central Japan Railway Company (JR Central).

== Lines ==
Miyaki Station is served by the Iida Line and is 194.6 kilometers from the starting point of the line at Toyohashi Station.

== Station layout ==
The station consists of one ground-level side platform serving a single bi-directional track. There is no station building, but only a shelter built on top of the platform. The station is unattended.

== Adjacent stations ==
«	Service	»
Iida Line
Ina-Shimmachi	Rapid Misuzu	Tatsuno
Ina-Shimmachi	Local	Tatsuno

== History ==
Miyaki Station opened on 28 December 1909. With the privatization of Japanese National Railways (JNR) on 1 April 1987, the station came under the control of JR Central.

== Passenger statistics ==
In fiscal 2016, the station was used by an average of 575 passengers daily (boarding passengers only).

== Surrounding area ==
- Tenryū River

== See also ==
- List of railway stations in Japan
