= Chūō Main Line =

Railway line in Japan

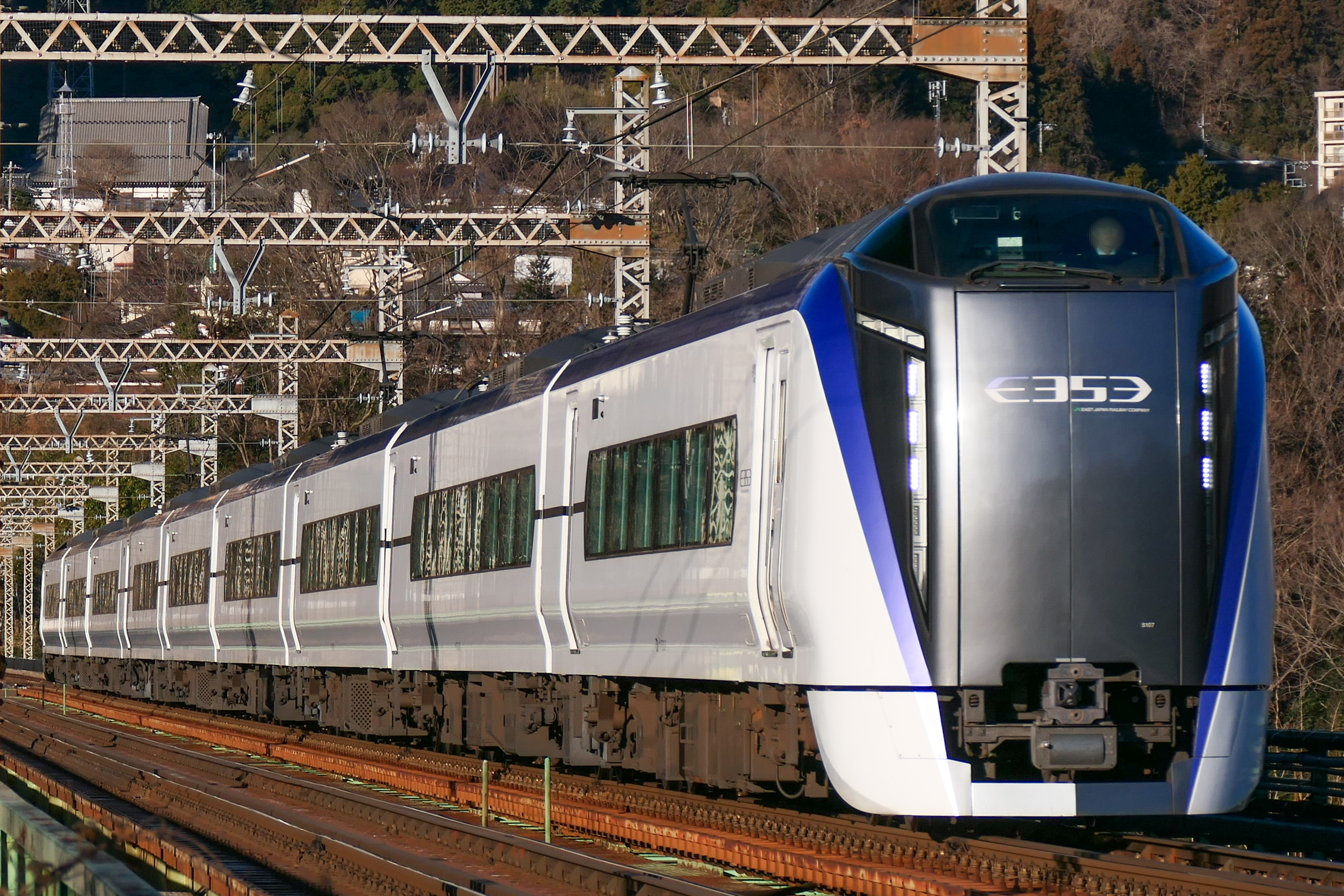
- E353 Series limited express on the Chūō Main Line

Overview
- Native name: 中央本線
- Locale: Tokyo, Kanagawa, Yamanashi, Nagano, Gifu, Aichi prefectures
- Termini: Tokyo; Nagoya
- Stations: 112

Service
- Type: Heavy rail, Passenger/Freight Rail; Intercity rail, Regional rail, Commuter rail
- Operator(s): JR East, JR Central

History
- Opened: 11 April 1889; 137 years ago (Shinjuku–Tachikawa)

Technical
- Line length: 424.6 km (263.8 mi)
- Track gauge: 1,067 mm (3 ft 6 in)
- Electrification: 1,500 V DC (Overhead lines)
- Operating speed: 130 km/h (81 mph)
- Maximum incline: 2.5%
Route map
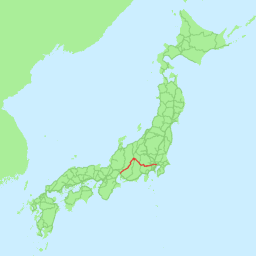

The Chūō Main Line (Japanese: 中央本線, Hepburn: Chūō-honsen), commonly called the Chūō Line, is one of the major trunk railway lines in Japan. It connects Tokyo and Nagoya, although it is the slowest direct railway connection between the two cities; the coastal Tōkaidō Main Line is slightly faster, and the Tōkaidō Shinkansen is currently the fastest rail link between the cities.

The eastern portion, the Chūō East Line (中央東線, Chūō-tōsen), is operated by the East Japan Railway Company (JR East), while the western portion, the Chūō West Line (中央西線, Chūō-saisen), is operated by the Central Japan Railway Company (JR Central). The dividing point between the two companies is Shiojiri, where express trains from both operators continue north onto the Shinonoi Line towards the cities of Matsumoto and Nagano. Compared to the huge urban areas at either end of the Chūō Line, its central portion is lightly traveled; the Shiojiri-Nakatsugawa corridor is only served by one limited express and one local service per hour.

The Chūō Main Line passes through the mountainous center of Honshu. Its highest point (near Fujimi) is about 900 meters (3,000 ft) above sea level and much of the line has a gradient of 25 per mil (2.5% or 1 in 40). Along the Chūō East Line section, peaks of the Akaishi and Kiso as well as Mount Yatsugatake can be seen from trains. The Chūō West Line parallels the old Nakasendō highway (famous for the preserved post towns of Tsumago-juku and Magome-juku) and the steep Kiso Valley.

== Routes ==
- Entire Route (Tokyo - Nagoya including branch): 424.6 km (263.8 mi)
- East Line (Tokyo - Shiojiri): 222.1 km (138.0 mi)
  - Tokyo - Kanda: 1.3 km (0.81 mi) (officially part of the Tōhoku Main Line)
  - Kanda - Yoyogi: 8.3 km (5.2 mi)
  - Yoyogi - Shinjuku: 0.7 km (0.43 mi) (officially part of the Yamanote Line)
  - Shinjuku - Shiojiri: 211.8 km (131.6 mi)
- East Line - Tatsuno branch line (Okaya - Tatsuno - Shiojiri): 27.7 km (17.2 mi)
- West Line (Shiojiri - Nagoya): 174.8 km (108.6 mi)
  - Shiojiri - Kanayama: 171.5 km (106.6 mi)
  - Kanayama - Nagoya: 3.3 km (2.1 mi) (alongside Tōkaidō Main Line)

== Stations and services ==
This section lists all stations on the Chūō Main Line and generally explains regional services on the line. In addition, there are limited express services connecting major cities along the line, namely Azusa, Super Azusa, Kaiji, Hamakaiji, Narita Express and Shinano. For details of the limited express trains, see the relevant articles.

=== Tokyo - Mitaka ===
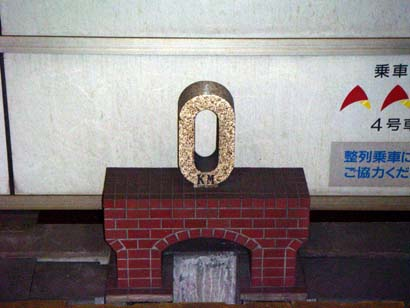
0 kilometer post at Tokyo Station for the Chūō Main Line near Car 4.

The section between Tokyo and Mitaka is grade-separated, with no level crossings. Between Ochanomizu and Mitaka, the Chūō Main Line has four tracks; two of them are local tracks (緩行線, kankō-sen) with platforms at every station; the other two are rapid tracks (快速線, kaisoku-sen) with some stations without platforms. The local tracks are used by the Chūō-Sōbu Line local trains, while the rapid tracks carry rapid service and limited express trains. The Tokyo-Mitaka portion is a vital cross-city rail link.

The commuter services on the rapid tracks are collectively called the Chūō Line (Rapid) in comparison with the Chūō Line (Local) (中央線各駅停車, Chūō-sen-kakuekiteisha) or the Chūō-Sōbu Line on the local tracks. The former is usually referred to simply as the Chūō Line and the latter the Sōbu Line. Separate groups of trainsets are used for these two groups of services: cars with an orange belt for the rapid service trains and cars with a yellow belt for the local service trains. Signs at stations also use these colors to indicate the services.

This section is located entirely within Tokyo.

=== Mitaka - Takao ===
The four-track section ends at Mitaka. Most of the section between Mitaka and Tachikawa had been elevated between 2008 and 2011 to eliminate level crossings. Plans have been proposed to add another two tracks as far as Tachikawa, but were not included in the track elevation.

=== Takao - Shiojiri ===
Most of the rapid service trains from Tokyo terminate at Takao, where the line exits the large urban area of Tokyo. The section between Takao and Ōtsuki still carries some commuter trains as well as long distance local trains and Limited Express trains. The Kaiji limited express terminates at Kōfu, the capital of Yamanashi Prefecture, while the Azusa continue beyond Shiojiri to Matsumoto via the Shinonoi Line.

All stations from Takao to Shiojiri are served by the Chūō Main Line Local. Local trains from Takao run as far as Matsumoto or even Nagano.

Legends:

- ●: All trains stop
- ▲: Stop, eastbound services only
- ▼: Stop, westbound services only

Station No.	Name	Japanese	Distance (km)		Chūō Main Line Local	Rapid	Comm. Rapid	Chūō Special Rapid	Comm. Special Rapid	Transfers	Location	
Station No.	Name	Japanese	Between stations	Total						Transfers	Location	
Through service to Chūō Line (Rapid) for:					Tachikawa	Tachikawa, Shinjuku and Tokyo						
JC24	Takao	高尾	3.3	53.1	●	●	▼	●	▲	Chūō Line (Rapid); Keiō Takao Line	Hachiōji	Tokyo
JC25	Sagamiko	相模湖	9.5	62.6	●	●	▼	●	▲		Sagamihara	Kanagawa
JC26	Fujino	藤野	3.7	66.3	●	●	▼	●	▲		Sagamihara	Kanagawa
JC27	Uenohara	上野原	3.5	69.8	●	●	▼	●	▲		Uenohara	Yamanashi
JC28	Shiotsu	四方津	4.2	74.0	●	●	▼	●	▲		Uenohara	Yamanashi
JC29	Yanagawa	梁川	3.6	77.6	●	●	▼	●	▲		Ōtsuki	Yamanashi
JC30	Torisawa	鳥沢	3.6	81.2	●	●	▼	●	▲		Ōtsuki	Yamanashi
JC31	Saruhashi	猿橋	4.1	85.3	●	●	▼	●	▲		Ōtsuki	Yamanashi
JC32	Ōtsuki	大月	2.5	87.8	●	●	▼	●	▲	■ Fujikyuko Line (some through trains to/from Kawaguchiko)	Ōtsuki	Yamanashi
Through service to:					Chūō Main Line for Kōfu (see below)	Some to Fujikyuko Line for Kawaguchiko			/			

Station numbers were introduced through Shiojiri in February 2025.

Station No.	Station	Japanese	Distance (km)	Transfers	Location	
JC32	Ōtsuki	大月	87.8	■ Fujikyuko Line	Ōtsuki	Yamanashi
CO33	Hatsukari	初狩	93.9		Ōtsuki	Yamanashi
CO34	Sasago	笹子	100.4		Ōtsuki	Yamanashi
CO35	Kai-Yamato	甲斐大和	106.5		Kōshū	Yamanashi
CO36	Katsunuma-budōkyō	勝沼ぶどう郷	112.5		Kōshū	Yamanashi
CO37	Enzan	塩山	116.9		Kōshū	Yamanashi
CO38	Higashi-Yamanashi	東山梨	120.1		Yamanashi	Yamanashi
CO39	Yamanashishi	山梨市	122.2		Yamanashi	Yamanashi
CO40	Kasugaichō	春日居町	125.0		Fuefuki	Yamanashi
CO41	Isawa-onsen	石和温泉	127.8		Fuefuki	Yamanashi
CO42	Sakaori	酒折	131.2		Kōfu	Yamanashi
CO43	Kōfu	甲府	134.1	■ Minobu Line	Kōfu	Yamanashi
CO44	Ryūō	竜王	138.6		Kai	Yamanashi
CO45	Shiozaki	塩崎	142.7		Kai	Yamanashi
CO46	Nirasaki	韮崎	147.0		Nirasaki	Yamanashi
CO47	Shimpu	新府	151.2		Nirasaki	Yamanashi
CO48	Anayama	穴山	154.7		Nirasaki	Yamanashi
CO49	Hinoharu	日野春	160.1		Hokuto	Yamanashi
CO50	Nagasaka	長坂	166.3		Hokuto	Yamanashi
CO51	Kobuchizawa	小淵沢	173.7	■ Koumi Line	Hokuto	Yamanashi
CO52	Shinano-Sakai	信濃境	178.2		Fujimi	Nagano
CO53	Fujimi	富士見	182.9		Fujimi	Nagano
CO54	Suzurannosato	すずらんの里	186.1		Fujimi	Nagano
CO55	Aoyagi	青柳	188.0		Chino	Nagano
CO56	Chino	茅野	195.2		Chino	Nagano
	Fumonji Junction	普門寺信号場	(198.9)		Suwa	Nagano
CO57	Kami-Suwa	上諏訪	201.9		Suwa	Nagano
CO58	Shimo-Suwa	下諏訪	206.3		Shimosuwa	Nagano
CO59	Okaya	岡谷	210.4	Chūō Line (For Tatsuno)	Okaya	Nagano
CO60	Midoriko	みどり湖	218.2		Shiojiri	Nagano
CO61	Shiojiri	塩尻	222.1	Chūō Line (for Tatsuno); Shinonoi Line; Chūō Line (for Kiso-Fukushima and Nagoya)	Shiojiri	Nagano

==== Okaya – Shiojiri ====
The Okaya-Shiojiri branch is an old route of the Chūō Main Line. It carries a small number of shuttle trains and trains from/to the Iida Line, which branches off at Tatsuno.

Station	Japanese	Distance (km)	Transfers	Location	
Okaya	岡谷	210.4	Chūō Line (for Kami-Suwa, Midoriko)	Okaya	Nagano
Kawagishi	川岸	213.9		Okaya	Nagano
Tatsuno	辰野	219.9	Iida Line	Tatsuno	Nagano
Shinano-Kawashima	信濃川島	224.2		Tatsuno	Nagano
Ono	小野	228.2		Tatsuno	Nagano
Shiojiri	塩尻	238.1	Chūō Line (for Midoriko); Shinonoi Line; Chūō Line (for Kiso-Fukushima)	Shiojiri	Nagano

Prior to the opening of the new route between Okaya and Shiojiri, there was a junction (Higashi-Shiojiri Junction (東塩尻信号場)) between Ono and Shiojiri stations. It had a reversing layout. The signal station was closed on 12 October 1983.

=== Shiojiri - Nakatsugawa ===
Shiojiri is the dividing point of the East Line and the West Line; no train continues from one to the other. The Shinano limited express is the main service for the rural Shiojiri-Nakatsugawa section.

No.	Station	Japanese	Distance	Transfers	Location	
	Shiojiri	塩尻	222.1	Chūō Line (for Midoriko, Tatsuno); Shinonoi Line	Shiojiri	Nagano
	Seba	洗馬	226.3		Shiojiri	Nagano
	Hideshio	日出塩	231.0		Shiojiri	Nagano
	Niekawa	贄川	236.2		Shiojiri	Nagano
	Kiso-Hirasawa	木曽平沢	241.4		Shiojiri	Nagano
	Narai	奈良井	243.2		Shiojiri	Nagano
	Yabuhara	藪原	249.8		Kiso (village)	Nagano
	Miyanokoshi	宮ノ越	255.5		Kiso (town)	Nagano
	Harano	原野	258.3		Kiso (town)	Nagano
CF30	Kiso-Fukushima	木曽福島	263.8		Kiso (town)	Nagano
CF29	Agematsu	上松	271.1		Agematsu	Nagano
	Kuramoto	倉本	277.7		Agematsu	Nagano
	Suhara	須原	282.5		Ōkuwa	Nagano
	Ōkuwa	大桑	285.8		Ōkuwa	Nagano
	Nojiri	野尻	288.8		Ōkuwa	Nagano
	Jūnikane	十二兼	292.5		Nagiso	Nagano
CF23	Nagiso	南木曽	298.0		Nagiso	Nagano
	Tadachi	田立	304.3		Nagiso	Nagano
	Sakashita	坂下	307.1		Nakatsugawa	Gifu
	Ochiaigawa	落合川	313.2		Nakatsugawa	Gifu
CF19	Nakatsugawa	中津川	317.0	Chūō Line (for Tajimi, Nagoya)	Nakatsugawa	Gifu

=== Nakatsugawa - Nagoya ===
Local and rapid service trains run on the line from Nakatsugawa to Nagoya. This section carries urban traffic for the Greater Nagoya Area.

Local trains stop at all stations (except Sannō Junction).

Legends:

- ● : All trains stop
- | ↓ ↑ : All trains pass (Arrows indicate the passing direction)
- ▼ : Only southbound trains stop
- ▲ : Only northbound trains stop

No.	Station	Japanese	Distance (km)	Stops				Transfers	Location	
No.	Station	Japanese	Distance (km)	Rapid	Home Liner			Transfers	Location	
No.	Station	Japanese	Distance (km)	Rapid	Tajimi	Mizunami	Nakatsugawa	Transfers	City / Town	Prefecture
CF19	Nakatsugawa	中津川	317.0	●			●	Chūō Line (for Kiso-Fukushima and Shiojiri)	Nakatsugawa	Gifu
CF18	Mino-Sakamoto	美乃坂本	323.4	●			↑		Nakatsugawa	Gifu
CF17	Ena	恵那	328.6	●			●	Akechi Railroad Akechi Line	Ena	Gifu
CF16	Takenami	武並	334.0	●			↑		Ena	Gifu
CF15	Kamado	釜戸	339.4	●			↑		Mizunami	Gifu
CF14	Mizunami	瑞浪	346.8	●		●	●		Mizunami	Gifu
CF13	Tokishi	土岐市	353.7	●		●	●		Toki	Gifu
CF12	Tajimi	多治見	360.7	●	●	●	●	Taita Line	Tajimi	Gifu
CF11	Kokokei	古虎渓	365.3	|	↓	|	↑		Tajimi	Gifu
CF10	Jōkōji	定光寺	368.8	|	↓	|	↑		Kasugai	Aichi
CF09	Kōzōji	高蔵寺	372.9	●	●	▼	↑	Aichi Loop Line	Kasugai	Aichi
CF08	Jinryō	神領	376.1	|	↓	|	↑		Kasugai	Aichi
CF07	Kasugai	春日井	378.8	●	↓	|	↑		Kasugai	Aichi
CF06	Kachigawa	勝川	381.9	●	↓	|	↑	JR-Central Transport Service Jōhoku Line	Kasugai	Aichi
CF05	Shin-Moriyama	新守山	384.6	|	↓	|	↑		Nagoya	Aichi
CF04	Ōzone	大曽根	387.1	●	↓	●	●	ST Meitetsu Seto Line Meijō Line Nagoya Guideway Bus Yutorito Line	Nagoya	Aichi
CF03	Chikusa	千種	389.8	●	●	●	●	Higashiyama Line	Nagoya	Aichi
CF02	Tsurumai	鶴舞	391.3	●	↓	▲	●	Tsurumai Line	Nagoya	Aichi
CF01	Kanayama	金山	393.6	●	●	●	●	Tōkaidō Main Line NH Meitetsu Nagoya Main Line Meijō Line Meikō Line	Nagoya	Aichi
	Sannō Junction	山王信号場	395.1	|	↓	|	↑	JR Freight Nagoyaminato Branch	Nagoya	Aichi
CF00	Nagoya	名古屋	396.9	●	●	●	●	Tōkaidō Shinkansen Tōkaidō Main Line Kansai Main Line Higashiyama Line Sakura-dōri Line Aonami Line NH Meitetsu Nagoya Main Line (at Meitetsu Nagoya) E Kintetsu Nagoya Line (at Kintetsu Nagoya)	Nagoya	Aichi

=== Junctions ===
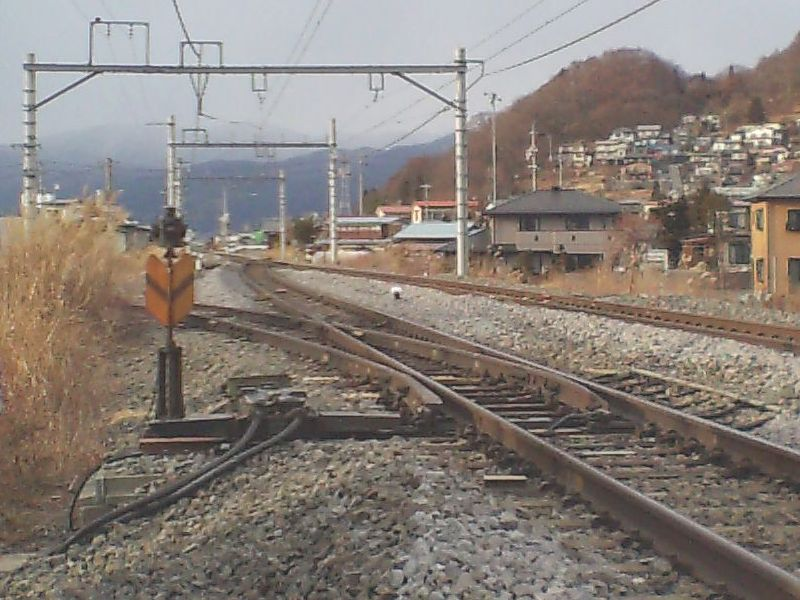
Fumonji Junction

- Fumonji Junction (普門寺信号場, Fumonji Shingōjō) is a junction between Chino and Kami-Suwa stations in Suwa, Nagano. It entered into use on 2 September 1970.
- Sannō Junction (山王信号場, Sannō Shingōjō) is a junction that diverts freight traffic from the Chūō Main Line to the Tōkaidō Line freight branch between Kanayama and Nagoya stations in Nagoya. It entered into use on 10 October 1962.

== Rolling stock ==
=== Chūō East Line (JR East) ===
New E233 series trains entered service on Tokyo-area commuter services from 26 December 2006. These trains are a development of the E231 series used on other commuter lines in the Tokyo area, and replaced the aging 201 series rolling stock introduced on the line in 1981.

From 2017, new E353 series EMUs were introduced on Azusa and Super Azusa limited express services, replacing the E351 and E257 series trains.

From 2021, E259 series EMUs on Narita Express services to and from Takao ceased operations.

- Chūō Rapid Line
  - E233 series
  - 209-1000 series
- Chūō-Sōbu Line
  - E231 series
  - E231-500 series
- Tokyo Metro Tōzai Line
  - E231-800 series
  - 05 series
  - 07 series
  - 15000 series
- Chūō Main Line Local trains
  - 211 series
  - E127 series
- Limited Express
  - E353 series (Azusa, Kaiji, Fuji Excursion, Hachiōji, Ōme)
- Seasonal services
  - 185 series (Hamakaiji)
  - 215 series (Holiday Rapid View Yamanashi)
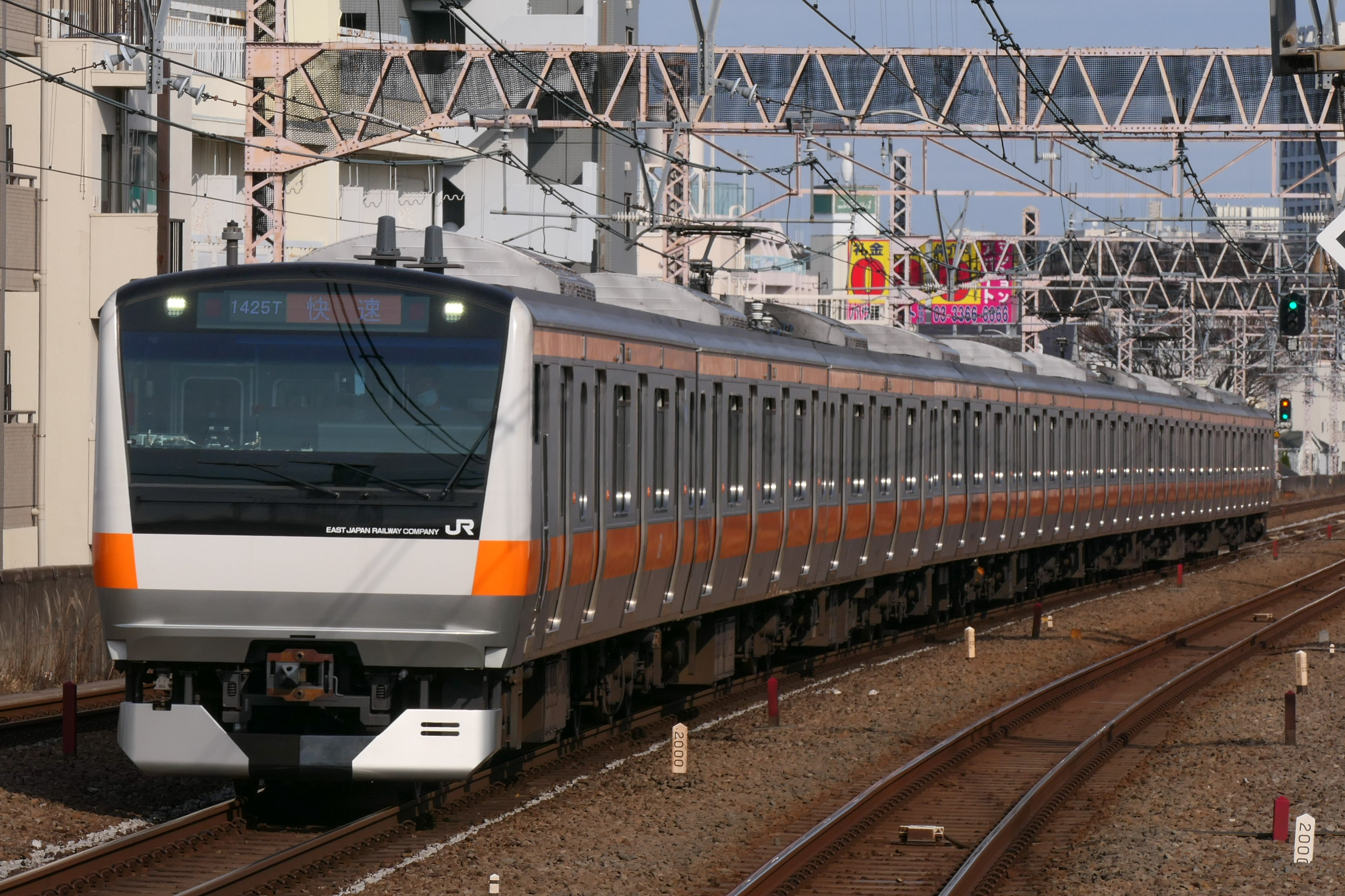
E233 series

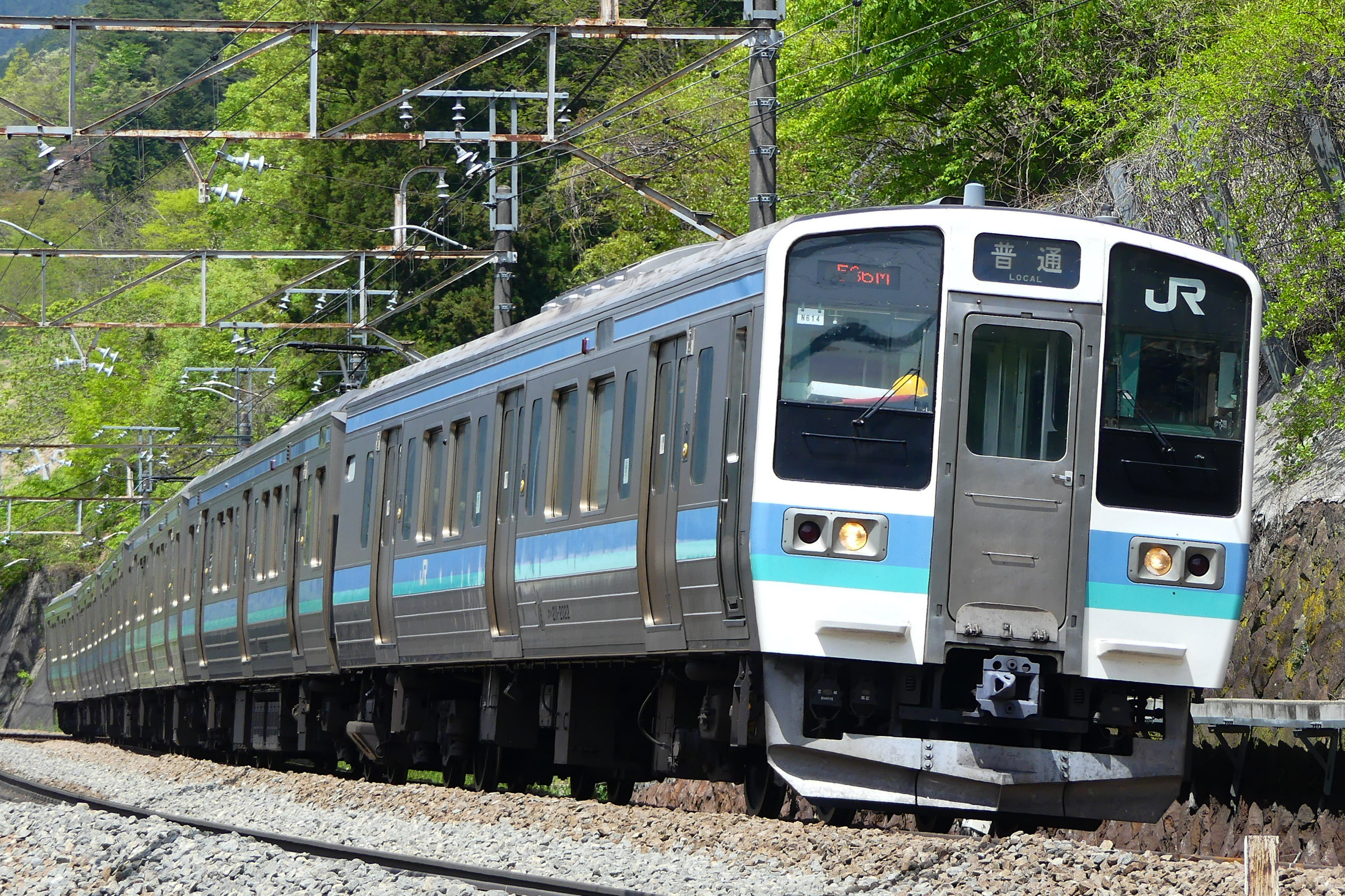
211 series

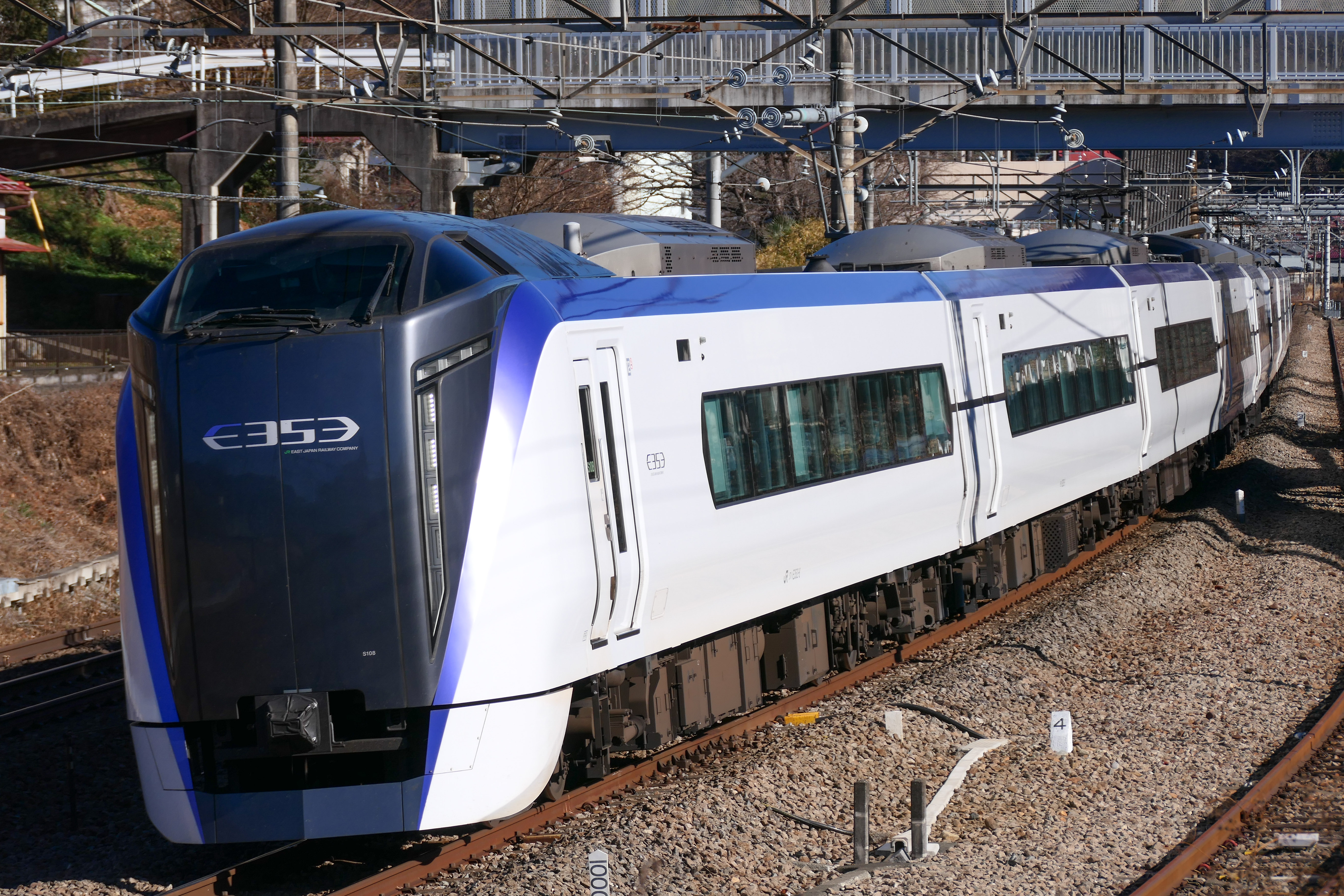
E353 series on a Azusa service

=== Chūō West Line (JR Central) ===
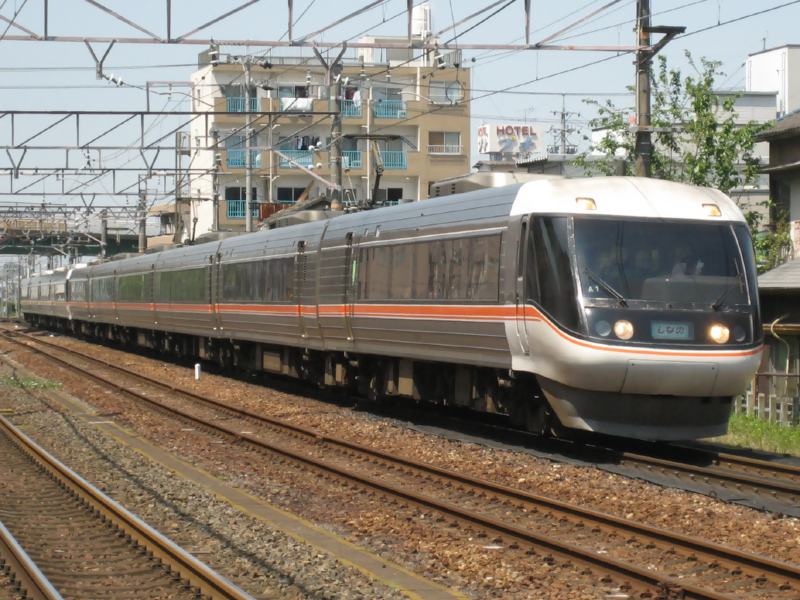
383 series trainset on a Shinano service

- Local Trains
  - 211 series
  - 213 series
  - 311 series
  - 313 series
  - 315 series
- Limited Express
  - 383 series (Shinano)

=== Freight train ===
- JR Freight Class EH200

== History ==
Inside a Chūō Main Line train in 1960

The Kobu Railway (甲武鉄道) opened the initial section of the Chūō Line from Shinjuku Station to Tachikawa Station in 1889. The company then extended the line both westward and eastward (towards Tokyo) until it was nationalised in 1906. The Japanese Government Railways (JGR) then continued to extend the line, reaching Shiojiri the same year, and Tokyo (at Shōheibashi Station (昌平橋駅)) in 1908. The JGR also built the line from Nagoya, the first section opening in 1900, with the lines connecting in 1911. The Table below gives the section opening dates.

In 1904, the section between Iidamachi Station (formerly located between Suidōbashi Station and Iidabashi Station) and Nakano Station was the first urban electric railway in Japan using 600 V DC. Electrification was extended in 1919 and 1922, was increased to 1,200 V DC when extended to Tokyo in 1927, boosted again to 1,500 V DC in 1929, and reached Kofu in 1931. Electrification from the Nagano end was commissioned in sections from 1966, and the entire line was electrified by 1973.

Chūō Main Line construction timeline
Section		Opening date	Builder
East Line	Tokyo	1 March 1919	JGR
East Line	Manseibashi †	1 March 1919	JGR
East Line	Manseibashi †	1 April 1912	JGR
East Line	Shōheibashi †	1 April 1912	JGR
East Line	Shōheibashi †	19 April 1908	JGR
East Line	Ochanomizu	19 April 1908	JGR
East Line	Ochanomizu	31 December 1904	Kōbu
East Line	Iidamachi †	31 December 1904	Kōbu
East Line	Iidamachi †	3 April 1895	Kōbu
East Line	Ushigome †	3 April 1895	Kōbu
East Line	Ushigome †	9 October 1894	Kōbu
East Line	Shinjuku	9 October 1894	Kōbu
East Line	Shinjuku	11 April 1889	Kōbu
East Line	Tachikawa	11 April 1889	Kōbu
East Line	Tachikawa	11 August 1889	Kōbu
East Line	Hachiōji	11 August 1889	Kōbu
East Line	Hachiōji	1 August 1901	JGR
East Line	Uenohara	1 August 1901	JGR
East Line	Uenohara	1 June 1902	JGR
East Line	Torisawa	1 June 1902	JGR
East Line	Torisawa	1 October 1902	JGR
East Line	Ōtsuki	1 October 1902	JGR
East Line	Ōtsuki	1 February 1903	JGR
East Line	Kai-Yamato (Hajikano)	1 February 1903	JGR
East Line	Kai-Yamato (Hajikano)	11 June 1903	JGR
East Line	Kōfu	11 June 1903	JGR
East Line	Kōfu	15 December 1903	JGR
East Line	Nirasaki	15 December 1903	JGR
East Line	Nirasaki	21 December 1904	JGR
East Line	Fujimi	21 December 1904	JGR
East Line	Fujimi	25 November 1905	JGR
East Line	Okaya	25 November 1905	JGR
East Line	Okaya	5 July 1983 (See note below)	JNR
East Line	Shiojiri	5 July 1983 (See note below)	JNR
West Line	Shiojiri	1 December 1909	JGR
West Line	Yabuhara	1 December 1909	JGR
West Line	Yabuhara	5 October 1910	JGR
West Line	Miyanokoshi	5 October 1910	JGR
West Line	Miyanokoshi	1 May 1911	JGR
West Line	Kiso-Fukushima	1 May 1911	JGR
West Line	Kiso-Fukushima	25 November 1910	JGR
West Line	Agematsu	25 November 1910	JGR
West Line	Agematsu	5 October 1910	JGR
West Line	Suhara	5 October 1910	JGR
West Line	Suhara	1 December 1909	JGR
West Line	Nojiri	1 December 1909	JGR
West Line	Nojiri	1 September 1909	JGR
West Line	Nagiso (Midono)	1 September 1909	JGR
West Line	Nagiso (Midono)	15 July 1909	JGR
West Line	Sakashita	15 July 1909	JGR
West Line	Sakashita	1 August 1908	JGR
West Line	Nakatsugawa (Nakatsu)	1 August 1908	JGR
West Line	Nakatsugawa (Nakatsu)	21 December 1902	JGR
West Line	Tajimi	21 December 1902	JGR
West Line	Tajimi	25 July 1900	JGR
West Line	Nagoya	25 July 1900	JGR

Notes:

- The section between Okaya Station and Shiojiri Station is the new route that replaced the old route opened on June 11, 1906, by JGR.
- Station names in parentheses are original names.
- Stations marked † are now closed.
- Prior to the connection of the East Line and the West Line in 1911, the section between Shiojiri Station and Miyanokoshi Station belonged to the East Line.

=== Former connecting lines ===
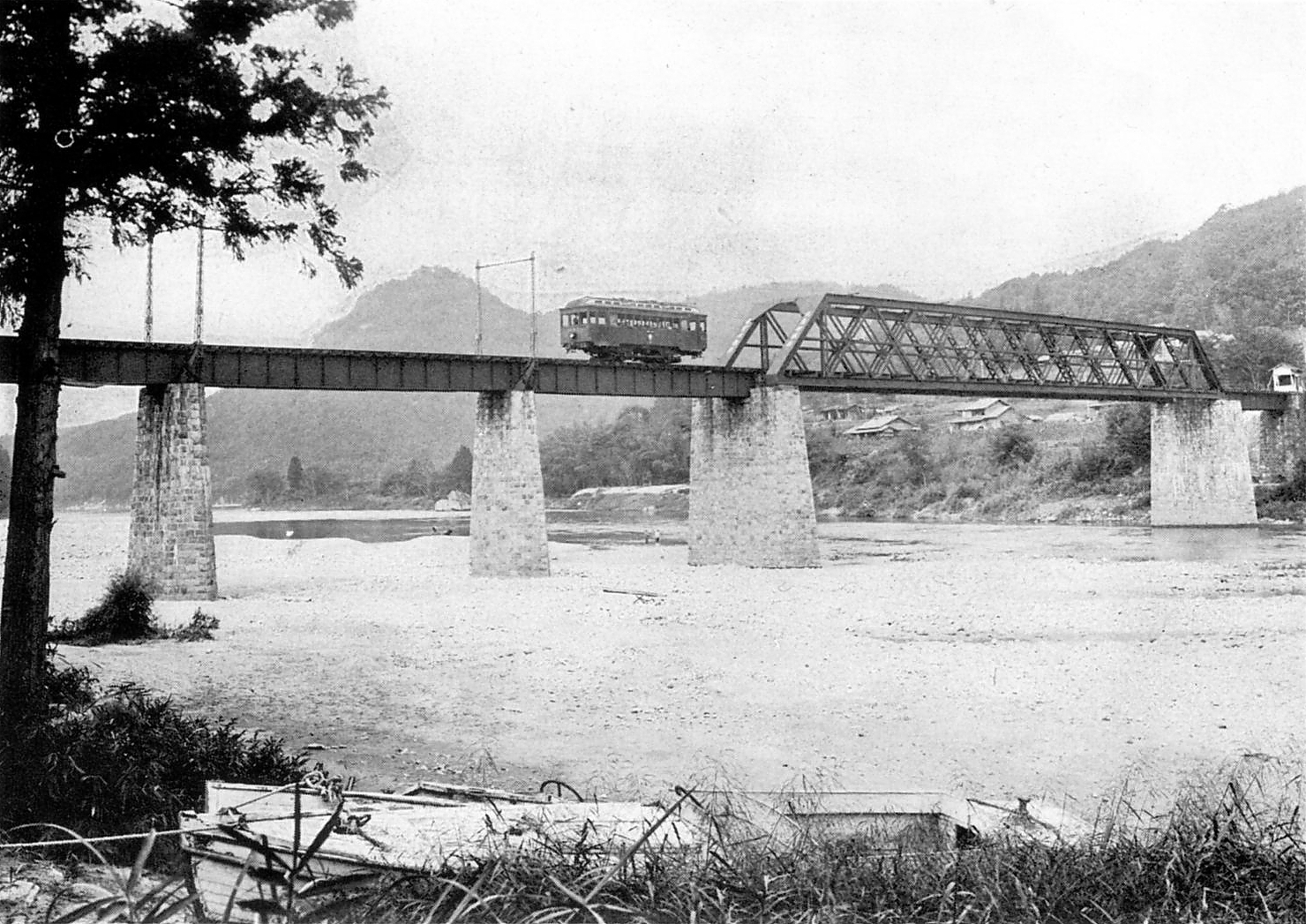
Kitaena train on the Kisogawa bridge, which still exists

- Mitaka Station: A 3 km (1.9 mi) line to a Nakajima Aircraft factory opened in 1942, and was closed in 1945. In 1950, the factory site was used to build a sports stadium. The line from Mitaka to Musashino Stadium (武蔵野競技場前) reopened on 14 April 1951, but was closed again on 1 November 1959.
- Kokubunji Station: A 7 km (4.3 mi) line was opened in 1910 to haul gravel from the Tamagawa. It closed in 1914 due to flood damage, but was reopened in 1916 after being rebuilt by the Japanese Army. On 26 May 1920, the line was absorbed into JNR, but operations were suspended from 1 December 1921. A 6 km (3.7 mi) extension to the Tokyo Racecourse opened on 1934. Services on the line were suspended from 1 October 1944, resuming from 24 April 1947. On 1 April 1973, the line to Tokyo Racecourse closed and the line was absorbed into the Musashino Line.
- Kofu Station: The Yamanashi Horse-drawn tramway opened its first 660 mm (2 ft 2 in) gauge section in 1898, and by 1904 had opened two lines (to Katsunuma and Fujikawa) totaling 34 km (21 mi). In 1930, the Katsunuma Line was closed, and the other line was closed beyond Kai-Aoyagi, 20 km (12 mi) from Kofu. The company renamed itself the Yamanashi Electric Railway, regauged (to 1,067 mm) and electrified the line at 600 V DC, and operated it until 1962.
- Sakashita Station: The 11 km (6.8 mi) 762 mm (2 ft 6 in) gauge Sakagawa Line was opened to Maruno by the Hisaka River Railway in 1926. A passenger service was operated 8 km (5.0 mi) to Okuya. The Forest Service opened a 9 km (5.6 mi) line connecting at Maruno the same year, and a 2 km (1.2 mi) branch from Okuya that operated from 1933 until 1958. In 1944, the Forest Service took over the Sakagawa line, operating it until 1961, when the entire 20 km (12 mi) line closed.
- Nakatsugawa Station: The Kitaena Railway operated the 23 km (14 mi) Enaden Line to Tsukechi, electrified at 600 V DC, from 1924 until 1978. At Tsukechi, it transshipped timber from a 762 mm (2 ft 6 in) gauge forest railway with an 18 km (11 mi) "main line" and a 14 km (8.7 mi) and two 5 km (3.1 mi) branch lines operated from 1932 until 1959.
- Ena Station: The Iwamura Electric Railway operated a 13 km (8.1 mi) line electrified at 600 V DC to its namesake town between 1906 and 1935. A 4 km (2.5 mi) line to the site of Oi dam was opened in 1922 to transport construction materials. Upon the dam's completion, the line was sold to the Kita-Ena Railway. but it closed in 1934.
- Tokishi Station: The Ogawa Railway opened a 10 km (6.2 mi) line to its namesake town between 1922 and 1924. The line was electrified at 1,500 V DC in 1950, and closed as a result of flood damage in 1972.
- Yabuhara Station: The Ogiso Forest line operated for an unknown period.
- Agematsu Station: The Otaki Forest Railway operated between 1911 and 1975.
- Nojiri Station: The Nojiri Forest Railway operated for an unknown period.
- Tajima Station: The Kasahara Railway opened a 5 km (3.1 mi) line to its namesake town in 1928. Passenger services ceased in 1971, and the line closed in 1978.

=== Proposed connecting lines ===
- Chino Station: The Saku Railway, which had built the line from Komoro on the Shinetsu Line to Koumi, proposed to build a line from Tanaka on the Shinetsu Line to this station. The company was nationalised before construction started, and JGR connected the Koumi line to the Chuo Main Line in 1935, making this proposal redundant.

=== Accidents ===
On September 12, 1997, a Super Azusa limited express bound for Matsumoto collided with a 201 series local train that failed to stop at a red signal while passing through Ōtsuki Station.
