= Ono Station (Nagano) =

Railway station in Tatsuno, Nagano Prefecture, Japan

Ono Station 小野駅
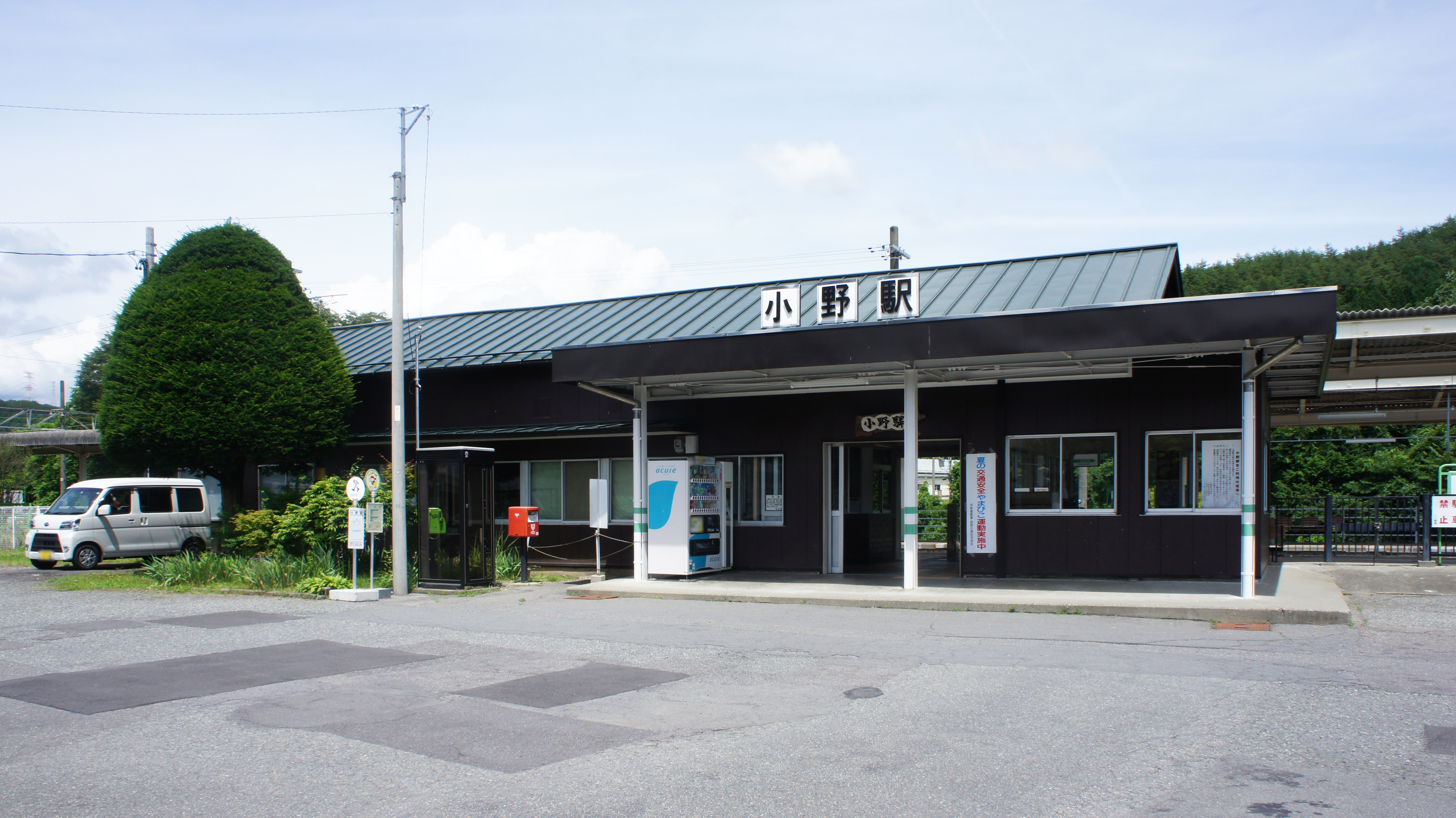
- Ono Station, July 2023

General information
- Location: 1289 Ono, Tatsuno-machi, Kamiina-gun, Nagano-ken 399-0601; Japan
- Coordinates: 36°02′49″N 137°58′14″E
- Elevation: 813.2 meters
- Operator: JR East
- Line: ■ Chūō Main Line
- Distance: 17.8 km from Okaya
- Platforms: 2 side platforms

Other information
- Status: Staffed
- Website: Official website

History
- Opened: 11 June 1906

Passengers
- FY2023: 210 (daily)

Services
| Preceding station | JR East | Following station |
|---|---|---|
| Shiojiri CO61 Terminus | Chūō Main Line Tatsuno Branch | Shinano-Kawashima towards Okaya |
Location
- Location within Nagano Prefecture Location within Japan

Ono Station (小野駅, Ono-eki) is a railway station in the town of Tatsuno Town, Kamiina District, Nagano Prefecture, Japan, operated by East Japan Railway Company (JR East).

== Lines ==
Ono Station is served by the old route of Chūō Main Line (Okaya-Shiojiri branch) and is 17.8 kilometers from the branching point of the line at Okaya Station and 228.2 from the terminus at Tokyo Station.

== Station layout ==
The station consists of two opposed ground-level side platforms connected by a footbridge. The station is a Kan'i itaku station.

=== Platforms ===
| 1 | ■ Chūō Main Line | for Tatsuno |
| 2 | ■ Chūō Main Line | for Shinano-Kawashima and Tatsuno |

== History ==
Ono Station opened on 6 June 1906. With the privatization of Japanese National Railways (JNR) on 1 April 1987, the station came under the control of JR East.

== Passenger statistics ==
In fiscal 2017, the JR East portion of the station was used by an average of 143 passengers daily (boarding passengers only).

== Surrounding area ==
- National Route 153
- Ono Jinja

== See also ==
- List of railway stations in Japan
