= Okaya Station =

Railway station in Okaya, Nagano Prefecture, Japan

CO59 Okaya Station 岡谷駅
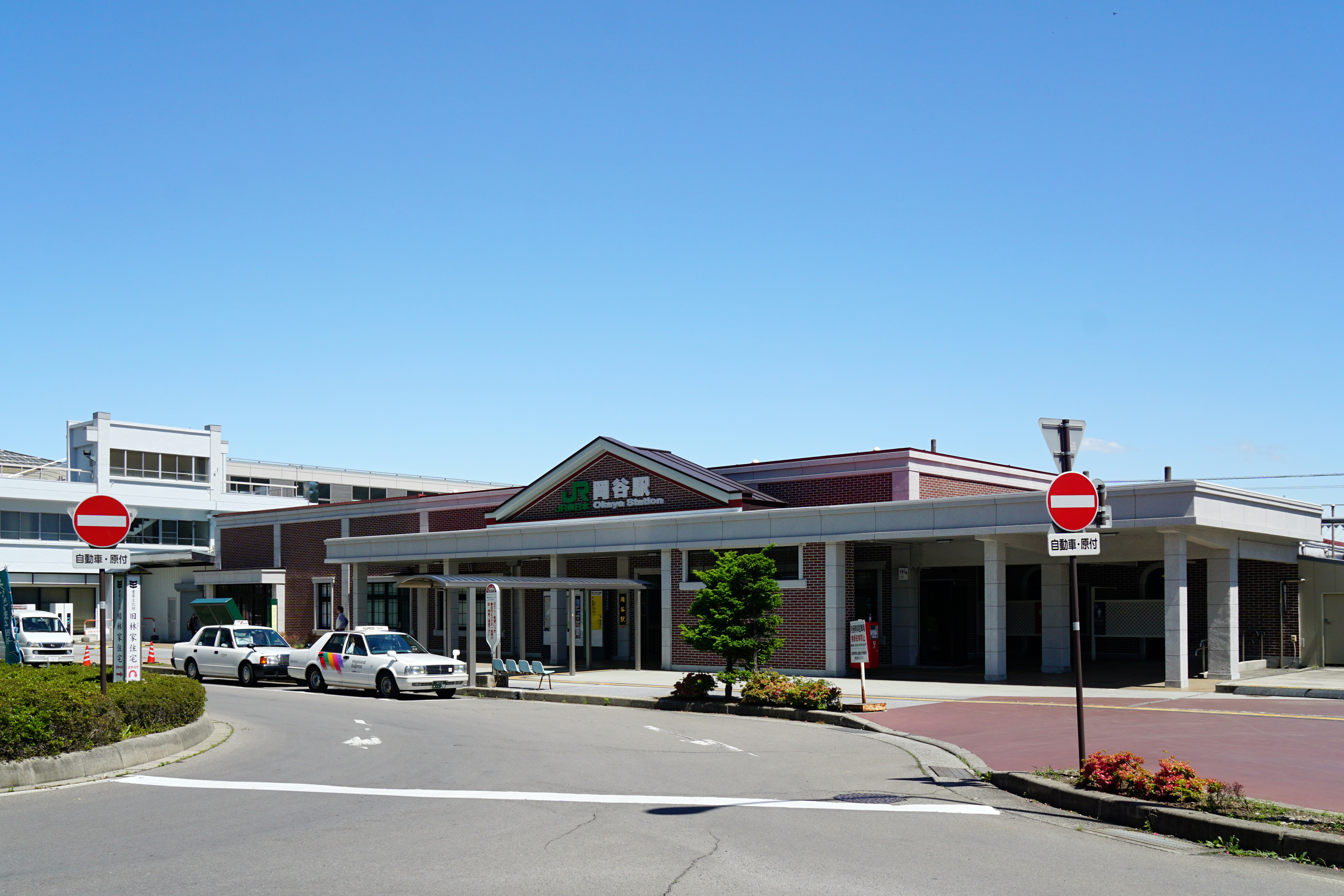
- Okaya Station in May 2017

General information
- Location: 1-1-1 Honchō, Okaya-shi, Nagano-ken 394-0028; Japan
- Coordinates: 36.056741°N 138.044618°E
- Elevation: 766 meters
- Owner: JR East
- Operator: JR East; JR Central
- Lines: Chūō Main Line; ■ Iida Line
- Platforms: 1 side + 1 island platform

Other information
- Status: Staffed (Midori no Madoguchi )
- Station code: CO59
- Website: Official website

History
- Opened: 25 November 1905; 120 years ago

Passengers
- FY2024: 5,630 (daily) ▲1.91%

Services
Preceding station	JR East	Following station
Shiojiri CO61 towards Hakuba	Azusa	Shimo-Suwa CO58 towards Chiba or Tokyo
Midoriko CO60 towards Shiojiri	Chūō Main Line Rapid Misuzu	through to JR Central
Midoriko CO60 towards Shiojiri	Chūō Main Line Local	Shimo-Suwa CO58 towards Tachikawa
Kawagishi towards Shiojiri	Chūō Main Line Tatsuno Branch	Terminus
Preceding station	JR Central	Following station
Kawagishi towards Iida	Iida Line Rapid Misuzu	through to JR East
Kawagishi One-way operation	Iida Line Rapid	Terminus
Kawagishi towards Toyohashi	Iida Line Local	Terminus
Location
- Location within Nagano Prefecture Location within Japan

Okaya Station (岡谷駅, Okaya-eki) is a railway station in Honchō, Okaya, Nagano Prefecture, Japan, jointly operated by JR Central and JR East. It is managed by JR East.

== Lines ==
Okaya Station is a terminus of the old route of the Chuo Main Line (Okaya-Shiojiri branch), and is 210.4 km from Tokyo Station. A small number of trains on the Iida Line also continue past the nominal terminus of that line at Tatsuno to stop at this station and the previous Kawagishi Station.

== Station layout ==
The station consists of one ground-level side platform with a cut-out serving two tracks, and one ground-level island platform serving two tracks. The platforms are connected to the station building by a footbridge. The station has a Midori no Madoguchi staffed ticket office.

=== Platforms ===
0	■ Iida Line	for Tatsuno, Iida, and Ina
1	■ Chūō Main Line	for Kami-Suwa,Kōfu, and Tokyo
2	■ Iida Line	for Tatsuno, Ina, and Iida
	■ Chūō Main Line	for Shiojiri, Matsumoto and Nagano for Kami-Suwa, Kōfu, and Tokyo
3	■ Chūō Main Line	for Shiojiri, Matsumoto, and Nagano
	■ Iida Line	for Tatsuno, Ida, and Ina

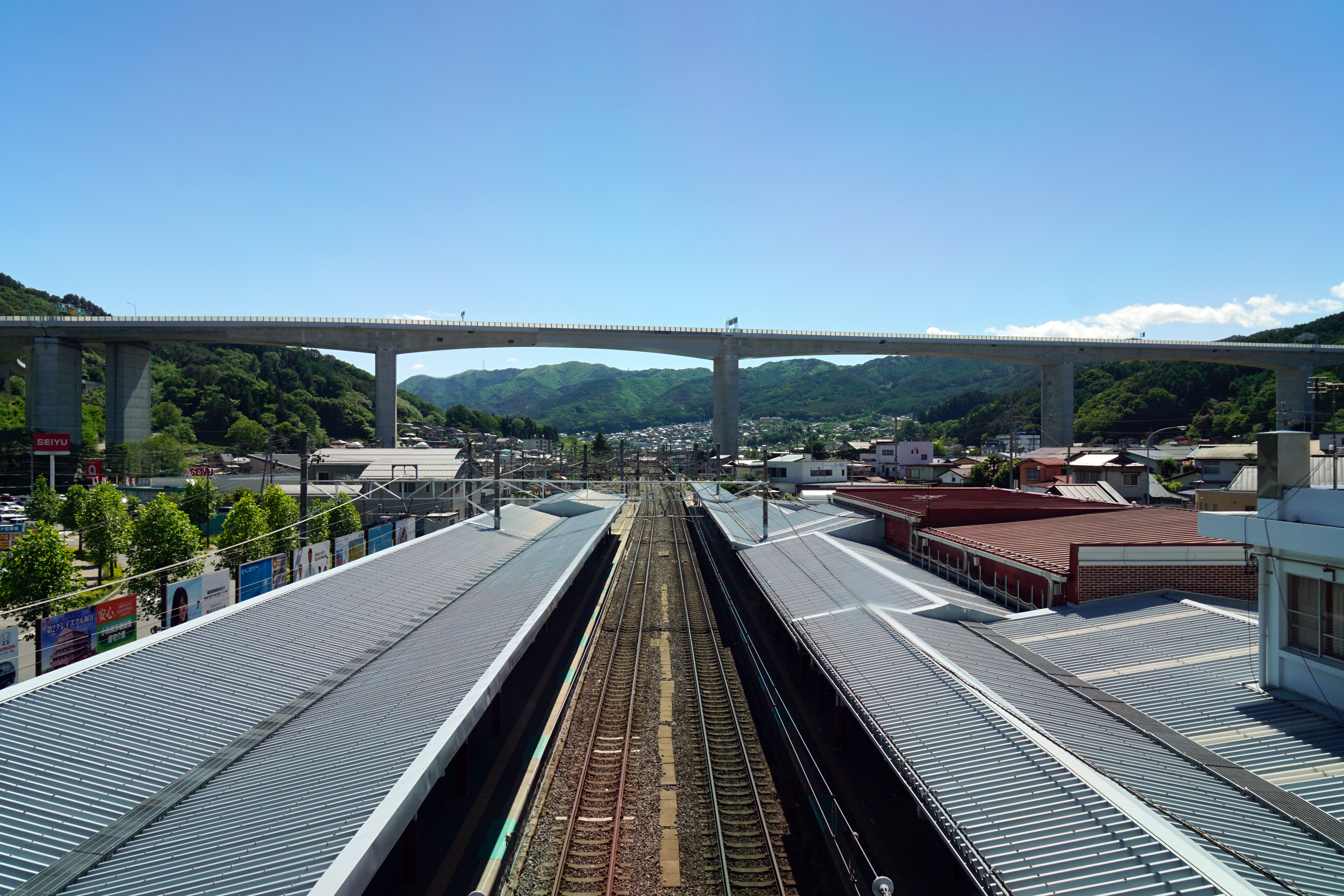
The platforms viewed from above in May 2017

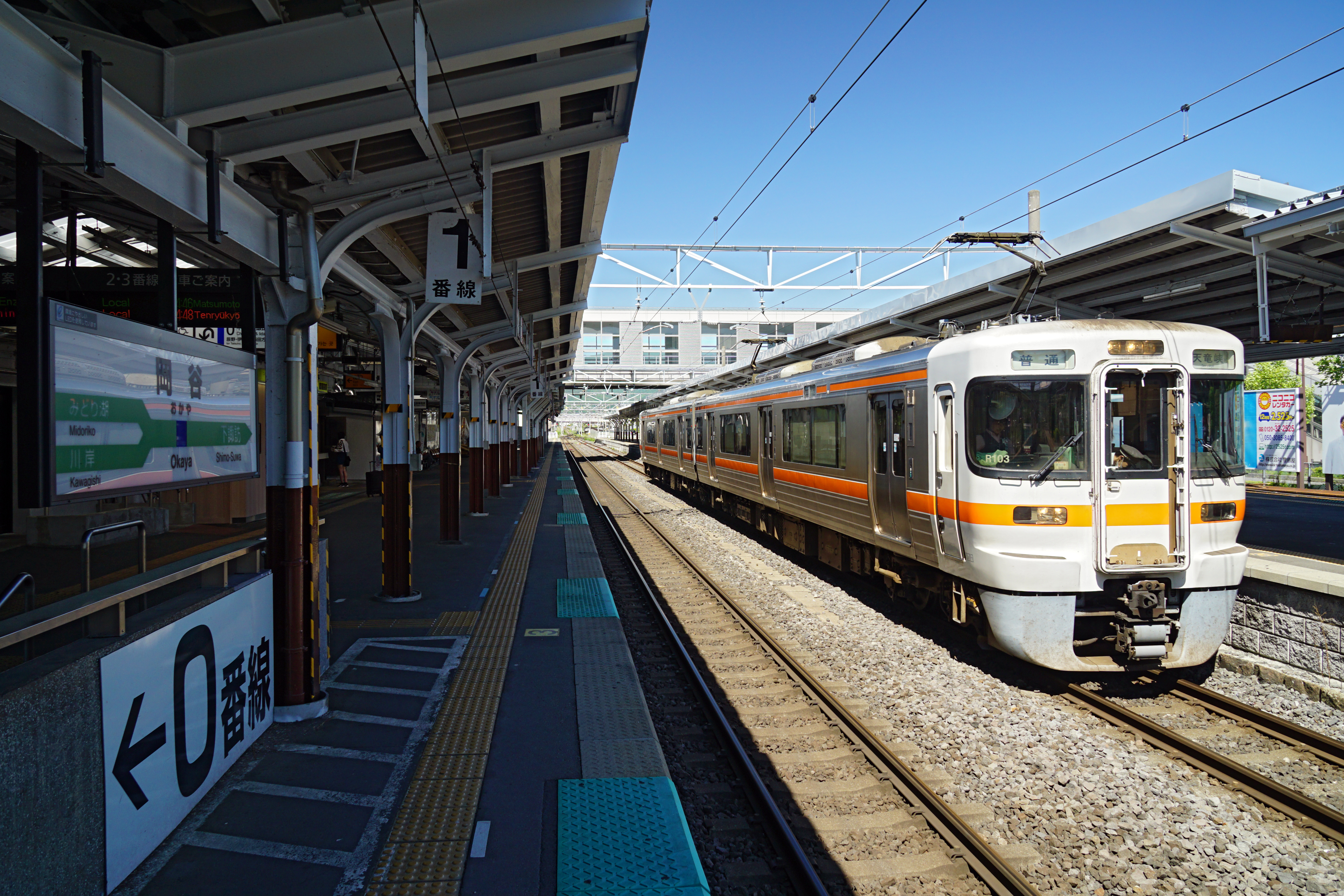
A JR Central 313 series EMU on an Iida Line service in May 2017

== Bus terminal ==
=== Highway buses ===
- Chūō Kōsoku Bus; For Shinjuku Station
- Alpen Suwa; For Kyōto Station, Momoyamadai Station, Shin-Ōsaka Station, and Umeda Station

== History ==
The station opened on 25 November 1905. With the privatization of Japanese National Railways (JNR) on 1 April 1987, the station came under the control of JR East. Station numbering introduced on the line from February 2025, with the station being assigned number CO59.

== Passenger statistics ==
In fiscal 2015, the station was used by an average of 3,167 passengers daily (boarding passengers only).

== Surrounding area ==
- Nagano Expressway

== See also ==
- List of railway stations in Japan
