= Kami-Suwa Station =

Railway station in Suwa, Nagano Prefecture, Japan

CO57 Kami-Suwa Station 上諏訪駅
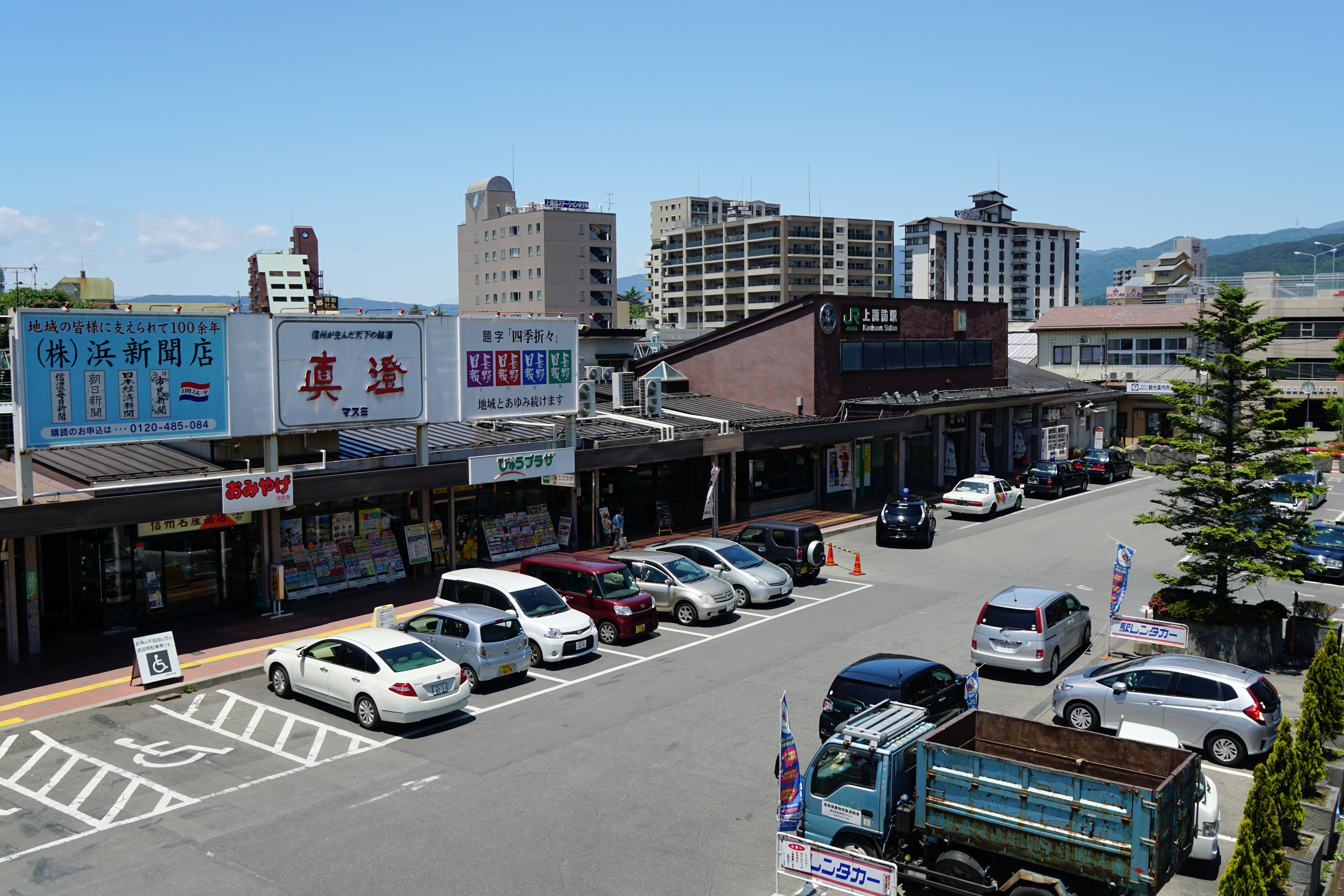
- Kami-Suwa Station forecourt in June 2016

General information
- Location: 1 Suwa, Suwa-shi, Nagano-ken 392-0004; Japan
- Coordinates: 36.0465°N 138.1165°E
- Elevation: 761.9 meters
- Operator: JR East
- Line: Chuo Main Line
- Distance: 201.9 kilometers from Tokyo
- Platforms: 1 side + 1 island platform
- Tracks: 3

Other information
- Status: Staffed ("Midori no Madoguchi")
- Station code: CO57
- Website: Official website

History
- Opened: 25 November 1905; 120 years ago

Passengers
- FY2024: 7,902 (daily) ▲3.18%

Services
Preceding station	JR East	Following station
Shimo-Suwa CO58 towards Hakuba	Azusa	Chino CO56 towards Chiba or Tokyo
Shimo-Suwa CO58 towards Shiojiri	Chūō Main Line Local	Chino CO56 towards Tachikawa
Location
- Location within Nagano Prefecture Location within Japan

Kami-Suwa Station (上諏訪駅, Kami-Suwa-eki) is a railway station on the Chuo Main Line in Suwa, Nagano, Japan, operated by East Japan Railway Company (JR East).

== Lines ==
Kami-Suwa Station is served by the Chuo Main Line with through trains to and from Shinjuku in Tokyo. It is located 201.9 kilometers from Tokyo Station.

== Station layout ==
The station has one side platform and one island platform serving three tracks. The station has a "Midori no Madoguchi" staffed ticket office and a View Plaza travel agency.

=== Platforms ===
1	■ Chuo Main Line	for Kobuchizawa, Kōfu, and Shinjuku
2	■ Chuo Main Line	for Shiojiri, Matsumoto, and Nagano
3	■ Chuo Main Line	for Kobuchizawa, Kōfu, and Shinjuku
3	■ Chuo Main Line	for Shiojiri, Matsumoto, and Nagano

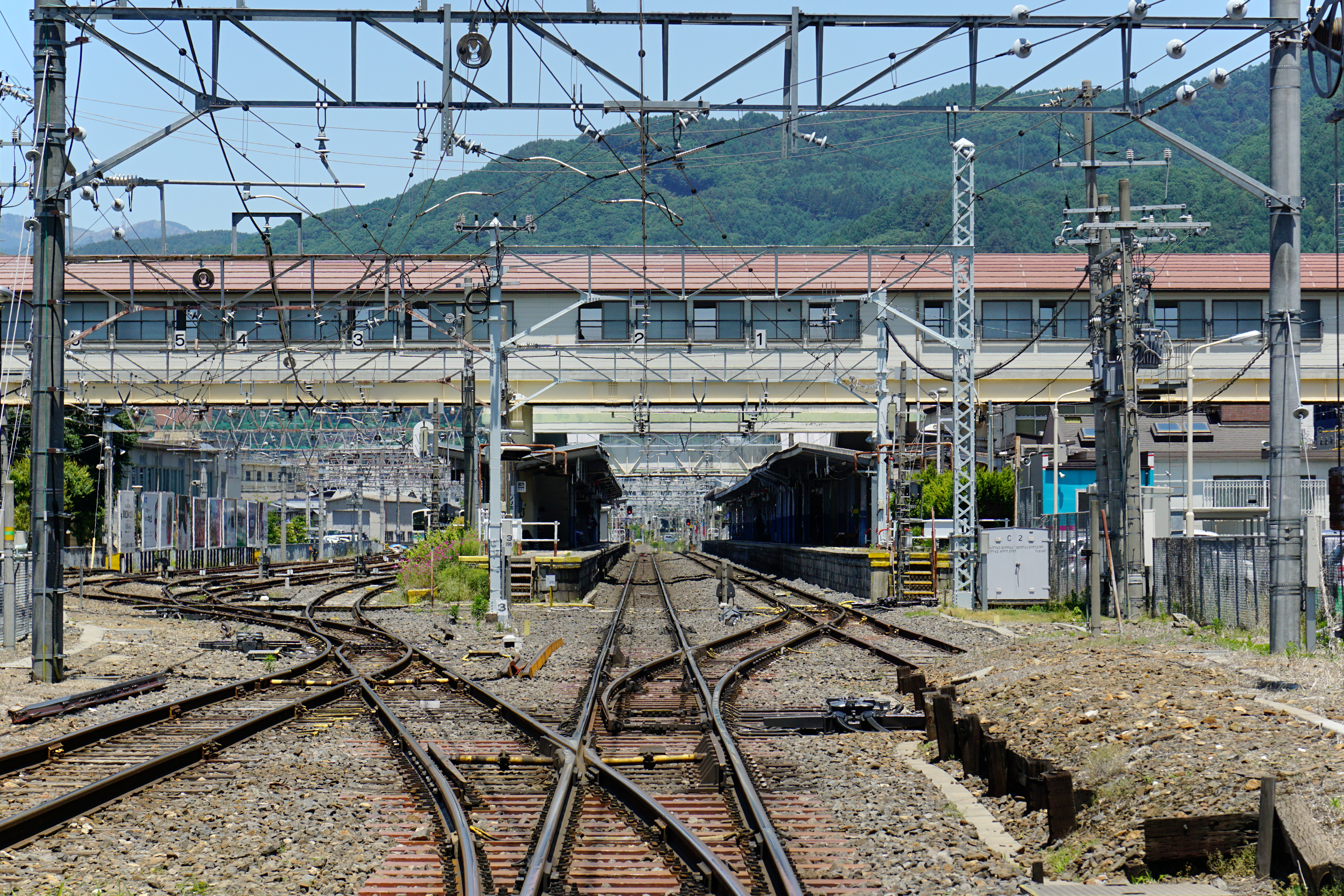
The station platforms viewed from the south in June 2016

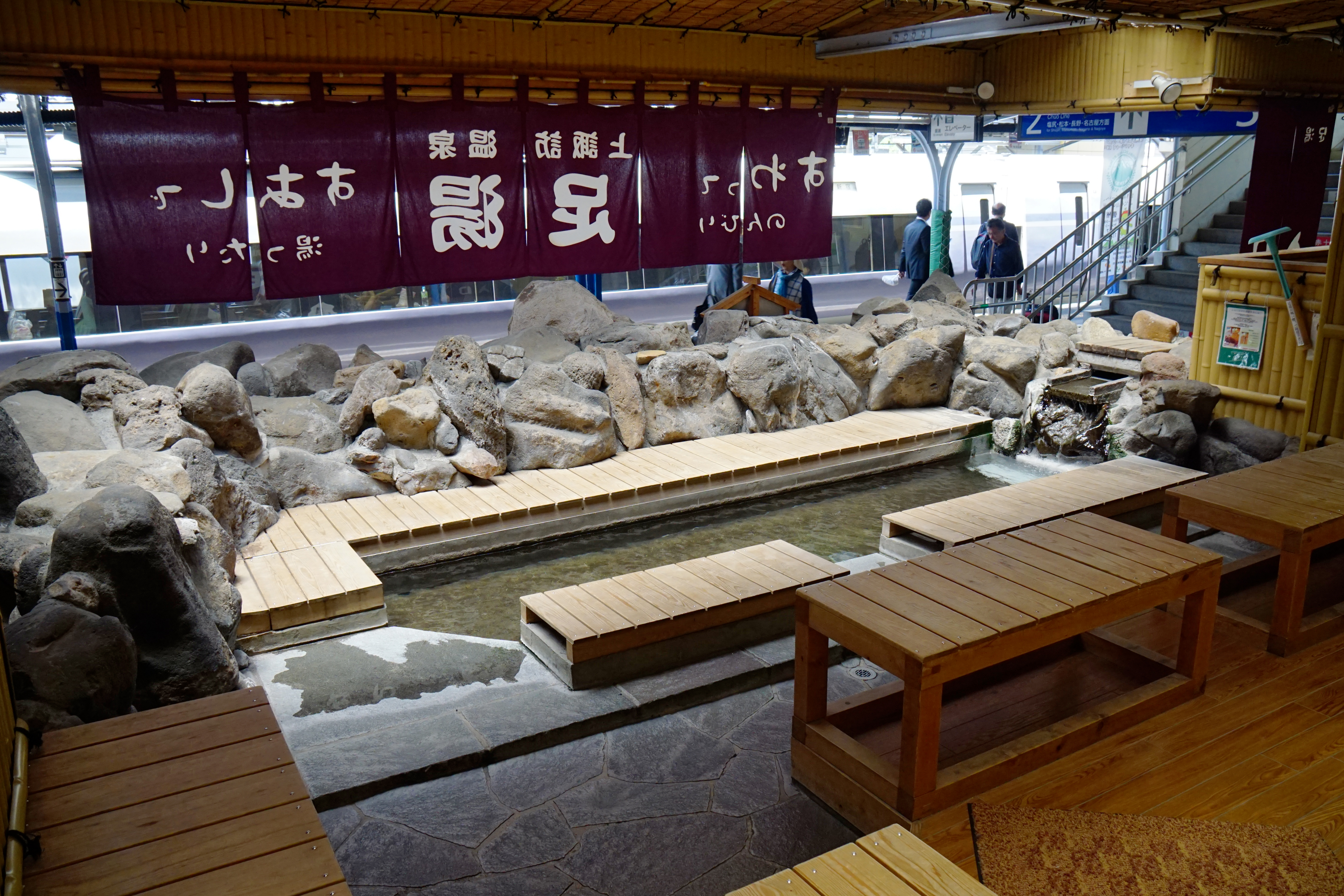
The ashiyu footbath on platform 1

== History ==
The station opened on 25 November 1905. With the privatization of Japanese National Railways (JNR) on 1 April 1987, the station came under the control of JR East. Station numbering introduced on the line from February 2025, with the station being assigned number CO52.

== Passenger statistics ==
In fiscal 2017, the station was used by an average of 4,367 passengers daily (boarding passengers only). The passenger figures for previous years are as shown below.

Fiscal year	Daily average
2000	4,742
2005	4,598
2010	4,320
2015	4,339

== Surrounding area ==
- Lake Suwa

== See also ==
- List of railway stations in Japan
