= Shiojiri Station =

Railway station in Shiojiri, Nagano Prefecture, Japan

CO61 SN01 Shiojiri Station 塩尻駅
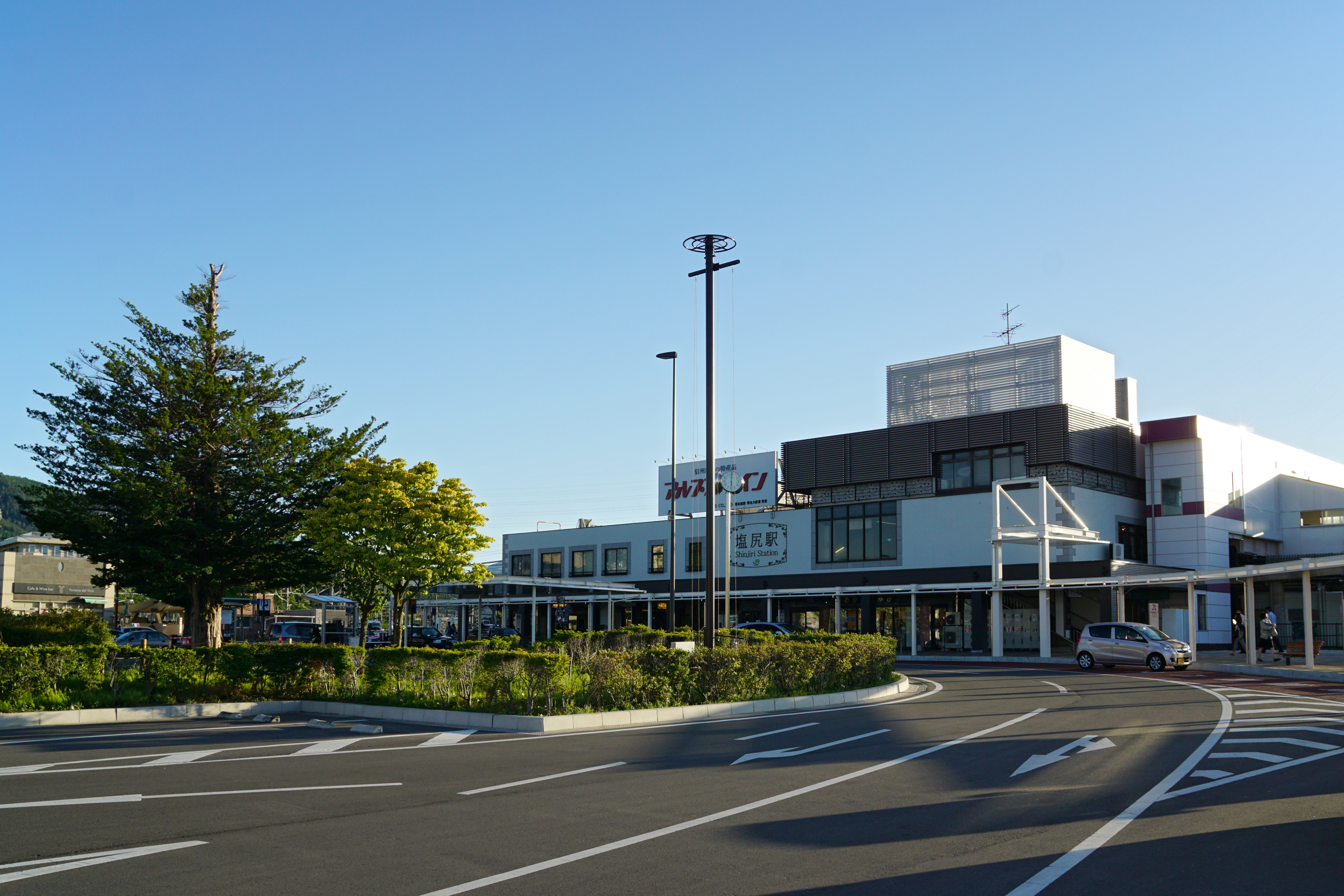
- Shiojiri Station in June 2015

General information
- Location: Daimon Hachibancho, Shiojiri, Nagano Prefecture 399-0737; Japan
- Coordinates: 36°6′53.2″N 137°56′52.5″E
- Elevation: 715.8 m (2,348 ft)
- Operator: JR East
- Lines: Chūō Main Line (JR East); Shinonoi Line; Chūō Main Line (JR Central)
- Distance: 222.1 km (138.0 mi) from Tokyo
- Platforms: 3 island platforms
- Train operators: JR Central; Japan Freight Railway Company; JR East

Other information
- Status: Staffed (Midori no Madoguchi )
- Station code: CO61, SN01
- Website: JR East Shiojiri Station

History
- Opened: 15 December 1902; 123 years ago

Passengers
- FY2024: 8,132 (daily) ▲4.04%

Services
Preceding station	JR East	Following station
Matsumoto SN06 towards Hakuba	Azusa	Okaya CO59 towards Chiba or Tokyo
through to Shinonoi Line	Chūō Main Line Rapid Misuzu	Midoriko CO60 towards Tachikawa
Terminus	Chūō Main Line Local	Midoriko CO60 towards Tachikawa
Terminus	Chūō Main Line Tatsuno Branch	Ono towards Okaya
through to JR Central	Shinano	Matsumoto SN06 towards Nagano
Terminus	Shinonoi Line Rapid	Hirooka SN02 towards Shinonoi
through to Chūō Main Line (JR East)	Shinonoi Line Rapid Misuzu	Hirooka SN02 towards Shinonoi
Terminus	Shinonoi Line Local	Hirooka SN02 towards Shinonoi
Preceding station	JR Central	Following station
Kiso-Fukushima towards Nagoya	Shinano	through to JR East
Seba towards Nagoya	Chūō Main Line Local	Terminus
Location
- Location within Nagano Prefecture Location within Japan

Shiojiri Station (塩尻駅, Shiojiri-eki) is a train station in the city of Shiojiri, Nagano Prefecture, Japan, operated jointly by East Japan Railway Company (JR East), with a freight terminal operated by the Japan Freight Railway Company. It is the operational border between JR East and Central Japan Railway Company (JR Central) for the Chūō Main Line.

== Lines ==
Shiojiri Station is served by the Chūō Main Line (Chūō East Line), and is 222.1 kilometers from the starting point of the line at Tokyo Station. It is also the terminus of the 27.7 kilometer Okaya – Shiojiri branch line. It is also the terminus for the Shinonoi Line.

== Station layout ==
The station consists of three ground-level island platforms, connected to the station building by an elevated station building. The station has a Midori no Madoguchi staffed ticket office.

=== Platforms ===
1	■ Chūō Main Line	for Kami-Suwa, Kōfu and Shinjuku
2	■ Shinonoi Line	for Matsumoto, Shinonoi and Nagano
3	■ Chūō Main Line	Tatsuno and Iida
	■ Chūō Main Line	for Kiso-Fukushima, Nakatsugawa and Nagoya
	■ Chūō Main Line	for Kami-Suwa, Kōfu and Shinjuku
	■ Shinonoi Line	for Matsumoto, Shinonoi and Nagano
4	■ Chūō Main Line	for Kami-Suwa, Kōfu and Shinjuku
	■ Shinonoi Line	for Matsumoto, Shinonoi and Nagano
	■ Chūō Main Line	for Kiso-Fukushima, Nakatsugawa and Nagoya
5	■ Chūō Main Line	for Kiso-Fukushima, Nakatsugawa and Nagoya
6	■ Shinonoi Line	for Matsumoto, Shinonoi and Nagano

== History ==
Shiojiri Station opened on 15 December 1902, initially as the terminal of a Chuo Line extension from Matsumoto. The station was relocated in 1982, with the old station being converted to a classification yard. With the 1987 privatization of the Japanese National Railways, the station was assigned to the control of the East Japan Railway Company. Station numbering was introduced by JR East from February 2025, with CO61 for Chuo Main Line (Chuo East Line) and SN01 for Shinonoi Line.

== Passenger statistics ==
In fiscal 2015, the station was used by an average of 3,981 passengers daily (boarding passengers only).

== Surrounding area ==
- Shiojiri City Hall
