= Jūnikane Station =

Railway station in Nagiso, Nagano Prefecture, Japan

Jūnikane Station 十二兼駅
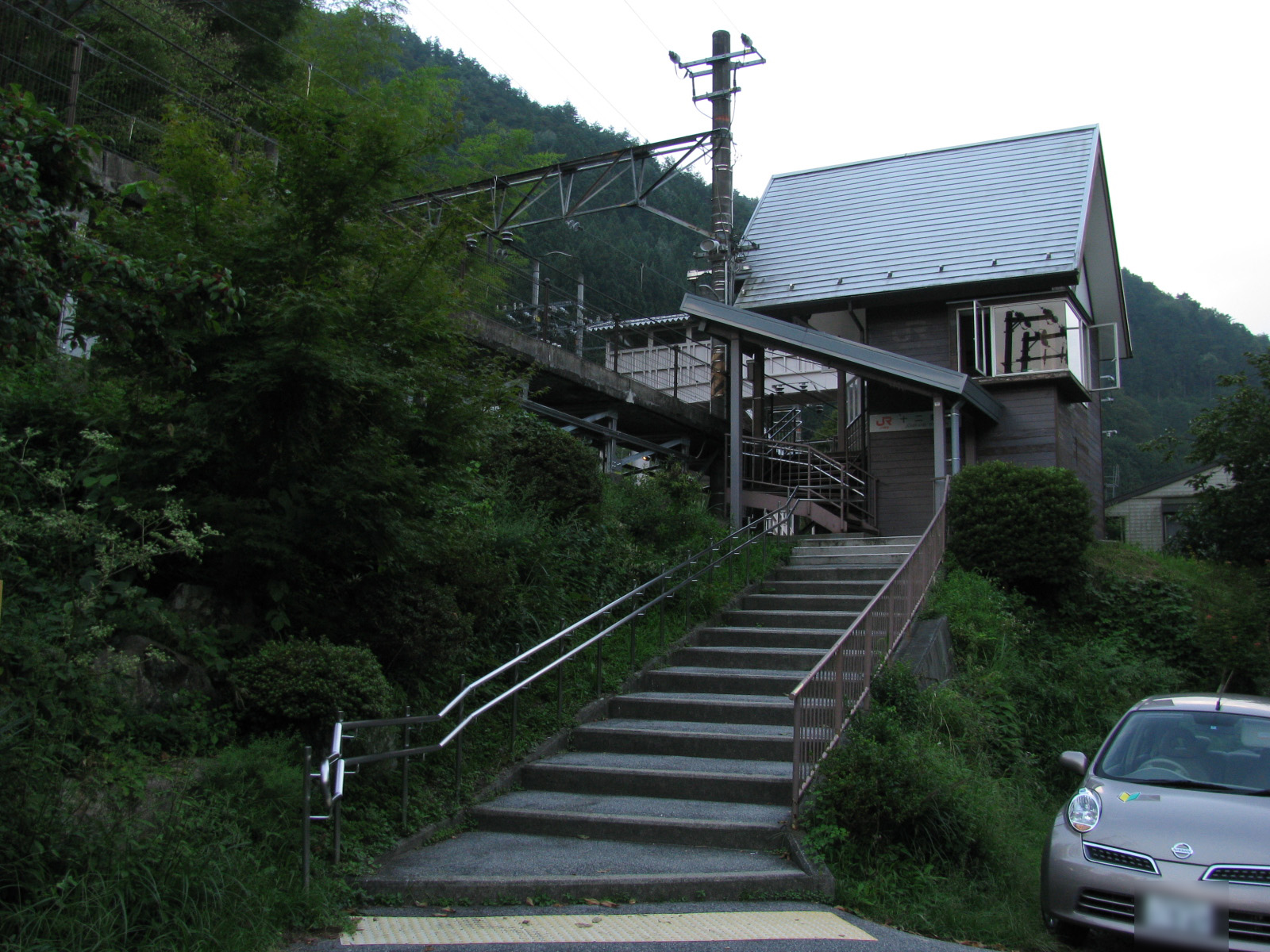
- Jūnikane Station in September 2008

General information
- Location: Yomikaki, Nagiso-machi, Kiso-gun, Nagano-ken 399-5301; Japan
- Coordinates: 35.6461°N 137.6177°E
- Elevation: 474.4 meters
- Operator: JR Central
- Line: Chūō Main Line
- Distance: 292.5 km from Tokyo
- Platforms: 2 side platforms
- Tracks: 2

Other information
- Status: Unstaffed

History
- Opened: 1 September 1948; 78 years ago

Passengers
- FY2015: 20 daily
Location
- Location within Nagano Prefecture Location within Japan

Jūnikane Station (十二兼駅, Jūnikane-eki) is a railway station in the town of Nagiso, Nagano Prefecture, Japan, operated by Central Japan Railway Company (JR Tōkai).

== Lines ==
Jūnikane Station is served by the JR Tōkai Chūō Main Line, and is located 292.5 kilometers from the official starting point of the line at Tokyo and 104.4 kilometers from Nagoya.

== Layout ==
The station has two opposed ground-level side platforms connected by a footbridge. The station is unattended.

=== Platforms ===
1	■ Chūō Main Line	For Kiso-Fukushima and Nagano
2	■ Chūō Main Line	For Nakatsugawa and Nagoya

== Adjacent stations ==
←	Service	→
JR Central Chūō Main Line
Nojiri	Local	Nagiso

== History ==
Jūnikane Station began as "Jūnikane Signal Stop" on 3 December 1929. It was elevated to a full passenger station on 1 September 1948. On 1 April 1987, it became part of JR Tōkai.

== Passenger statistics ==
In fiscal 2015, the station was used by an average of 20 passengers daily (boarding passengers only).

== Surrounding area ==
- National Route 19

== See also ==
- List of railway stations in Japan
