= Sakashita Station =

Railway station in Nakatsugawa, Gifu Prefecture, Japan

Sakashita Station 坂下駅
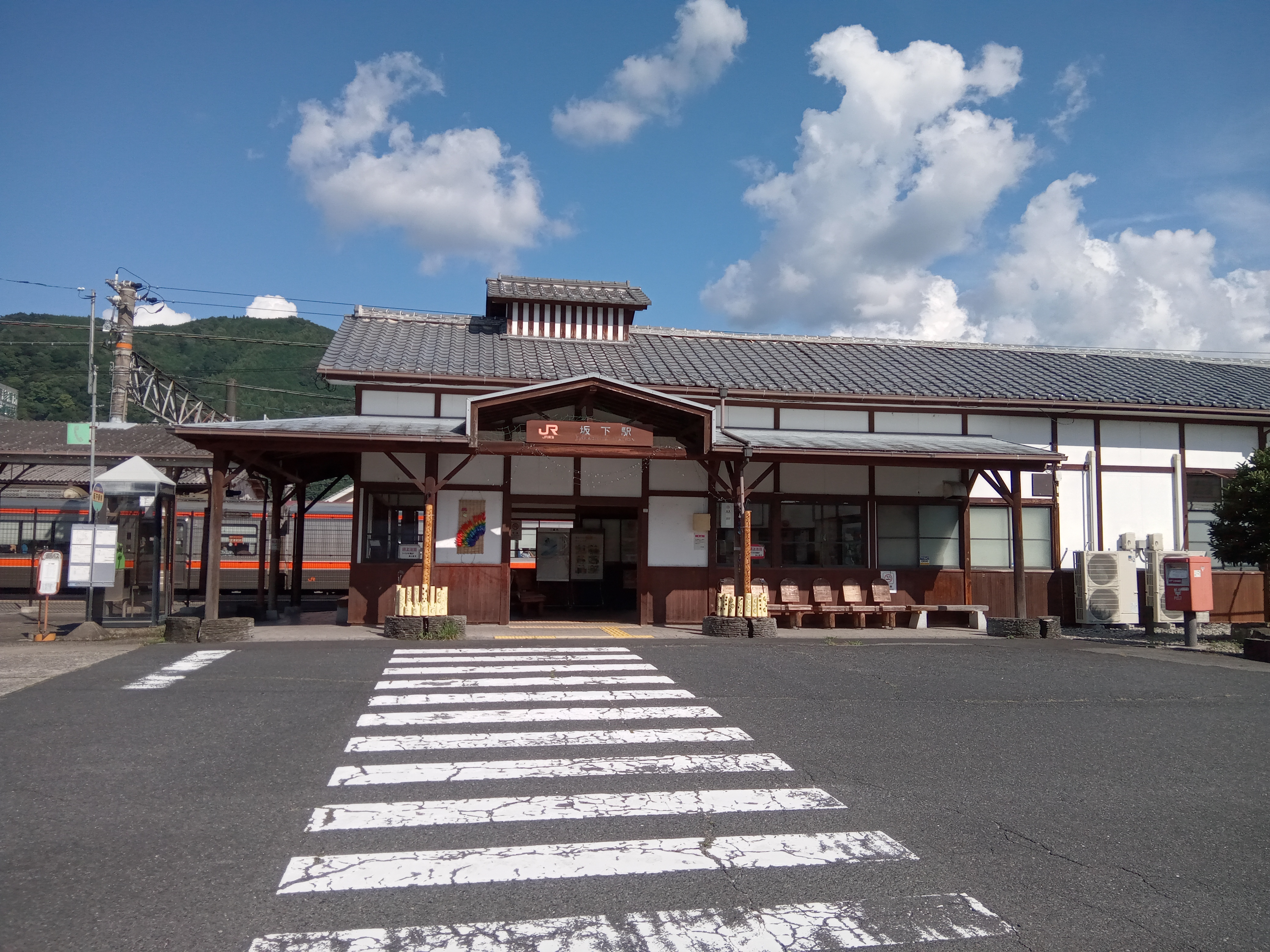
- Sakashita Station

General information
- Location: Sakashita, Nakatsugawa-shi, Gifu-ken 509-9232; Japan
- Coordinates: 35.5744°N 137.5305°E
- Operator: JR Central
- Line: Chūō Main Line
- Distance: 307.1 km from Tokyo
- Platforms: 1 side + 1 island platform
- Tracks: 3

Other information
- Status: Staffed
- Station code: CF21

History
- Opened: 1 August 1908; 118 years ago

Passengers
- FY2014: 524 daily
Location
- Location within Gifu Prefecture Location within Japan

Sakashita Station (坂下駅, Sakashita-eki) is a railway station in the city of Nakatsugawa, Gifu Prefecture, Japan, operated by Central Japan Railway Company (JR Tōkai).

== Lines ==
Sakashita Station is served by the JR Tōkai Chūō Main Line and is located 307.1 kilometers from the official starting point of the line at Tokyo and 89.8 kilometers from Nagoya.

== Layout ==
The station has one ground-level side platform and one ground-level island platform connected by a footbridge. The station is attended.

=== Platforms ===
1, 2	■ Chūō Main Line	For Kiso-Fukushima and Nagano
3	■ Chūō Main Line	For Nakatsugawa and Nagoya

== Adjacent stations ==
←	Service	→
JR Central Chūō Main Line
Tadachi	Local	Ochiaigawa

== History ==
Sakashita Station was opened on 1 August 1908. On 1 April 1987, it became part of JR Tōkai.

== Passenger statistics ==
In fiscal 2014, the station was used by an average of 524 passengers daily (boarding passengers only).

== Surrounding area ==
- Former Sakashita Town Hall
- Sakashita Elementary School

== See also ==
- List of railway stations in Japan
