= Nojiri Station =

Railway station in Ōkuwa, Nagano Prefecture, Japan

Nojiri Station 野尻駅
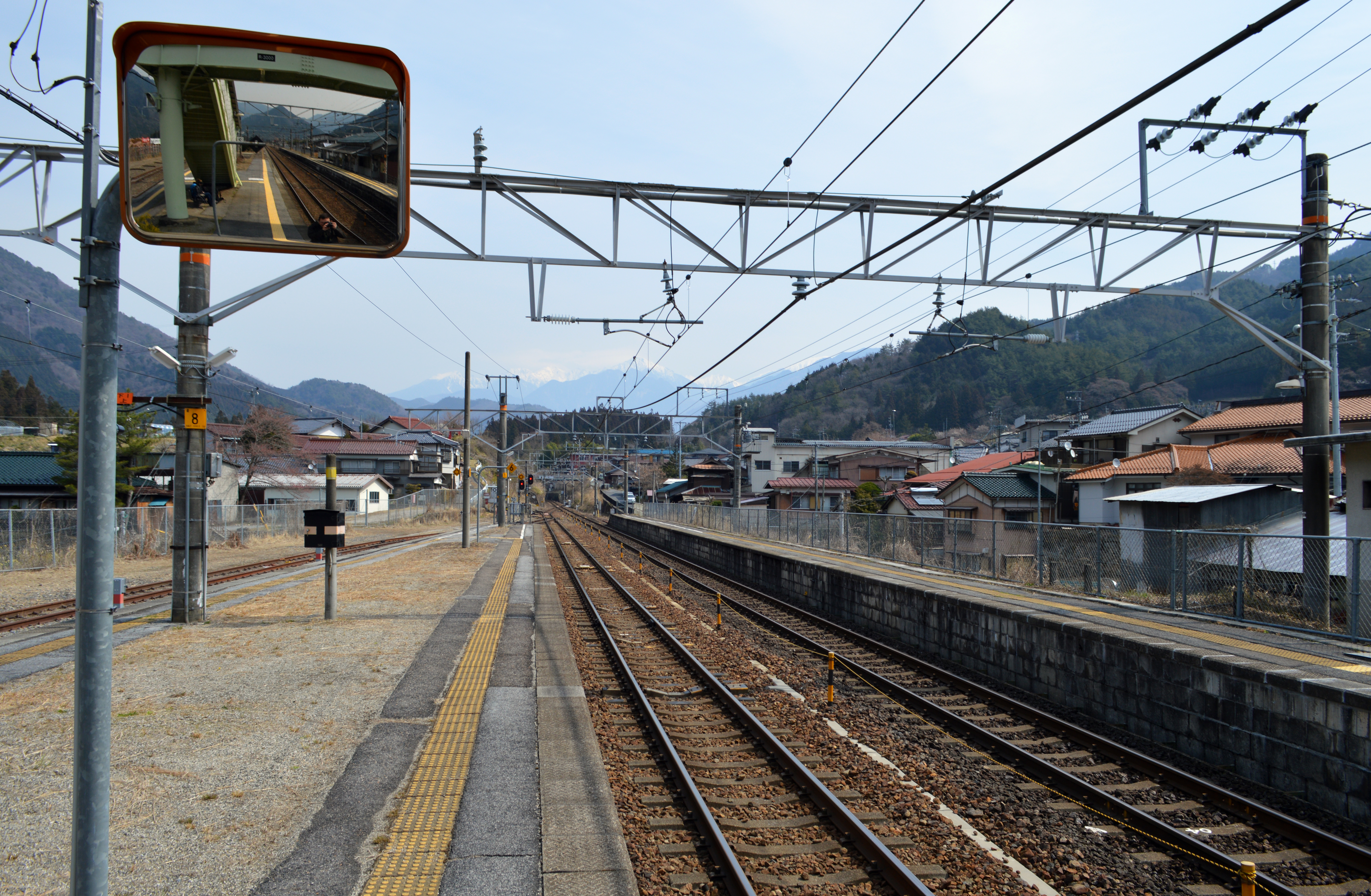

General information
- Location: Nojiri, Ōkuwa-mura, Kiso-gun, Nagano-ken 399-5504; Japan
- Coordinates: 35.6728°N 137.6354°E
- Elevation: 522.2 meters
- Operator: JR Central
- Line: Chūō Main Line
- Distance: 288.8 km from Tokyo
- Platforms: 1 side + 1 island platform
- Tracks: 3

Other information
- Status: Staffed

History
- Opened: 1 September 1909; 116 years ago

Passengers
- FY2015: 116 daily
Location
- Location within Nagano Prefecture Location within Japan

Nojiri Station (野尻駅, Nojiri-eki) is a railway station in the village of Ōkuwa, Nagano Prefecture, Japan, operated by Central Japan Railway Company (JR Tōkai).

== Lines ==
Nojiri Station is served by the JR Tōkai Chūō Main Line, and is located 288.8 kilometers from the official starting point of the line at Tokyo and 108.1 kilometers from Nagoya.

== Layout ==
The station has one opposed ground-level side platform and one island platform connected by a footbridge with the wooden station building, which dates from the 1909 construction of the station. The station is staffed.

=== Platforms ===
1	■ Chūō Main Line	For Nakatsugawa and Nagoya
2, 3	■ Chūō Main Line	For Kiso-Fukushima and Nagano

== Adjacent stations ==
←	Service	→
JR Central Chūō Main Line
Ōkuwa	Local	Jūnikane

== History ==
Nojiri Station was opened on 1 September 1909. On 1 April 1987, it became part of JR Tōkai.

== Passenger statistics ==
In fiscal 2015, the station was used by an average of 116 passengers daily (boarding passengers only).

== Surrounding area ==
- Ōkuwa Elementary School
- Nojiri Post Office
- Kiso River
- National Route 19
- Nojiri-juku (Nakasendō)

== See also ==
- List of railway stations in Japan
