= Tadachi Station =

Railway station in Nagiso, Nagano Prefecture, Japan

Tadachi Station 田立駅
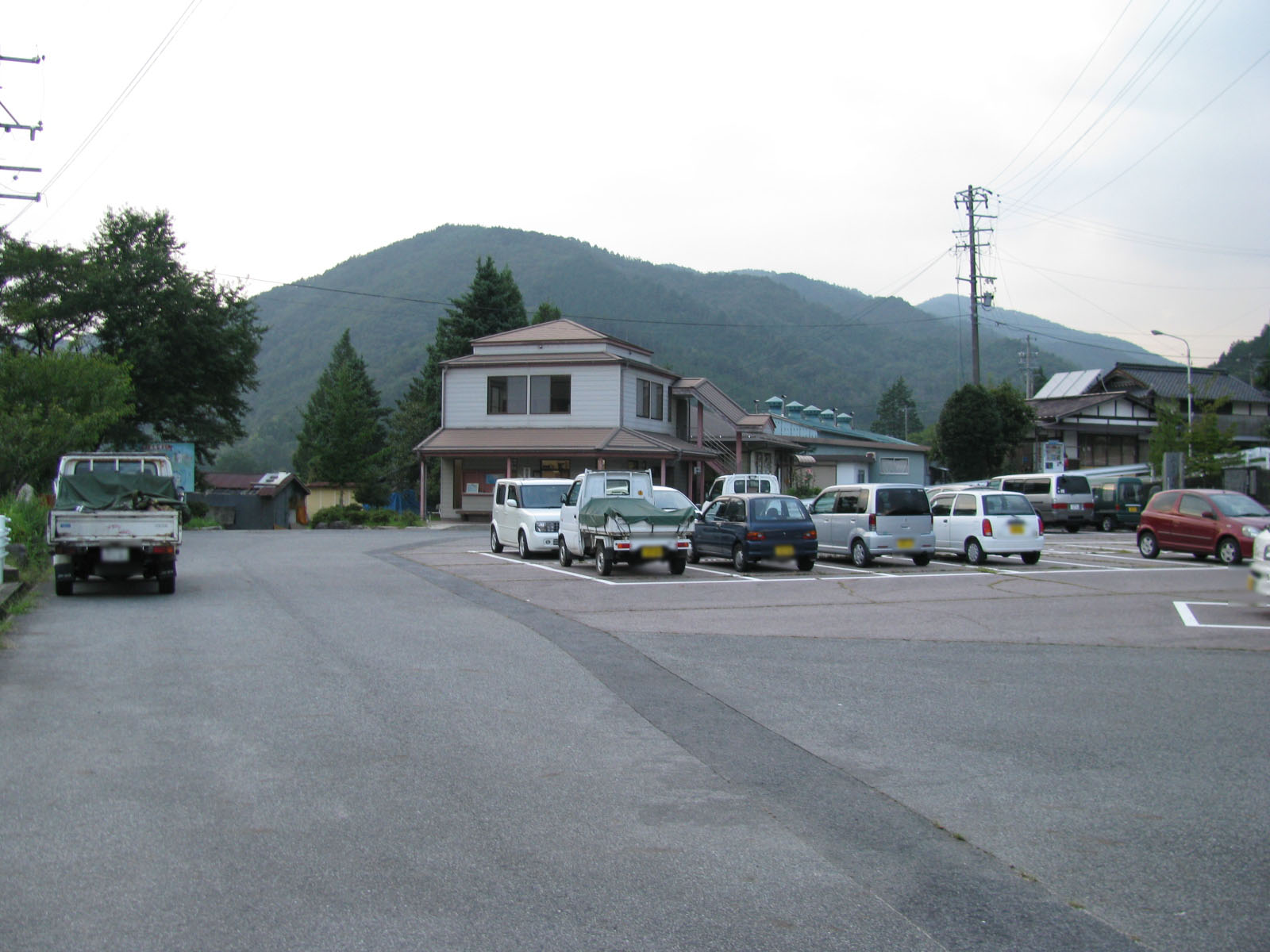
- Tadachi Station in September 2008

General information
- Location: Tadachi, Nagiso, Kiso-gun, Nagano-ken 399-5303; Japan
- Coordinates: 35.5883°N 137.5489°E
- Elevation: 350.2 meters
- Operator: JR Central
- Line: Chūō Main Line
- Distance: 304.3 km from Tokyo
- Platforms: 2 side platforms
- Tracks: 2

Other information
- Status: Unstaffed

History
- Opened: 1 September 1948; 78 years ago

Passengers
- FY2015: 69 daily
Location
- Location within Nagano Prefecture Location within Japan

Tadachi Station (田立駅, Tadachi-eki) is a railway station in the town of Nagiso, Nagano Prefecture, Japan, operated by Central Japan Railway Company (JR Tōkai).

== Lines ==
Tadachi Station is served by the JR Tōkai Chūō Main Line, and is located 304.3 kilometers from the official starting point of the line at Tokyo and 92.6 kilometers from Nagoya.

== Layout ==
The station has two opposed ground-level side platforms connected by a footbridge. The station is unattended.

=== Platforms ===
1	■ Chūō Main Line	For Kiso-Fukushima and Nagano
2	■ Chūō Main Line	For Nakatsugawa and Nagoya

== Adjacent stations ==
←	Service	→
JR Central Chūō Main Line
Nagiso	Local	Sakashita

== History ==
Tadachi Station began as "Tadachi Signal Stop" on 3 December 1929. It was elevated to a full passenger station on 1 September 1948. On 25 May 1973, the station was relocated to its present address, 150 meters in the direction of Sakashita Station from its original location. On 1 April 1987, it became part of JR Tōkai.

== Passenger statistics ==
In fiscal 2014, the station was used by an average of 524 passengers daily (boarding passengers only).

== Surrounding area ==
- Tadachi Post Office
- Kiso River
- National Route 19

== See also ==
- List of railway stations in Japan
