= Ōkuwa Station (Nagano) =

Railway station in Ōkuwa, Nagano Prefecture, Japan

Ōkuwa Station 大桑駅
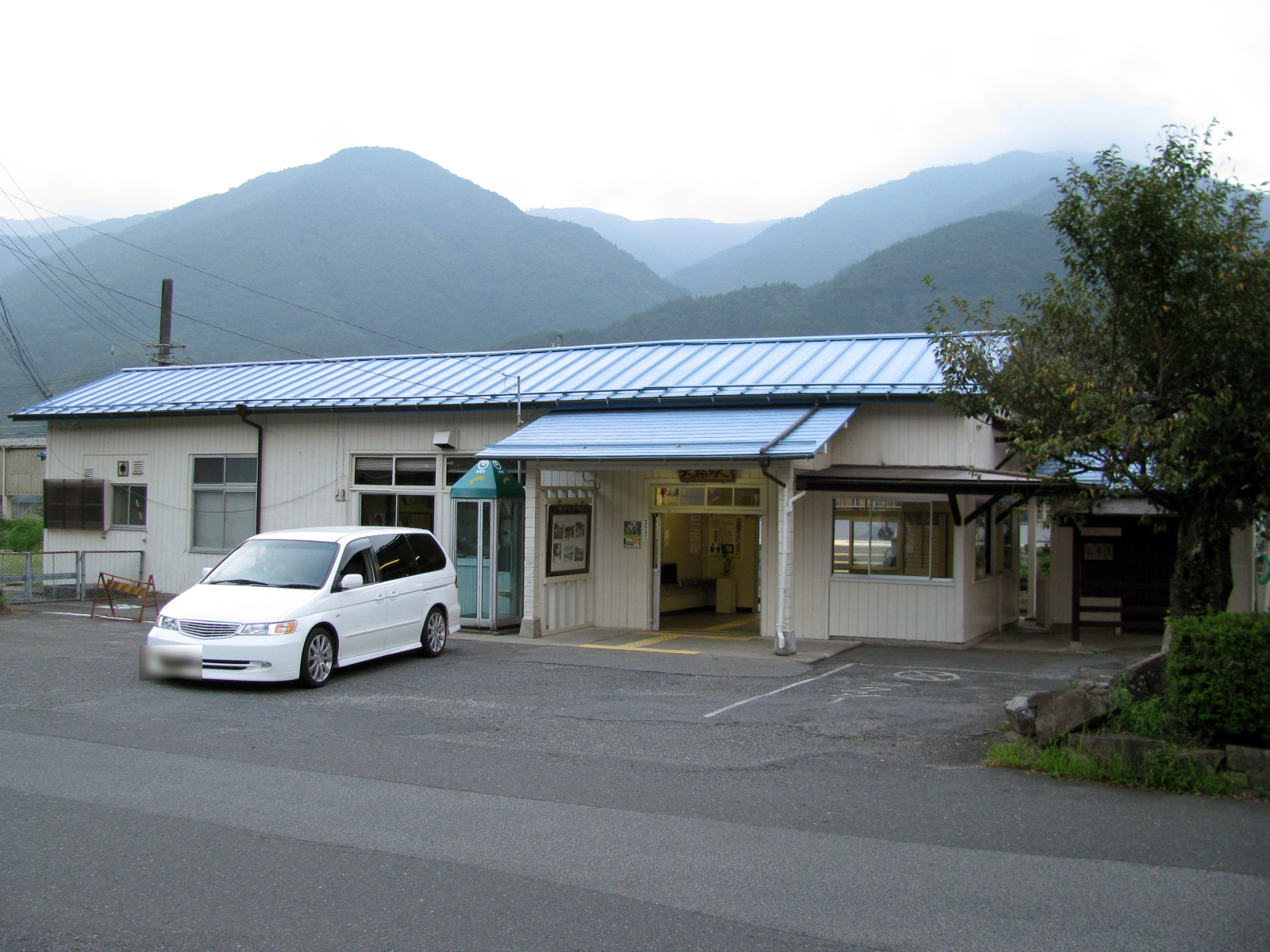
- Ōkuwa Station in September 2008

General information
- Location: Nakano, Ōkuwa-mura, Kiso-gun, Nagano-ken 399-5503; Japan
- Coordinates: 35°41′04″N 137°39′51″E
- Elevation: 527.2 meters
- Operator: JR Central
- Line: Chūō Main Line
- Distance: 285.8 km from Tokyo
- Platforms: 2 side platforms
- Tracks: 2

Other information
- Status: Staffed

History
- Opened: 1 September 1951; 74 years ago

Passengers
- FY2015: 112 daily
Location
- Location within Nagano Prefecture Location within Japan

Ōkuwa Station (大桑駅, Ōkuwa-eki) in the village of Ōkuwa, Nagano Prefecture, Japan, operated by Central Japan Railway Company (JR Tōkai).

== Lines ==
Ōkuwa Station is served by the JR Tōkai Chūō Main Line, and is located 285.8 kilometers from the official starting point of the line at Tokyo and 111.1 kilometers from Nagoya.

== Layout ==
The station has one ground-level side platform and one island platform connected by a footbridge with the wooden station building, which dates from the 1909 construction of the station. The station is staffed.

=== Platforms ===
1	■ Chūō Main Line	For Nakatsugawa and Nagoya
2, 3	■ Chūō Main Line	For Kiso-Fukushima and Nagano

== Adjacent stations ==
←	Service	→
JR Central Chūō Main Line
Suhara	Local	Nojiri

== History ==
Nojiri Station was opened on 1 September 1951. On 1 April 1987, it became part of JR Tōkai.

== Passenger statistics ==
In fiscal 2015, the station was used by an average of 112 passengers daily (boarding passengers only).

== Surrounding area ==
- Ōkuwa village hall
- Ōkuwa Post Office
- Kiso River
- National Route 19

== See also ==
- List of railway stations in Japan
