= Nagiso Station =

Railway station in Nagiso, Nagano Prefecture, Japan

CF23 Nagiso Station 南木曽駅
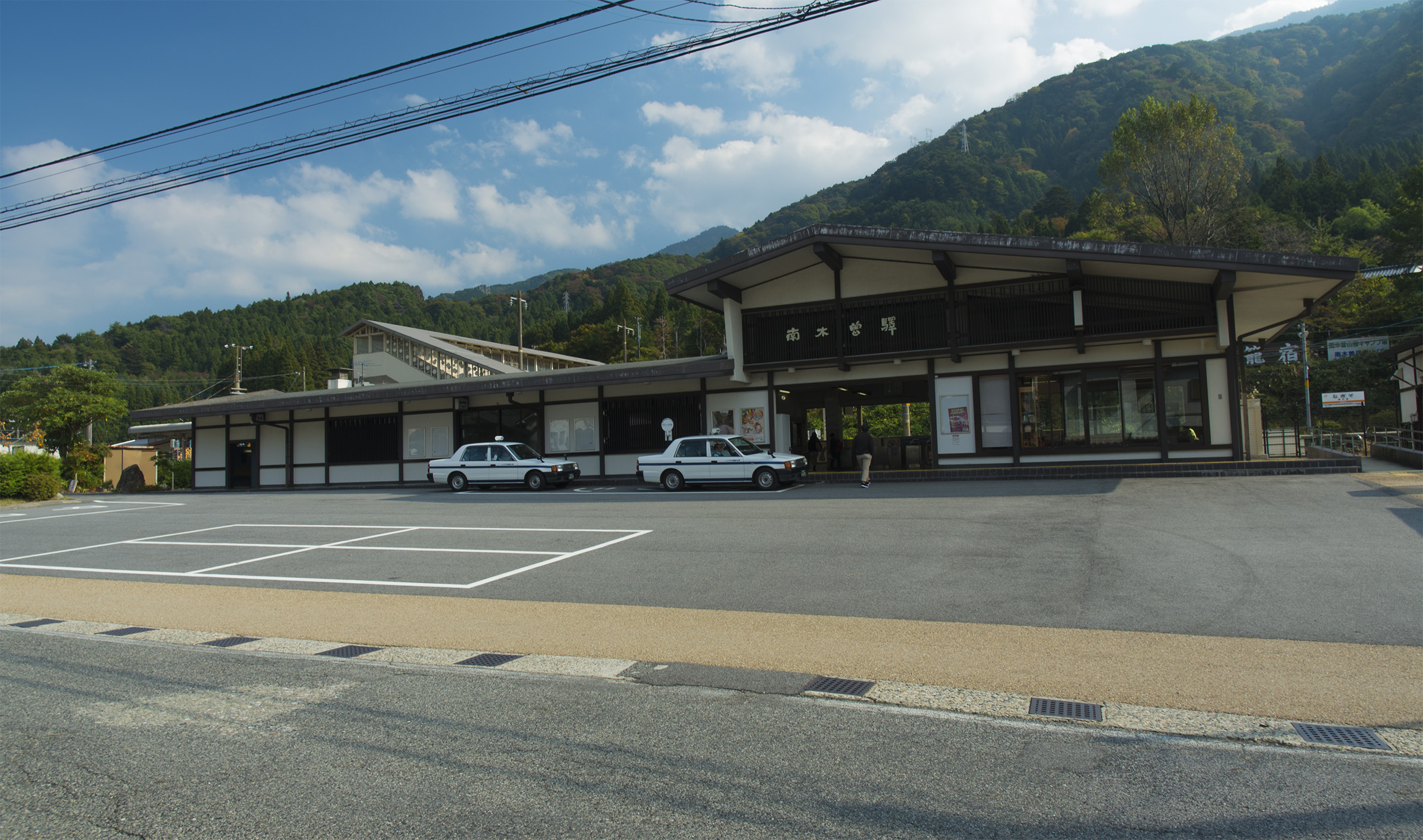
- Nagiso Station, June 2013

General information
- Location: Yomikaki, Nagiso-machi, Kiso-gun, Nagano-ken 399-5301; Japan
- Coordinates: 35.5985°N 137.6085°E
- Elevation: 408.1 meters
- Operator: JR Central
- Line: Chūō Main Line
- Distance: 298.0 km from Tokyo
- Platforms: 1 side +1 island platform
- Tracks: 3

Other information
- Status: Staffed
- Station code: CF23

History
- Former names: Midono (until 1968)

Passengers
- FY2015: 303 daily
Location
- Location within Nagano Prefecture Location within Japan

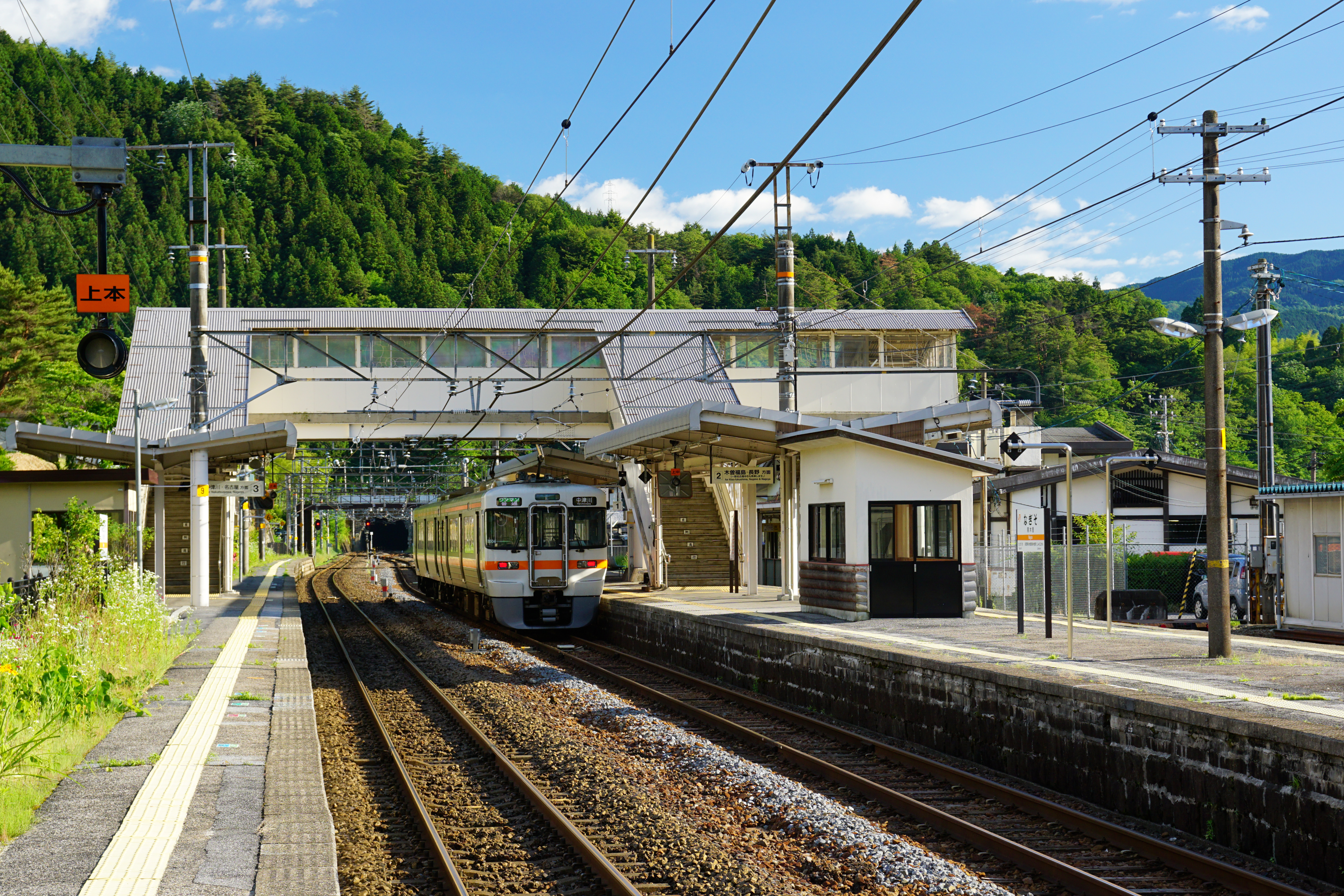
View from platform 3

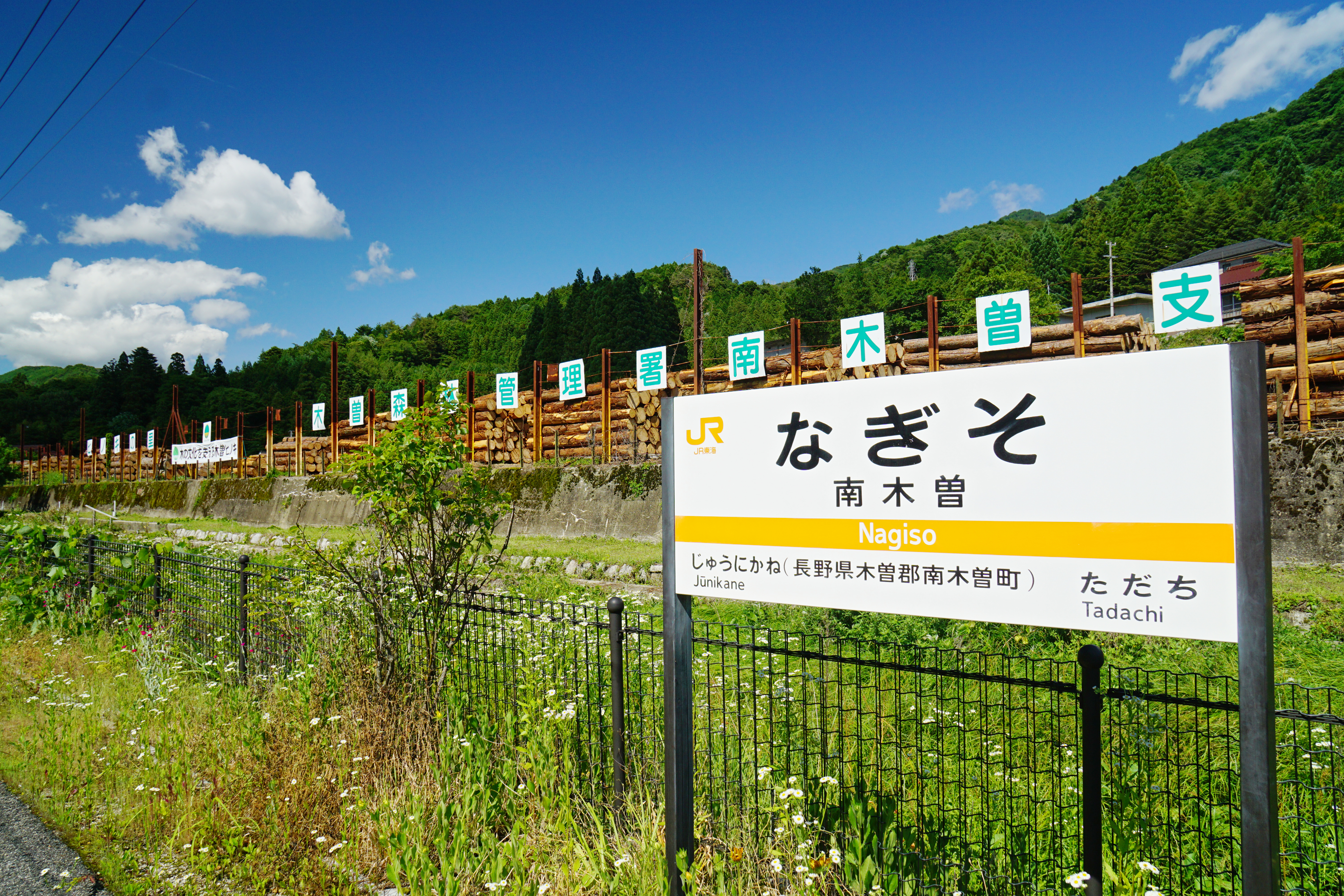
Station sign

Nagiso Station (南木曽駅, Nagiso-eki) is a railway station in the town of Nagiso, Nagano Prefecture, Japan, operated by Central Japan Railway Company (JR Tōkai).

== Lines ==
Nagiso Station is served by the JR Tōkai Chūō Main Line, and is located 298.0 kilometers from the official starting point of the line at Tokyo and 98.9 kilometers from Nagoya.

== Layout ==
The station has one side platform and one island platform connected by a footbridge. The station is staffed.

=== Platforms ===
1	■ Chūō Main Line	For Kiso-Fukushima and Nagano
2	■ Chūō Main Line	(starting trains only)
3	■ Chūō Main Line	For Nakatsugawa and Nagoya

== Adjacent stations ==
«	Service	»
Chūō Main Line
Agematsu or Kiso-Fukushima	Limited Express Shinano	Nakatsugawa
Terminus	Rapid	Tadachi
Jūnikane	Local	Tadachi

== History ==
The station opened on 15 July 1909 as Midono Station (三留野駅). It was renamed Nagiso Station on 1 October 1968. With the privatization of JNR on 1 April 1987, the station came under the control of JR Central.

== Passenger statistics ==
In fiscal 2015, the station was used by an average of 303 passengers daily (boarding passengers only).

== Surrounding area ==
- Nagiso Town Hall
- Nagiso Junior High School
- National Route 19

== See also ==
- List of railway stations in Japan
