= Ochiaigawa Station =

Railway station in Nakatsugawa, Gifu Prefecture, Japan

Ochiaigawa Station 落合川駅
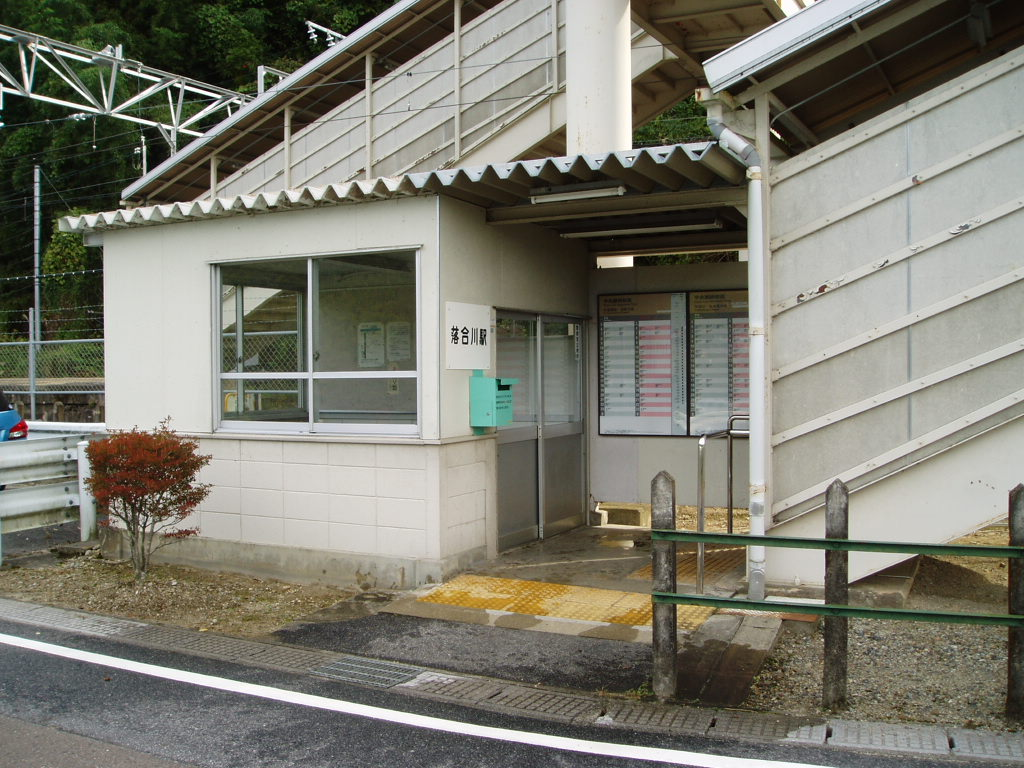
- Ochiaigawa Station, October 2011

General information
- Location: Ochiai, Nakatsugawa-shi, Gifu-ken 508-0006; Japan
- Coordinates: 35.5252°N 137.5303°E
- Operator: JR Central
- Line: Chūō Main Line
- Distance: 313.2 km from Tokyo
- Platforms: 1 island platform
- Tracks: 2

Other information
- Status: Unstaffed

History
- Opened: 27 November 1917; 108 years ago
Location
- Location within Gifu Prefecture Location within Japan

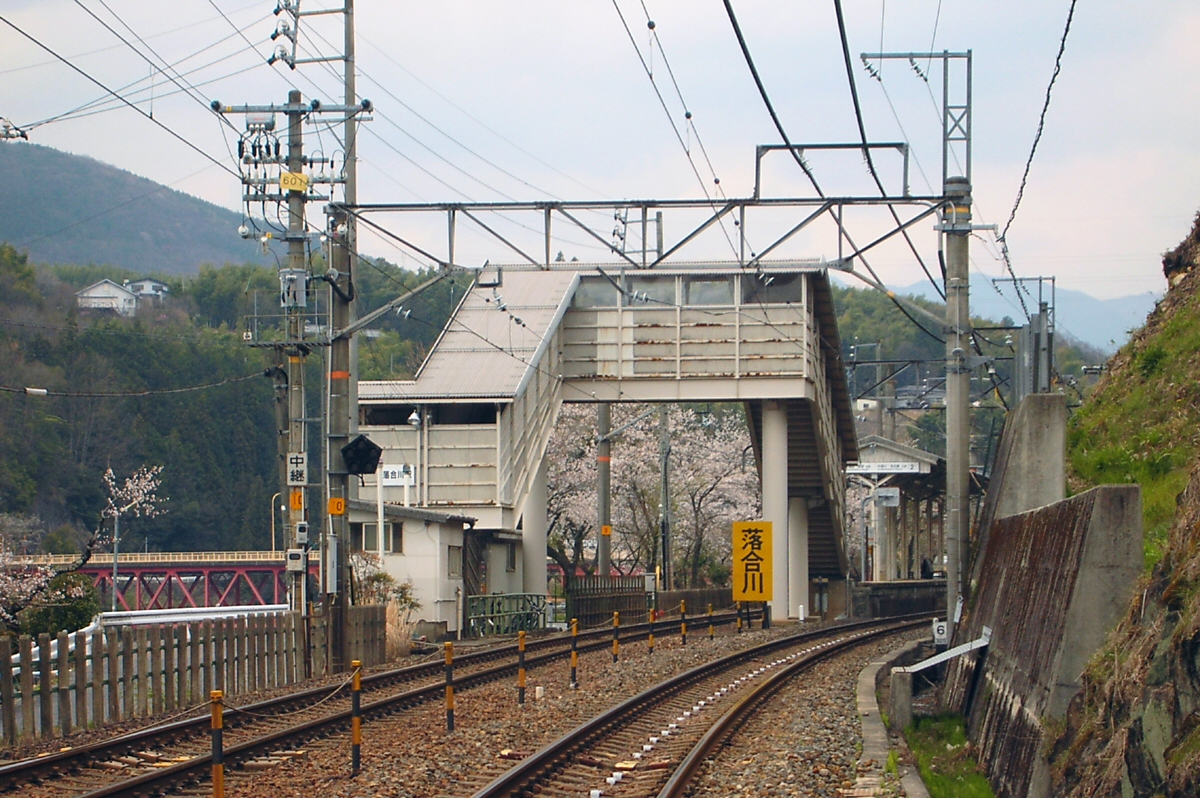
Ochiaigawa Station(from the south side)

Ochiaigawa Station (落合川駅, Ochiaigawa-eki) is a railway station in the city of Nakatsugawa City, Gifu Prefecture, Japan, operated by Central Japan Railway Company (JR Tōkai).

== Lines ==
Ochiaigawa Station is served by the JR Tōkai Chūō Main Line, and is located 313.2 kilometers from the official starting point of the line at Tokyo and 83.7 kilometers from Nagoya.

== Layout ==
The station has one ground-level island platform connected to the station building by a footbridge. The station is unattended.

=== Platforms ===
1	■ Chūō Main Line	For Kiso-Fukushima and Nagano
2	■ Chūō Main Line	For Nakatsugawa and Nagoya

== Adjacent stations ==
←	Service	→
JR Central Chūō Main Line
Sakashita	Local	Nakatsugawa

== History ==
Ochiaigawa Station was opened on 27 November 1917. On 1 April 1987, it became part of JR Tōkai.

== Surrounding area ==
- Site of Ochiai-juku

== See also ==
- List of railway stations in Japan
