= 385 series =

Japanese electric multiple unit train type

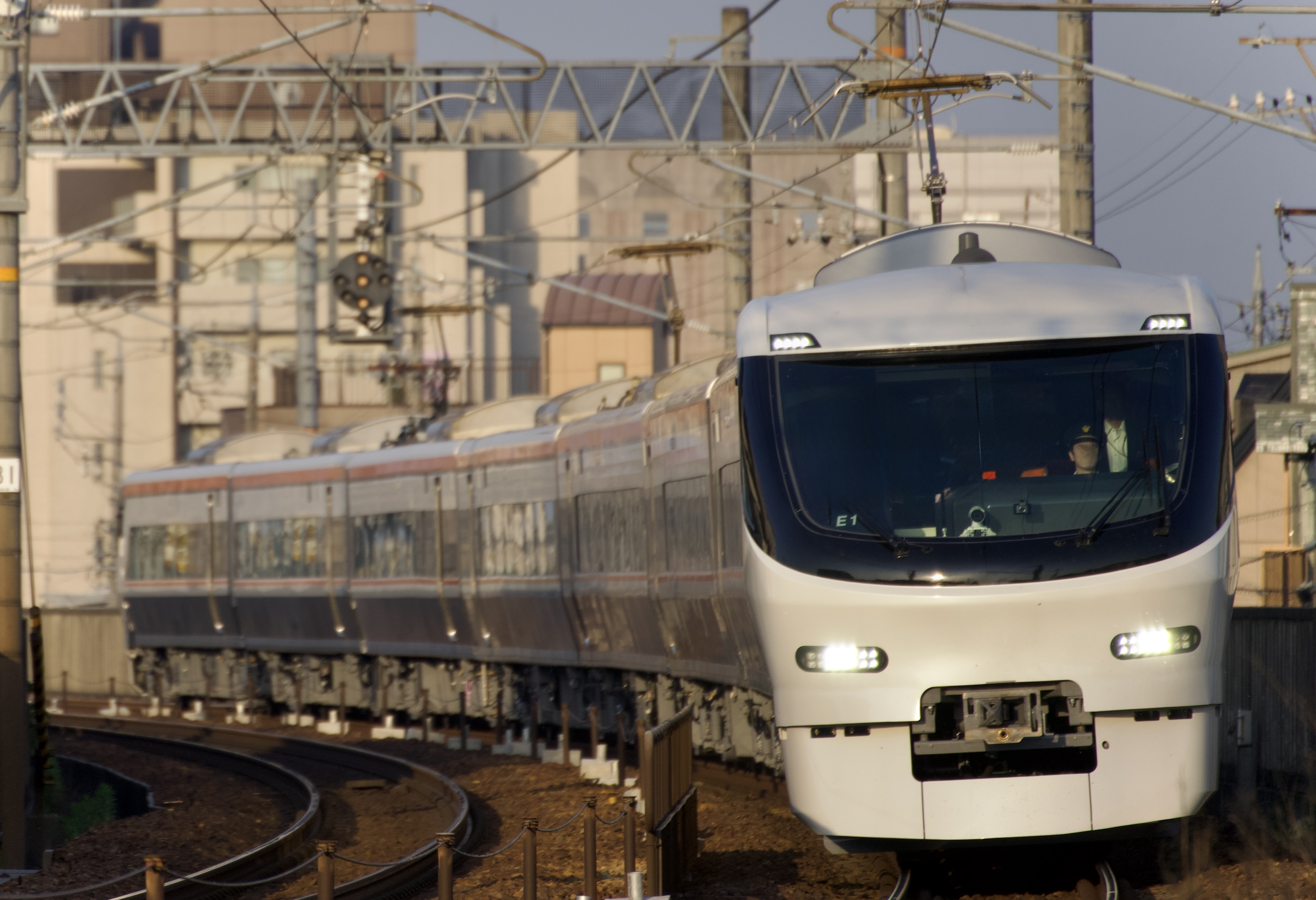
- 385 series on the Chūō Main Line in May 2026
- Manufacturers: Nippon Sharyo; Kawasaki Railcar Mfg.
- Replaced: 383 series
- Constructed: 2026–
- Entered service: Planned for fiscal 2029
- Number built: 8 vehicles
- Formation: 8 cars (pre-production set)
- Fleet numbers: E1
- Operator: JR Central

The 385 series (385系, 385-kei) is a tilting electric multiple unit (EMU) train type on order by Central Japan Railway Company (JR Central).

== Overview ==
Details of the 385 series were first announced by JR Central on 20 July 2023. The 385 series is intended to replace the ageing 383 series fleet on Shinano limited express services. They will feature an improved pendular tilt system, which will allow for faster speeds on curves.

On 22 December 2025, JR Central announced that Kawasaki Railcar Manufacturing and Nippon Sharyo would be involved in manufacturing the pre-production set. The first two pre-production cars, KuHa 384‑1 and MoHa 385‑301, were delivered from the Kawasaki Railcar Manufacturing plant in Hyōgo in 2026. The completed set, numbered E1, was delivered from Nippon Sharyo and underwent test runs in April of that year. A full-production fleet is scheduled to enter revenue service in fiscal year 2029.

== Interior ==
Green (first class) cars feature transverse seating in a 1+2 configuration. Ordinary class cars also feature transverse seating except in a 2+2 configuration. The interior design reflects the different facets and geological features in which the line passes through.
