= Kuramoto Station =

Kuramoto Station is the name of two train stations in Japan:

- Kuramoto Station (Nagano) (倉本駅)
- Kuramoto Station (Tokushima) (蔵本駅)
