= Suhara Station =

Suhara Station is the name of two train stations in Japan:

- Suhara Station (Gifu) (洲原駅)
- Suhara Station (Nagano) (須原駅)
