= Suhara Station (Nagano) =

Railway station in Ōkuwa, Nagano Prefecture, Japan

Suhara Station 須原駅
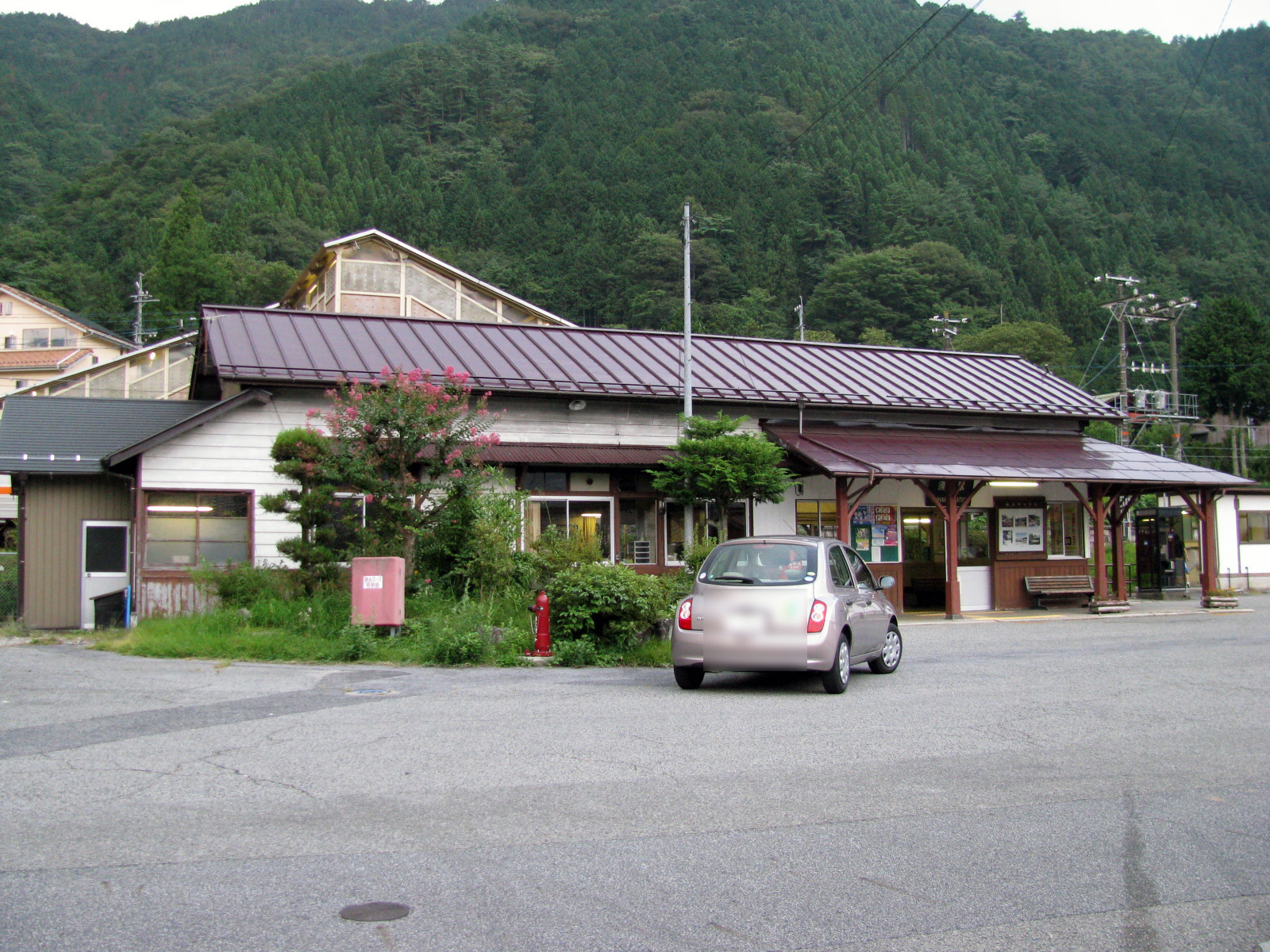
- Suhara Station in September 2008

General information
- Location: Suhara, Ōkuwa-mura, Kiso-gun, Nagano-ken 399-5502; Japan
- Coordinates: 35.6974°N 137.6952°E
- Elevation: 562.9 meters
- Operator: JR Central
- Line: Chūō Main Line
- Distance: 282.5 km from Tokyo
- Platforms: 1 island platform
- Tracks: 2

Other information
- Status: Unstaffed

History
- Opened: 1 December 1909; 116 years ago

Passengers
- FY2015: 48 daily
Location
- Location within Nagano Prefecture Location within Japan

Suhara Station (須原駅, Suhara-eki) is a railway station in the village of Ōkuwa, Nagano Prefecture, Japan, operated by Central Japan Railway Company (JR Tōkai).

== Lines ==
Suhara Station is served by the JR Tōkai Chūō Main Line, and is located 282.5 kilometers from the official starting point of the line at Tokyo and 114.4 kilometers from Nagoya.

== Layout ==
The station has one ground-level island platform connected by a footbridge with the wooden station building, which dates from the 1909 construction of the station.

=== Platforms ===
1	■ Chūō Main Line	For Kiso-Fukushima and Nagano
2	■ Chūō Main Line	For Nakatsugawa and Nagoya

== Adjacent stations ==
←	Service	→
JR Central Chūō Main Line
Kuramoto	Local	Ōkuwa

== History ==
Suhara Station was opened on 1 December 1909. On 1 April 1987, it became part of JR Tōkai.

== Passenger statistics ==
In fiscal 2015, the station was used by an average of 48 passengers daily (boarding passengers only).

== Surrounding area ==
- Suhara Post Office
- Kiso River
- National Route 19
- Suhara-juku (Nakasendō)

== See also ==
- List of railway stations in Japan
