= Ōkuwa Station =

Ōkuwa Station (大桑駅) is the name of two train stations in Japan:

- Ōkuwa Station (Nagano)
- Ōkuwa Station (Tochigi)
