= Kuramoto Station (Nagano) =

Railway station in Agematsu, Nagano Prefecture, Japan

Kuramoto Station 倉本駅
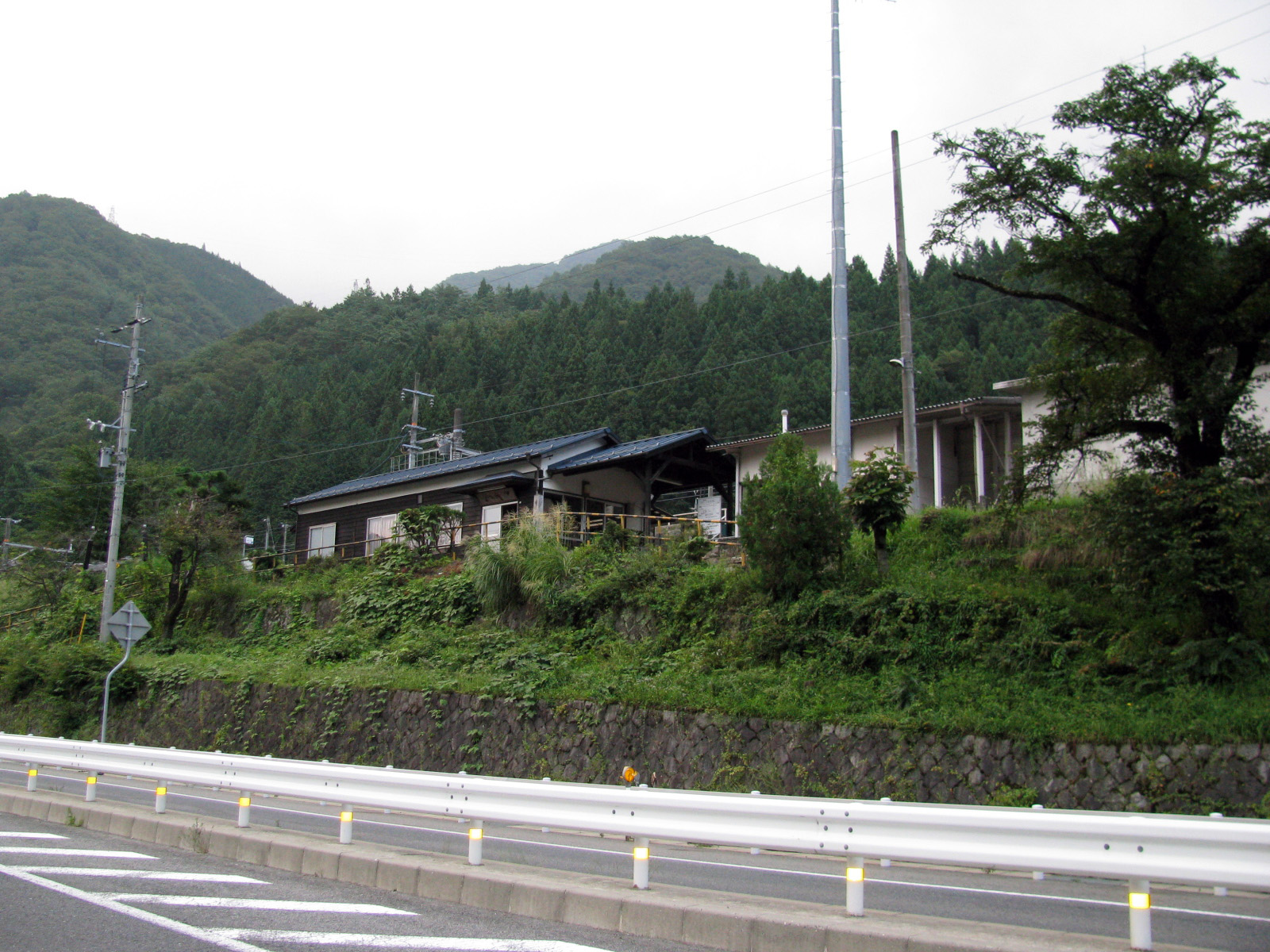
- Kuramoto Station in September 2008

General information
- Location: Ogihara, Agematsu-machi, Kiso-gun, Nagano-ken 399-5608; Japan
- Coordinates: 35.7330°N 137.7141°E
- Elevation: 610.1 meters
- Operator: JR Central
- Line: Chūō Main Line
- Distance: 277.7 km from Tokyo
- Platforms: 2 side platforms
- Tracks: 2

Other information
- Status: Unstaffed

History
- Opened: 1 September 1948; 78 years ago

Passengers
- FY2015: 19 daily
Location
- Location within Nagano Prefecture Location within Japan

Kuramoto Station (倉本駅, Kuramoto-eki) is a railway station in the town of Agematsu, Nagano Prefecture, Japan, operated by Central Japan Railway Company (JR Tōkai).

== Lines ==
Kuramoto Station is served by the JR Tōkai Chūō Main Line, and is located 277.7 kilometers from the official starting point of the line at Tokyo and 119.2 kilometers from Nagoya.

== Layout ==
The station has two opposed ground-level side platforms connected by a level crossing. The station is unattended.

=== Platforms ===
1	■ Chūō Main Line	For Kiso-Fukushima and Nagano
2	■ Chūō Main Line	For Nakatsugawa and Nagoya

== Adjacent stations ==
←	Service	→
JR Central Chūō Main Line
Agematsu	Local	Suhara

== History ==
Kuramoto Station began as "Tachimachi Signal Stop" on 1 May 1914. It was elevated to a full passenger station on 1 September 1948. On 1 April 1987, it became part of JR Tōkai.

== Passenger statistics ==
In fiscal 2015, the station was used by an average of 19 passengers daily (boarding passengers only).

== Surrounding area ==
- Kiso River
- National Route 19

== See also ==
- List of railway stations in Japan
