= Chikusa Station =

Railway and metro station in Nagoya, Japan

CF03 H12 Chikusa Station 千種駅
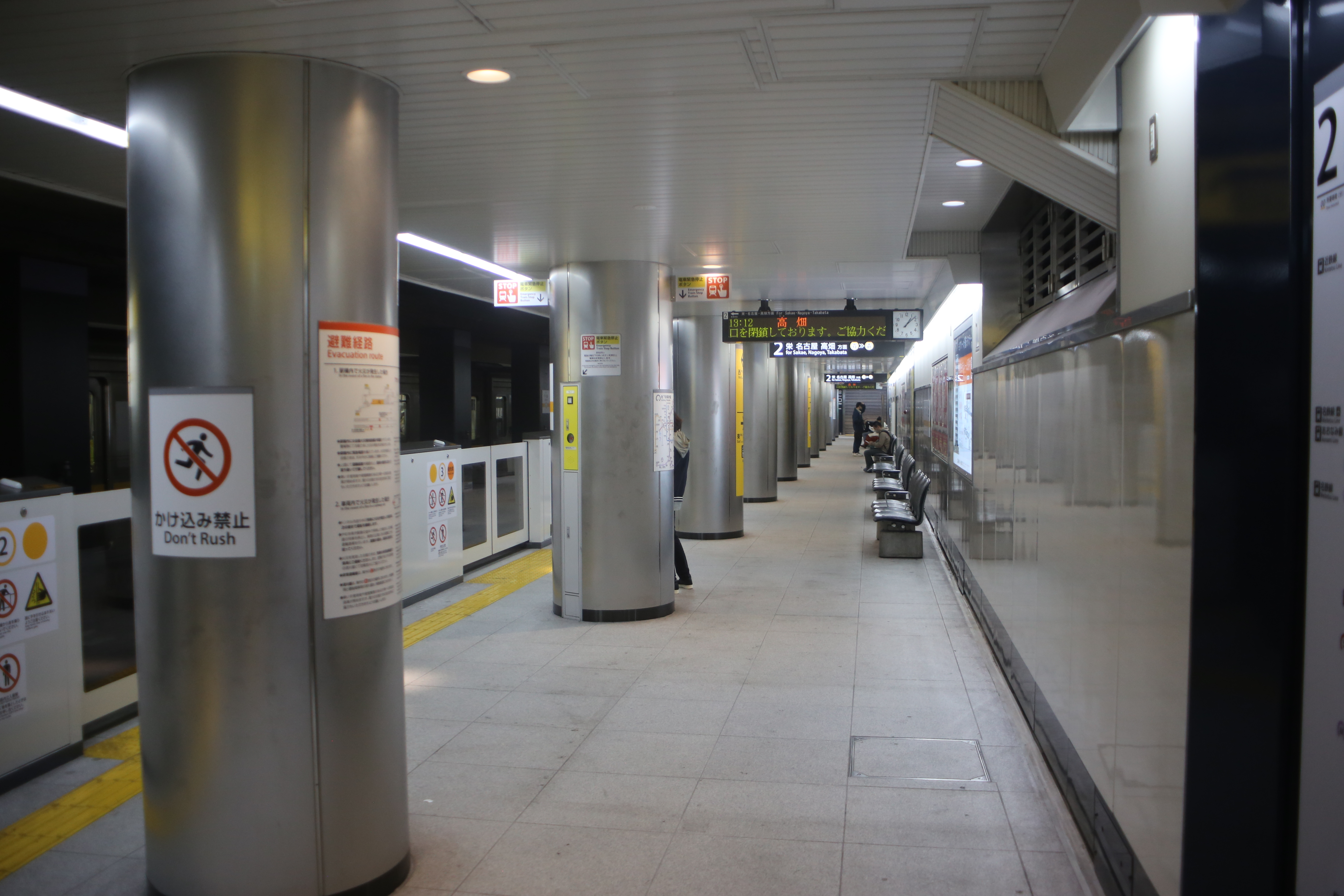

General information
- Location: Uchiyama 3-24-8, Chikusa-ku, Nagoya-she, Aichi-ken; Japan
- Coordinates: 35.1701424°N 136.930697°E
- System: Mainline and Nagoya Municipal Subway station
- Operator: JR Central; Transportation Bureau City of Nagoya
- Lines: Chūō Main Line; Higashiyama Line
- Platforms: 1 island + 2 side platforms

Other information
- Station code: CF03, H12
- Website: Official website (JR Tokai); Official website (Nagoya Subway)

History
- Opened: 25 July 1900; 126 years ago

Passengers
- FY2017: 19,892 daily (JR Central), 14,234 (Subway)

Services
Preceding station	Nagoya Municipal Subway	Following station
Shinsakae-machi H11 towards Takabata	Higashiyama Line	Imaike H13 towards Fujigaoka
Location
- Location within Aichi Prefecture Location within Japan

Chikusa Station (千種駅, Chikusa-eki) is an interchange railway station in Higashi-ku and Chikusa-ku, Nagoya, Aichi Prefecture, Japan, operated by Central Japan Railway Company (JR Tōkai) and the Transportation Bureau City of Nagoya.

== Lines ==
The above-ground portion off Chikusa Station is served by the Chūō Main Line, and is located 389.8 kilometers from the starting point of the line at Tokyo Station and 7.1 kilometers from Nagoya Station. the underground portion of the station is served by the Higashiyama Line of the Nagoya Municipal Subway and is 11.0 kilometers from the starting point of that line at Takabata Station.

== Layout ==
The JR station has one elevated island platform with the station building underneath. The station building has automated ticket machines, TOICA automated turnstiles and a staffed ticket office. The underground portion the station has two opposed side platforms. The station building has automated ticket machines, Manaca automated turnstiles and a staffed ticket office.

=== Platforms (JR Central) ===
1	■ Chūō Main Line	For Kanayama and Nagoya
2	■ Chūō Main Line	For Kōzōji, Tajimi, Nakatsugawa, and Nagano

=== Platforms (Nagoya Municipal Subway) ===
1	■ Higashiyama Line	For Higashiyama Kōen and Fujigaoka
2	■ Higashiyama Line	For Sakae, Nagoya, Takabata

== Adjacent stations ==
«	Service	»
JR Central
Chūō Main Line
Ōzone	Local	Tsurumai
Tajimi	Limited Express Shinano	Kanayama or Nagoya

== Station history ==
The JR portion of the station opened on 25 July 1900. The subway portion of the station opened on 15 June 1960.

== Passenger statistics ==
In fiscal 2017, the JR portion of the station was used by an average of 19,892 passengers daily and the Nagoya Subway portion of the station by 14,234 passengers daily.

== Surrounding area ==
The station is located near the border of Chikusa-ku, Higashi-ku and Naka-ku.

== See also ==
- List of railway stations in Japan
