= Agematsu Station =

Railway station in Agematsu, Nagano Prefecture, Japan

CF29 Agematsu Station 上松駅
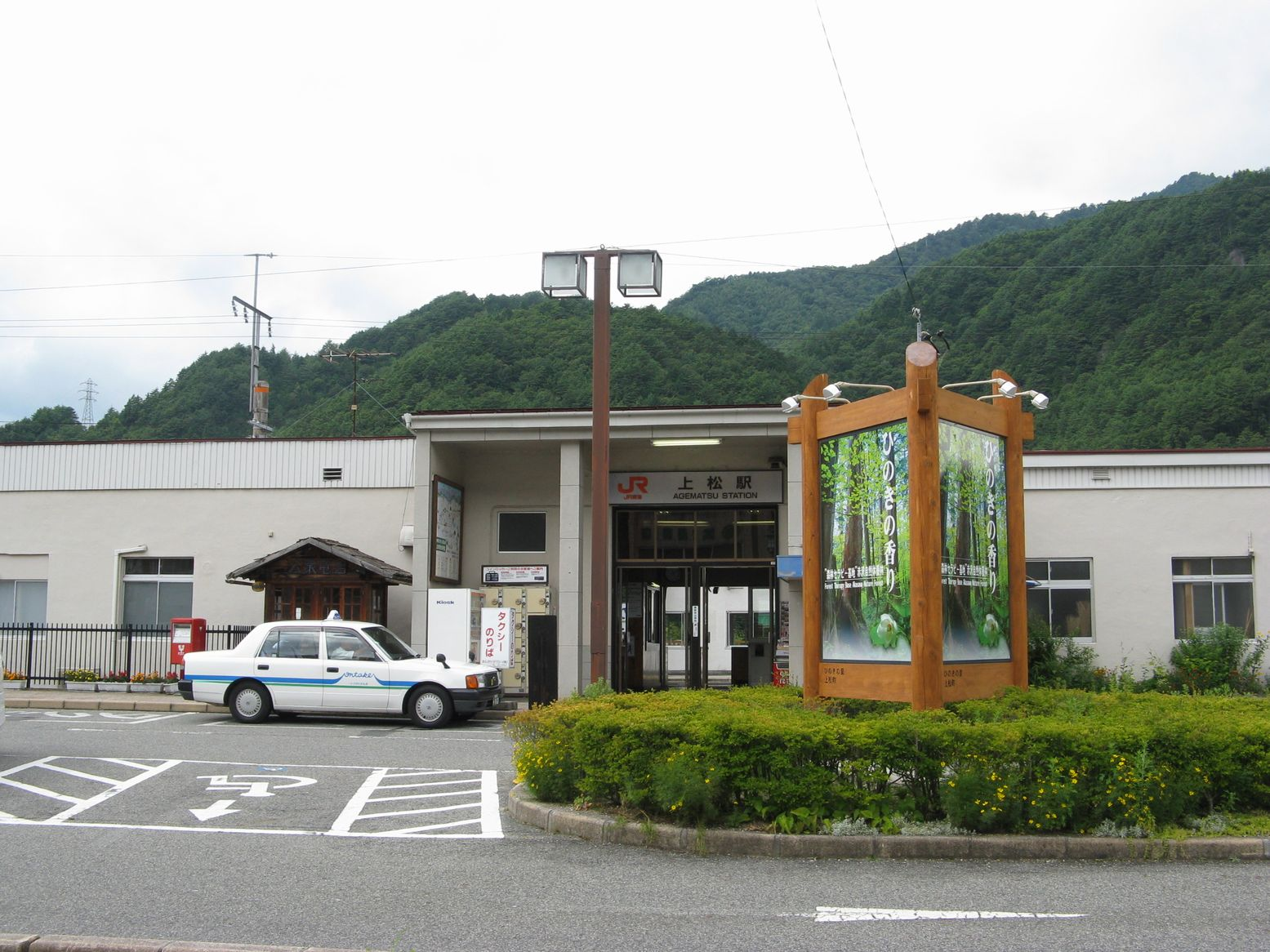
- Agematsu Station in September 2008

General information
- Location: Agematsu-machi, Kiso-gun, Nagano-ken 399-5601; Japan
- Coordinates: 35.7843°N 137.6931°E
- Elevation: 708.6 meters
- Operator: JR Central
- Line: Chūō Main Line
- Distance: 271.1 km from Tokyo
- Platforms: 1 side + 1 island platform
- Tracks: 3

Other information
- Status: Staffed
- Station code: CF29

History
- Opened: 5 October 1910; 116 years ago

Passengers
- FY2015: 189 daily

Services
Preceding station	JR Central	Following station
Nakatsugawa CF19 towards Nagoya	Shinano	Kiso-Fukushima CF30 towards Shiojiri
Nagiso CF23 towards Nagoya	Shinano	Kiso-Fukushima CF30 towards Shiojiri
Kuramoto towards Nagoya	Chūō Main Line	Kiso-Fukushima CF30 towards Shiojiri
Location
- Location within Nagano Prefecture Location within Japan

Agematsu Station (上松駅, Agematsu-eki) is a railway station in the town of Agematsu, Nagano Prefecture, Japan, operated by Central Japan Railway Company (JR Tōkai).

== Lines ==
Agematsu Station is served by the JR Tōkai Chūō Main Line, and is located 271.1 kilometers from the official starting point of the line at Tokyo and 125.8 kilometers from Nagoya.

== Layout ==
The station has one side platform and one island platform connected by a footbridge. The station is staffed.

=== Platforms ===
1	■ Chūō Main Line	For Nakatsugawa and Nagoya
2	■ Chūō Main Line	starting trains and express trains only
3	■ Chūō Main Line	For Kiso-Fukushima and Nagano

== History ==
Agematsu Station was opened on 5 October 1910. The current station building was completed in 1951. On 1 April 1987, it became part of JR Tōkai.

== Passenger statistics ==
In fiscal 2015, the station was used by an average of 189 passengers daily (boarding passengers only).

== Surrounding area ==
- Agematsu Town Hall
- Agematsu-juku
- National Route 19

== See also ==
- List of railway stations in Japan
