= Ōkuwa =

Ōkuwa 大桑村
- Village
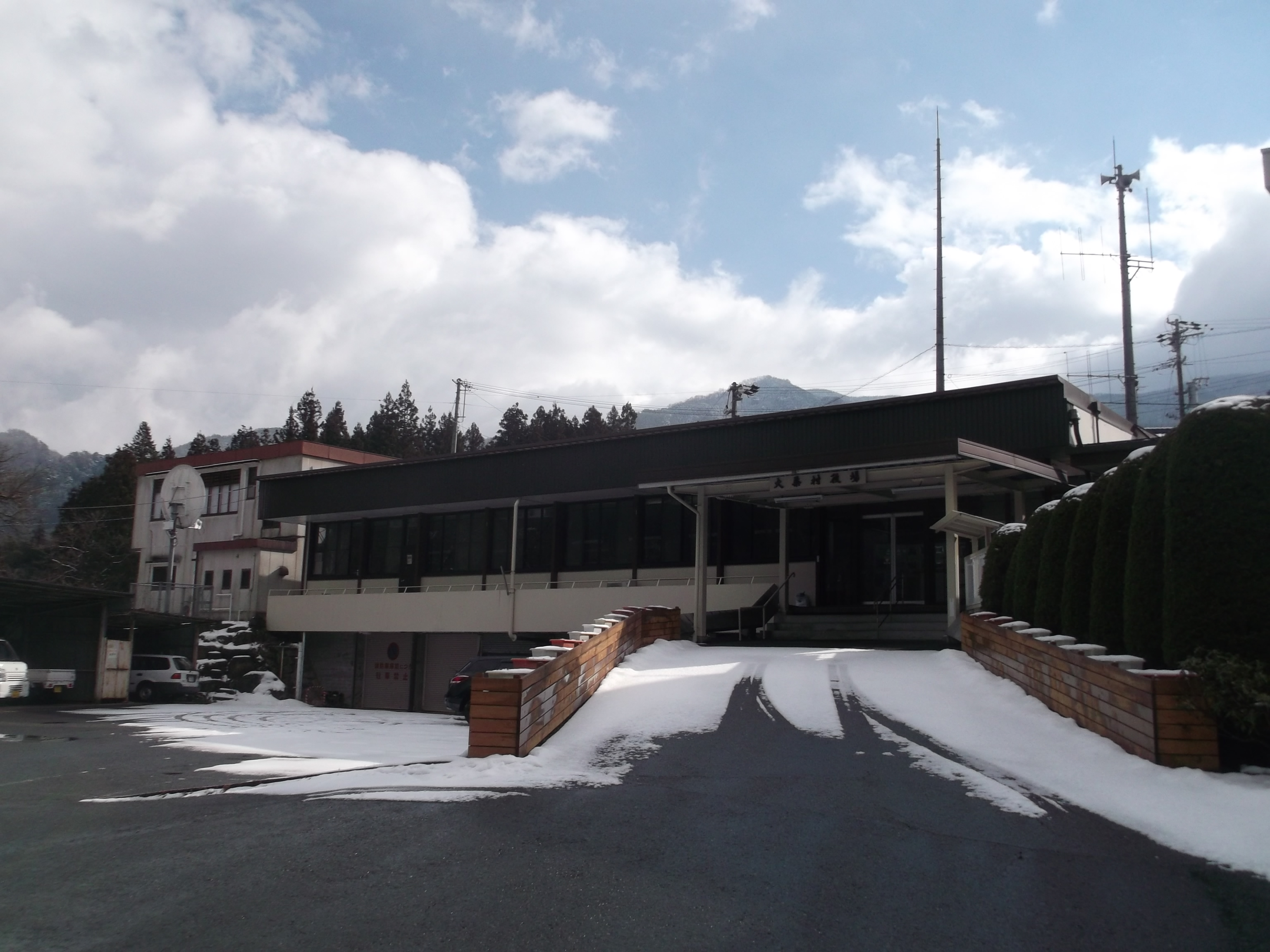
- Ōkuwa Village Hall

- Flag Seal

- Location of Ōkuwa in Nagano Prefecture

- Coordinates: 35°40′58.2″N 137°39′53.9″E
- Country: Japan
- Region: Chūbu (Kōshin'etsu)
- Prefecture: Nagano
- District: Kiso

Area
  - Total: 234.47 km^{2} (90.53 sq mi)

Population (April 2019)
  - Total: 3,693
  - Density: 15.75/km^{2} (40.79/sq mi)
- Time zone: UTC+9 (Japan Standard Time)
- Symbols
  - Tree: Chamaecyparis obtusa
  - Flower: Rhododendron subg. Hymenanthes
- Phone number: 0264-55-3080
- Address: 2778 Nagano, Ōkuwa-mura, Kiso-gun, Nagano-ken 399-5503
- Website: Official website

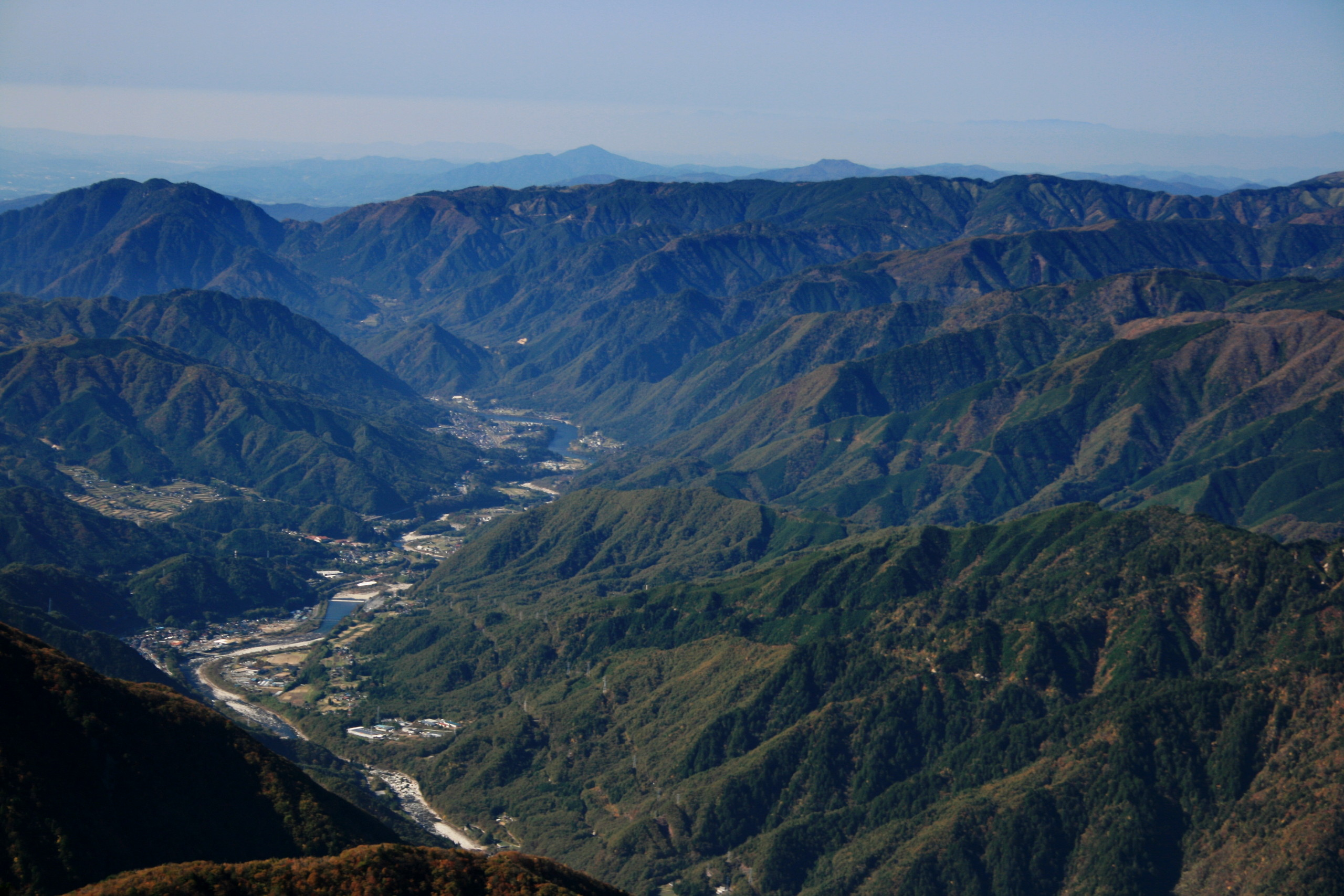
Ōkuwa village form Mount Doppo

Ōkuwa (大桑村, Ōkuwa-mura) is a village located in Nagano Prefecture, Japan. As of 1 April 2019, the village had an estimated population of 3,693 in 1558 households, and a population density of 16 persons per km^{2}. The total area of the village is 234.47 square kilometres (90.53 sq mi).

== Geography ==
Ōkuwa is located in the Kiso Mountains of southwest Nagano Prefecture, bordered by the Atera Mountains to the west. The Kiso River flows through the village. Mount Utsugi (2864 meters) and Mount Minamikoma (2841 meters) are on the border of the village.

=== Surrounding municipalities ===
- Gifu Prefecture
  - Nakatsugawa
- Nagano Prefecture
  - Agematsu
  - Iida
  - Iijima
  - Komagane
  - Nagiso
  - Ōtaki

=== Climate ===
The town has a climate characterized by characterized by hot and humid summers, and cold winters (Köppen climate classification Cfa). The average annual temperature in Ōkuwa is 12.6 °C. The average annual rainfall is 1680 mm with September as the wettest month. The temperatures are highest on average in August, at around 25.1 °C, and lowest in January, at around 0.4 °C.

== Demographics ==
Per Japanese census data, the population of Ōkuwa has decreased over the past 60 years.

Historical population
Year	Pop.	±%
1940	6,274	—
1950	7,362	+17.3%
1960	7,994	+8.6%
1970	6,338	−20.7%
1980	5,637	−11.1%
1990	5,160	−8.5%
2000	4,770	−7.6%
2010	4,146	−13.1%
2020	3,439	−17.1%

== History ==
The area of present-day Ōkuwa was part of ancient Shinano Province. The area developed as Suhara-juku and Nojiri-shuku two post stations on the Nakasendō highway connecting Edo with Kyoto during the Edo period. The present village of Ōkuwa was established on April 1, 1889 by the establishment of the modern municipalities system.

== Education ==
Ōkuwa has one public elementary school and one public middle school operated by the town government. The village does not have a high school.

== Transportation ==
=== Railway ===
- [JR Tōkai - Chūō Main Line
  - Suhara - Ōkuwa - Nojiri

=== Highway ===
- National Route 19

== International relations ==
- (United States) – Shelbyville, Illinois, USA, sister city
