= Nagiso =

Nagiso 南木曽町
- Town
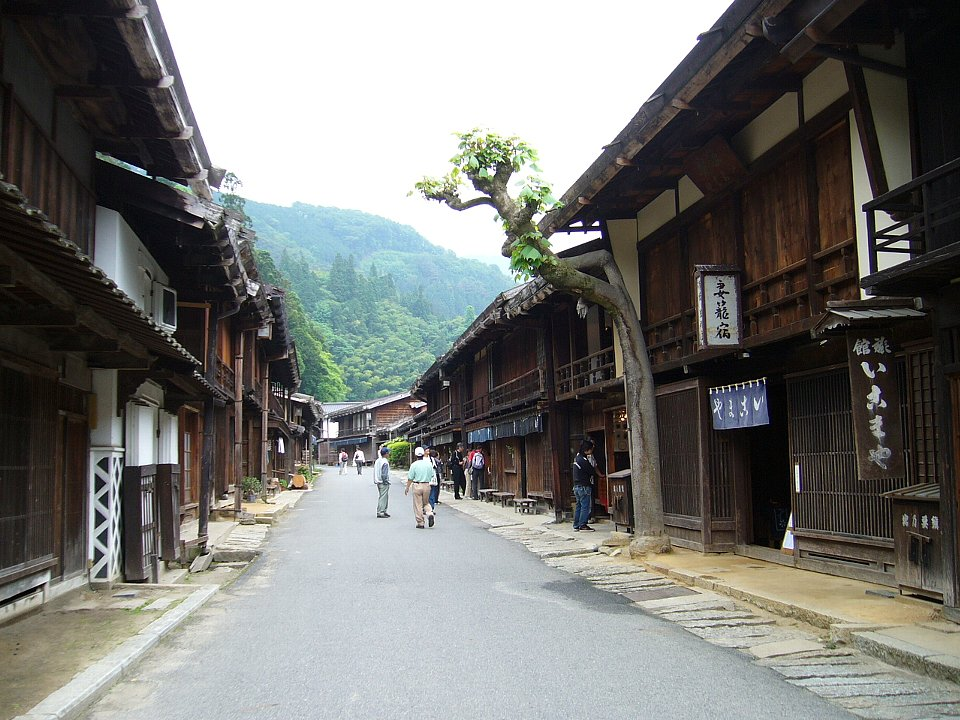
- Tsumago-juku in Nagiso

- Flag Seal

- Location of Nagiso in Nagano Prefecture

- Coordinates: 35°36′13.2″N 137°36′31.8″E
- Country: Japan
- Region: Chūbu (Kōshin'etsu)
- Prefecture: Nagano
- District: Kiso

Area
  - Total: 215.93 km^{2} (83.37 sq mi)

Population (April 2019)
  - Total: 4,111
  - Density: 19.04/km^{2} (49.31/sq mi)
- Time zone: UTC+9 (Japan Standard Time)
- Phone number: 0264-57-2001
- Address: 3668-1 Yomikaki, Nagiso-machi, Kiso-gun, Nagano-ken 399-5301
- Climate: Cfa/Dfa
- Website: Official website
- Symbols
- Flower: Rhododendron
- Tree: Chamaecyparis obtusa

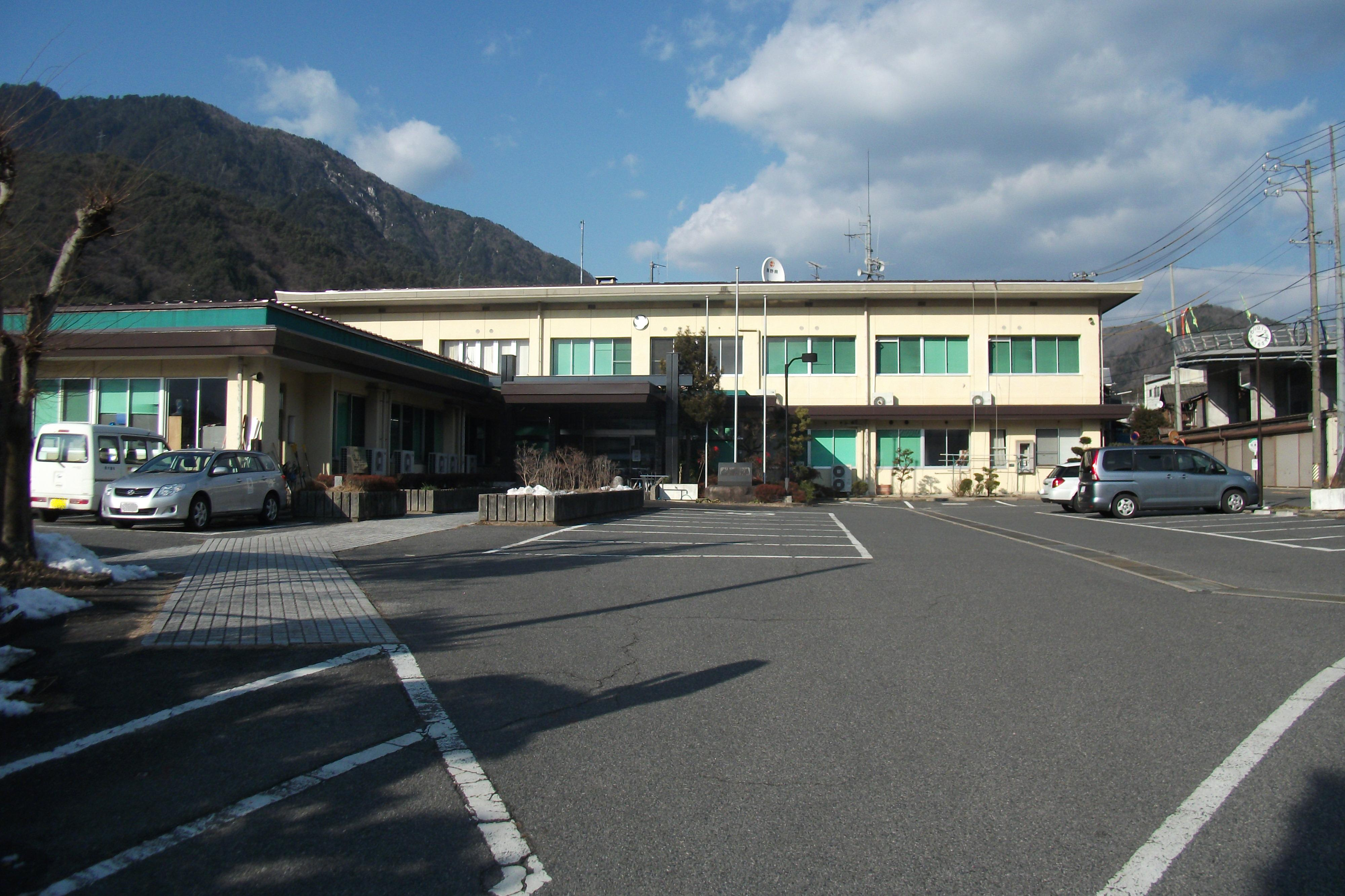
Nagiso Town Hall

Nagiso (南木曽町, Nagiso-machi) is a town located in Nagano Prefecture, Japan. As of 1 April 2019, the town had an estimated population of 4,111 in 1751 households, and a population density of 19 persons per km^{2}. The total area of the town was 215.93 square kilometres (83.37 sq mi). Nagiso is listed as one of The Most Beautiful Villages in Japan.

== Geography ==
Nagiso is located in the Kiso Valley of southwestern Nagano Prefecture, bordered by Gifu Prefecture to the west. The Kiso River flows through the center of the town.

=== Surrounding municipalities ===
- Gifu Prefecture
  - Nakatsugawa
- Nagano Prefecture
  - Achi
  - Iida
  - Ōkuwa

=== Climate ===
The town has a climate characterized by characterized by hot and humid summers, and cold winters (Köppen climate classification Cfa). The average annual temperature in Nagiso is 11.5 °C (52.7 °F). The average annual rainfall is 2,381.2 mm (93.75 in) with July as the wettest month. The temperatures are highest on average in August, at around 23.5 °C (74.3 °F), and lowest in January, at around −0.6 °C (30.9 °F).

Climate data for Nagiso (1991−2020 normals, extremes 1978−present)
Month	Jan	Feb	Mar	Apr	May	Jun	Jul	Aug	Sep	Oct	Nov	Dec	Year
Record high °C (°F)	14.4 (57.9)	18.6 (65.5)	22.8 (73.0)	27.7 (81.9)	30.7 (87.3)	33.0 (91.4)	35.6 (96.1)	35.7 (96.3)	34.0 (93.2)	29.5 (85.1)	22.5 (72.5)	20.8 (69.4)	35.7 (96.3)
Mean daily maximum °C (°F)	4.6 (40.3)	6.4 (43.5)	11.3 (52.3)	17.3 (63.1)	22.1 (71.8)	24.9 (76.8)	28.3 (82.9)	30.0 (86.0)	25.9 (78.6)	20.0 (68.0)	13.7 (56.7)	7.2 (45.0)	17.6 (63.8)
Daily mean °C (°F)	−0.6 (30.9)	0.4 (32.7)	4.6 (40.3)	10.2 (50.4)	15.2 (59.4)	19.0 (66.2)	22.6 (72.7)	23.5 (74.3)	19.8 (67.6)	13.7 (56.7)	7.5 (45.5)	1.9 (35.4)	11.5 (52.7)
Mean daily minimum °C (°F)	−4.5 (23.9)	−4.3 (24.3)	−0.7 (30.7)	4.2 (39.6)	9.5 (49.1)	14.6 (58.3)	18.7 (65.7)	19.5 (67.1)	15.8 (60.4)	9.5 (49.1)	3.2 (37.8)	−1.8 (28.8)	7.0 (44.6)
Record low °C (°F)	−14.0 (6.8)	−15.3 (4.5)	−11.5 (11.3)	−5.0 (23.0)	−0.3 (31.5)	5.9 (42.6)	11.8 (53.2)	12.3 (54.1)	5.3 (41.5)	−1.2 (29.8)	−4.2 (24.4)	−10.6 (12.9)	−15.3 (4.5)
Average precipitation mm (inches)	107.5 (4.23)	113.8 (4.48)	182.1 (7.17)	181.0 (7.13)	203.3 (8.00)	298.9 (11.77)	365.8 (14.40)	245.9 (9.68)	264.1 (10.40)	186.2 (7.33)	129.2 (5.09)	111.6 (4.39)	2,381.2 (93.75)
Average precipitation days (≥ 1.0 mm)	11.9	9.8	12.2	11.8	12.1	15.5	16.6	13.7	13.1	11.1	9.6	12.0	149.4
Mean monthly sunshine hours	130.6	142.4	168.8	182.9	193.2	148.1	152.8	179.9	146.8	154.8	138.9	130.1	1,872.7
Source: Japan Meteorological Agency

== History ==
The area of present-day Nagiso was part of ancient Shinano Province. During the Edo period, the area developed as series of post stations on the Nakasendō highway connecting Edo with Kyoto. The villages of Yomikaki, Tsumagoi and Tadachi merged to form the town of Nagiso on May 1, 1968.

== Demographics ==
Per Japanese census data, the population of Nagiso has remained declined rapidly over the past 60 years.

Historical population
Year	Pop.	±%
1940	8,551	—
1950	10,258	+20.0%
1960	10,771	+5.0%
1970	8,020	−25.5%
1980	6,680	−16.7%
1990	6,142	−8.1%
2000	5,687	−7.4%
2010	4,810	−15.4%
2020	3,915	−18.6%

== Education ==
Nagiso has one public elementary school and one public middle school operated by the town government, and one high school operated the Nagano Prefectural Board of Education.

== Transportation ==
=== Railway ===
- JR Tōkai - Chūō Main Line
  - Jūnikane - Nagiso - Tadachi

=== Highway ===
- National Route 19
- National Route 256

== Local attractions ==
- Hidachi Falls, one of the 100 Famous Waterfalls of Japan
- Midono-juku
- Tsumago-juku
