= 383 series =

Japanese train type

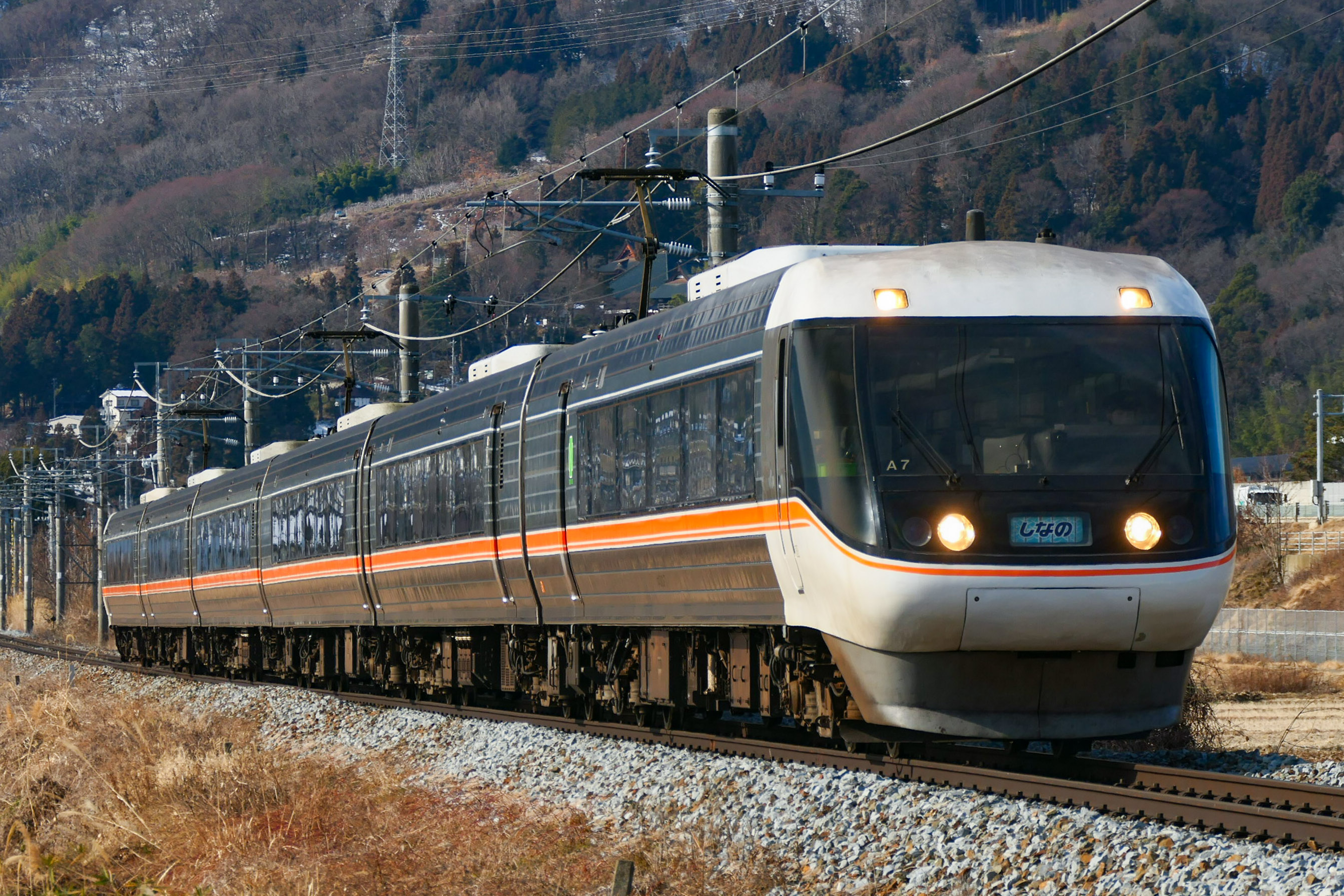
- 383 series train on a Shinano service
- In service: April 1995 – present
- Manufacturers: Hitachi, Kawasaki Heavy Industries, Nippon Sharyo
- Family name: Wide View
- Number built: 76 vehicles; 9 × 6-car; 3 × 4-car; 5 × 2-car
- Successor: 385 series
- Formation: 2/4/6 cars per trainset
- Operator: JR Central
- Depot: Jinryō
- Lines served: Chūō Main Line, Shinonoi Line, Shinetsu Main Line, Ōito Line (seasonal)

Specifications
- Maximum speed: 130 km/h (81 mph)
- Traction system: Variable frequency (GTO) (Toshiba)
- Electric systems: 1,500 V DC (overhead catenary)
- Current collection: C-PS27 single-arm pantograph
- Braking systems: Electronically controlled pneumatic brakes with regenerative or dynamic braking, snow-resistant brake
- Safety system: ATS-ST
- Track gauge: 1,067 mm (3 ft 6 in)

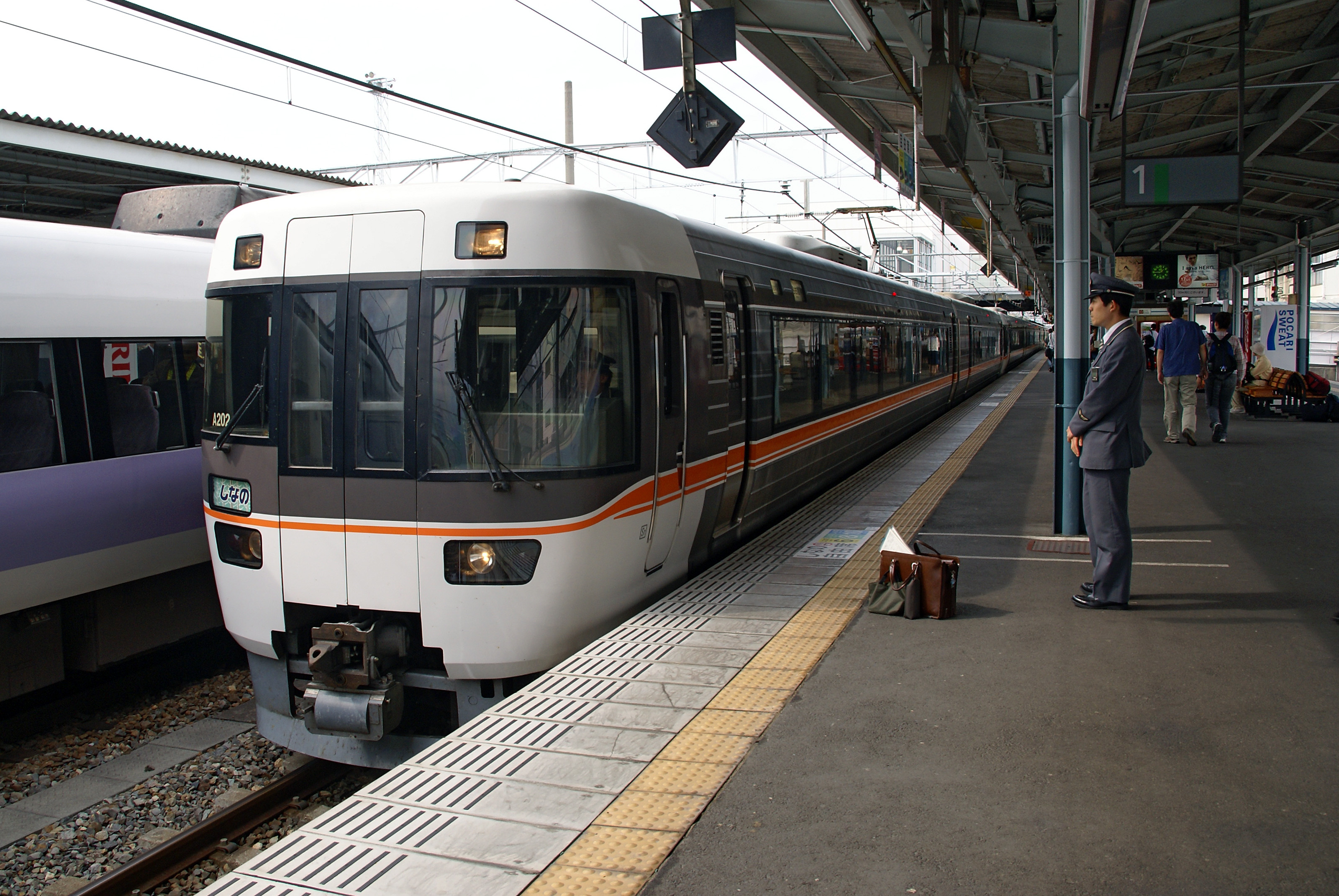
Gangwayed cab end of car

The 383 series (383系) is a tilting DC electric multiple unit (EMU) train type operated by Central Japan Railway Company (JR Central) on the Chūō Main Line, Shinonoi Line and Shinetsu Main Line. They service the Shinano limited express services in Japan, as well as Home Liner. It also won the 1996 Laurel Prize.

== Design ==
The trains were built jointly by Hitachi, Kawasaki Heavy Industries, and Nippon Sharyo.

== Formations ==
=== 6-car sets ===
Car No.	1	2	3	4	5	6
Designation	Tsc1	M1	T	M2	T2	Mc
Numbering	KuRo 383	MoHa 383	SaHa 383	MoHa 383-100	SaHa 383-100	KuMoHa 383

The KuMoHa 383 and MoHa 383 cars are each fitted with one C-PS27 single-arm pantograph.

=== 4-car sets ===
Car No.	1	2	3	4
Designation	Tsc2	M1	T2	Mc
Numbering	KuRo 383-100	MoHa 383	SaHa 383-100	KuMoHa 383

The KuMoHa 383 and MoHa 383 cars are each fitted with one C-PS27 single-arm pantograph.

=== 2-car sets ===
Car No.	1	2
Designation	Tc	Mc
Numbering	KuHa 383	KuMoHa 383

The KuMoHa 383 car is fitted with one C-PS27 single-arm pantograph.

== Operations ==
- (Wide View) Shinano (Nagoya – Nagano)
- Home Liner Nakatsugawa
- Home Liner Tajimi

== History ==
A pre-production 6-car set was completed in August 1994, with a further 70 cars (eight 6-car sets, three 4-car sets, and five 2-car sets) built by October 1996.

The 383 series entered service from April 1995.

== Future ==
The 383 series is planned to be replaced with new 385 series sets on Shinano limited express services from 2026.
