= Shinano (train) =

Japanese express train service

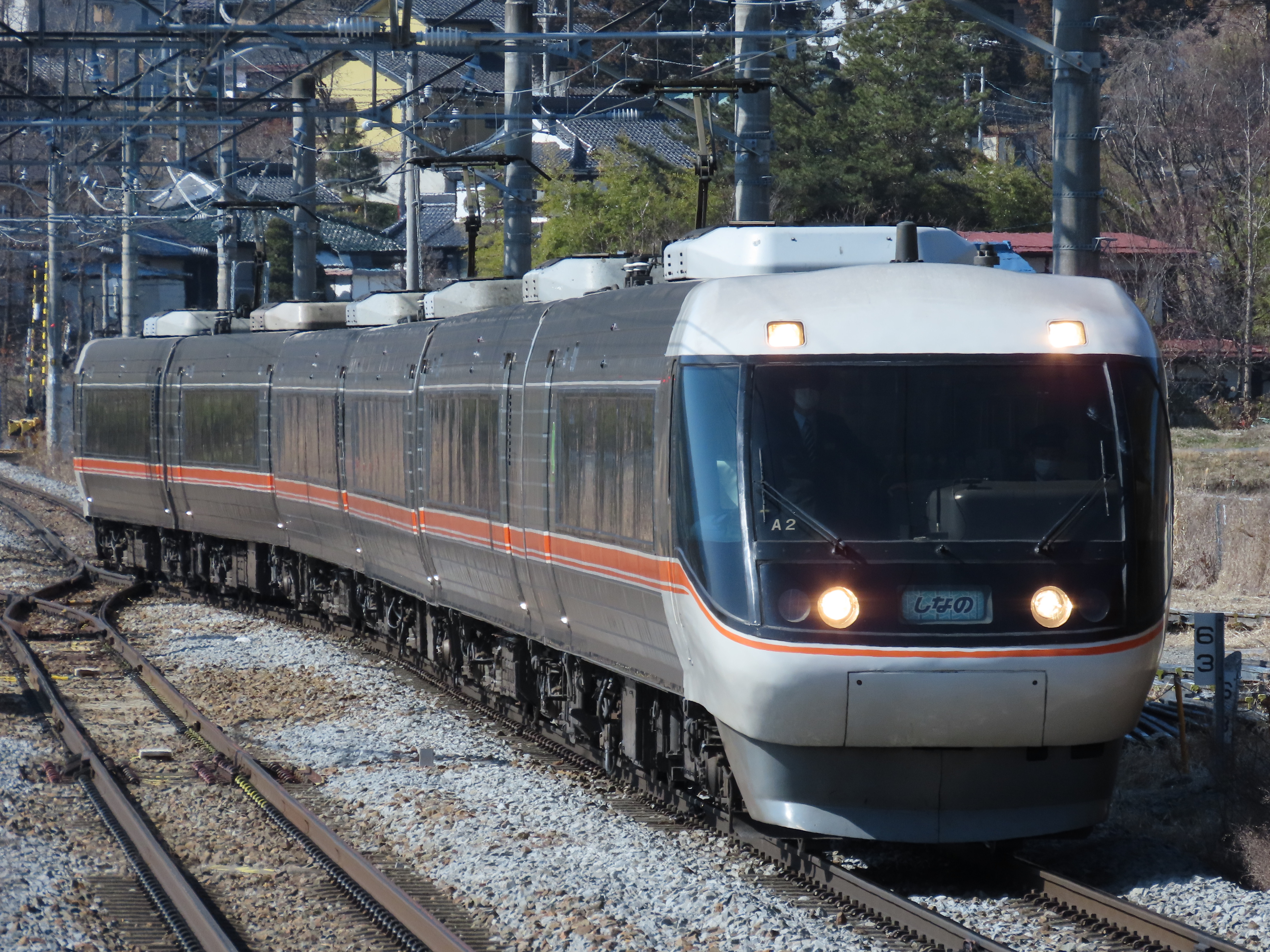
- 383 series electric train on a Shinano service in Spring 2024

Overview
- Service type: Limited express
- Status: Operational
- First service: 11 November 1953 (Semi-express); 13 December 1959 (Express); 1 October 1968 (Limited express)
- Last service: 26 March 2016 (Nagano - Ōsaka service)
- Current operator(s): JR Central / JR East
- Former operator(s): JNR

Route
- Termini: Nagoya; Nagano
- Stops: 15
- Distance travelled: 250.8 km (155.8 mi)
- Average journey time: 2 hours 55 minutes approx
- Service frequency: Approximately one train an hour in each direction
- Line(s) used: Chūō Main Line, Shinonoi Line, Shin'etsu Main Line

On-board services
- Class(es): Green + Standard
- Disabled access: Yes
- Seating arrangements: 2+2 unidirectional
- Sleeping arrangements: None
- Catering facilities: None
- Observation facilities: None
- Entertainment facilities: None
- Other facilities: Toilets

Technical
- Rolling stock: 383 series EMU
- Track gauge: 1,067 mm (3 ft 6 in)
- Electrification: 1,500 V DC
- Operating speed: 130 km/h (81 mph)
- Track owner(s): JR Central, JR East

The Shinano (しなの), branded as (Wide View) Shinano (（ワイドビュー）しなの) is a limited express train service in Japan operated by Central Japan Railway Company (JR Central), which runs between Nagoya and Nagano via Matsumoto. Like all JR Central limited express trains, a limited express fee has to be paid, on top of the normal fare to ride this service.

== Route ==
Trains start and terminate at Nagoya Station.

There was formerly a daily return service between Nagano and Ōsaka, which travelled a total distance of 274.1 miles (441.2 km) and took approximately 5 hours and 30 minutes. This made the Shinano the furthest travelling daytime limited express service in Japan prior to its discontinuation on 26 March 2016 due to declining passenger numbers. Some trains also ran seasonally to Hakuba, a service which has also stopped.

Trains stop at the following stations:

Nagoya - (Kanayama) - Chikusa - Tajimi - (Ena) - Nakatsugawa - (Nagiso) - (Agematsu) - Kiso-Fukushima - Shiojiri - Matsumoto - (Akashina) - (Hijiri-Kōgen) - Shinonoi - Nagano

Parentheses indicate stations where some but not all services stop.

== Rolling stock ==
- 383 series 6-, 8-, or 10-car EMUs (since 1 December 1996)

=== Past ===
- KiHa 181 series DMUs (1968–1972)
- 381 series EMUs (1972–2008)
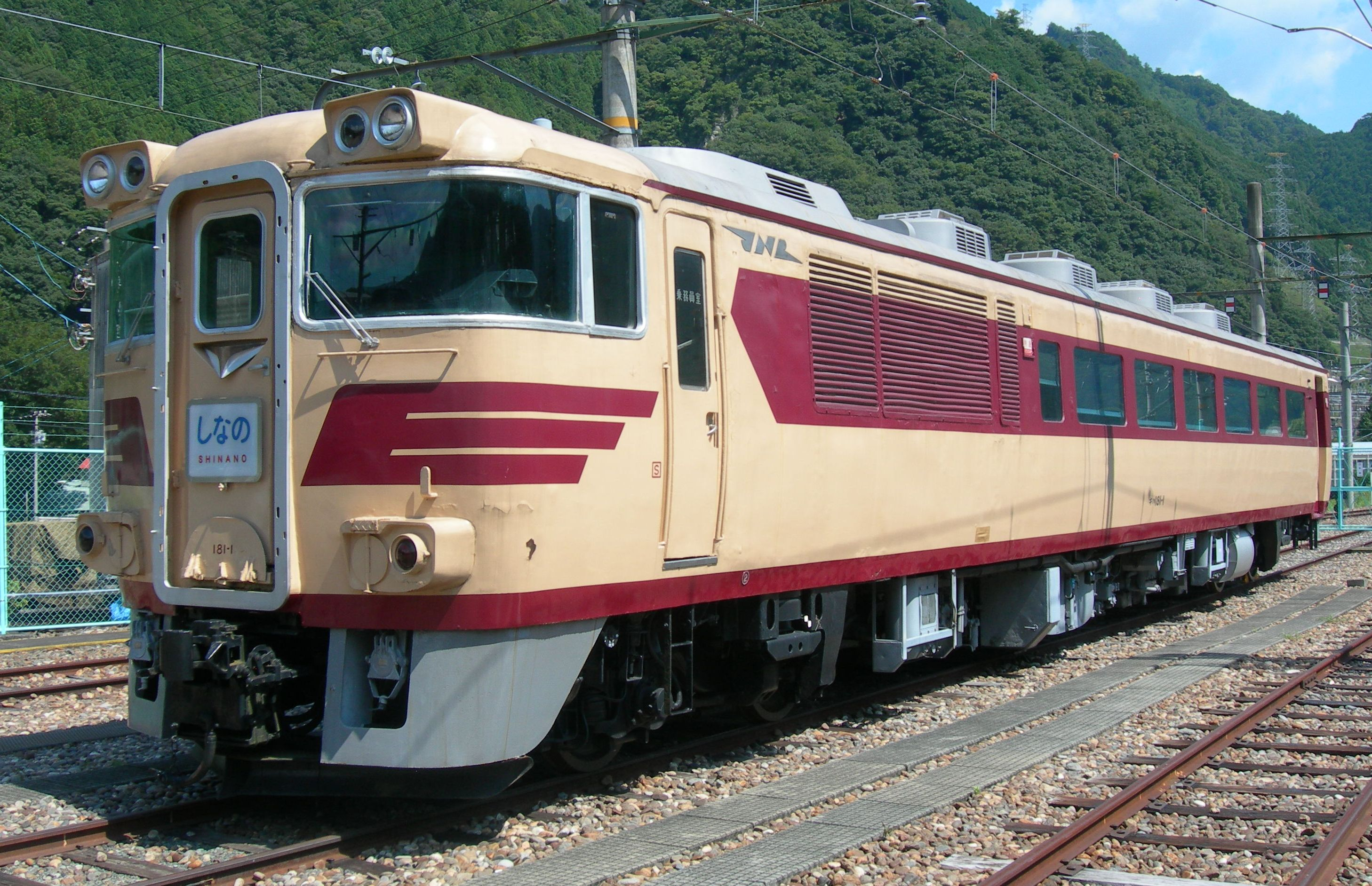
Preserved JNR KiHa 181 series DMU car

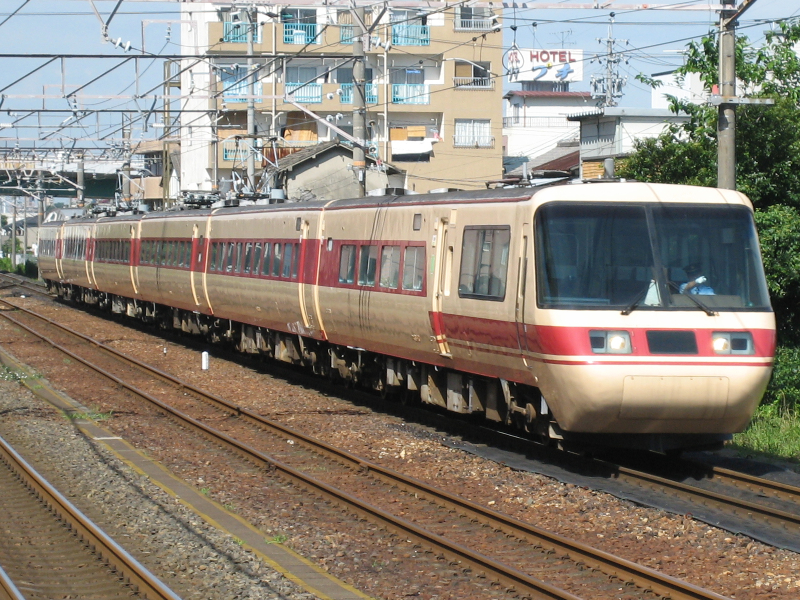
381 series EMU on a seasonal Shinano service, July 2006

== Accommodation ==
Green car (first class) and standard class accommodation is provided, with 2+2 abreast unidirectional seating in both classes. Seat pitch is 1,200 mm (47 in) in Green class and 1,000 mm (39 in) in standard class. All trains are non-smoking. Onboard catering services ceased on 16 March 2013.

== History ==
The Shinano service was first introduced on 11 November 1953 as a "semi-express" operating between Nagoya and Nagano. This was upgraded to "express" status from 13 December 1959, and became a "limited express" from 1 October 1968.
