= Kiso-Fukushima Station =

Railway station in Kiso, Nagano Prefecture, Japan

CF30 Kiso-Fukushima Station 木曽福島駅
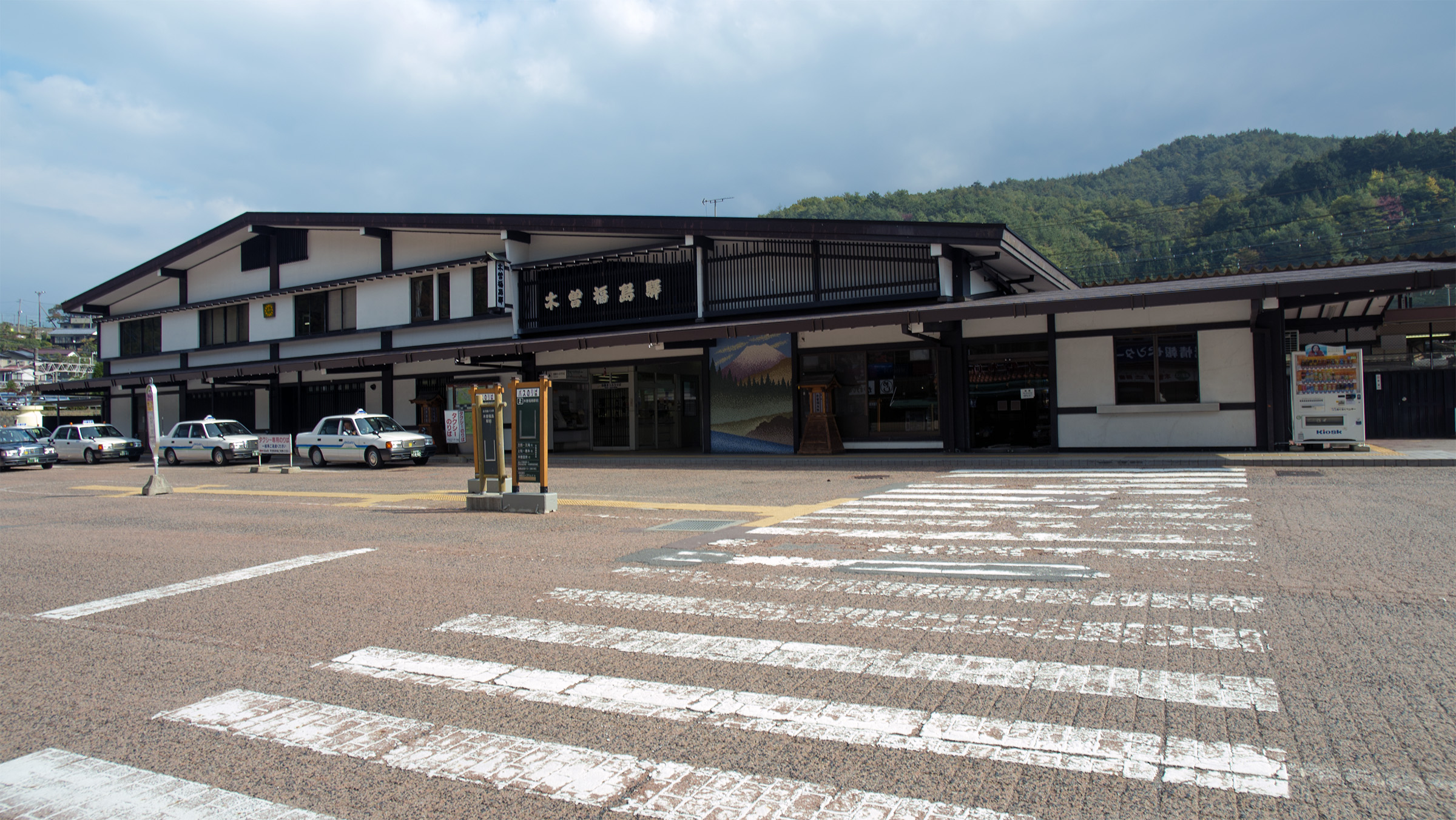
- Kiso Fukushima Station, November 2013

General information
- Location: Fukushima, Kiso-machi, Kiso-gun, Nagano-ken 397-0001; Japan
- Coordinates: 35.8439°N 137.6932°E
- Elevation: 775.3 meters
- Operator: JR Central
- Line: Chūō Main Line
- Distance: 263.8 km from Tokyo
- Platforms: 1 island platform
- Tracks: 2

Other information
- Status: Staffed
- Station code: CF30

History
- Opened: 5 October 1910; 115 years ago

Passengers
- FY2015: 774 daily
Location
- Location within Nagano Prefecture Location within Japan

Kiso-Fukushima Station (木曽福島駅, Kiso-Fukushima-eki) is a railway station in the town of Kiso, Nagano Prefecture, Japan, operated by Central Japan Railway Company (JR Tōkai).

== Lines ==
Kiso-Fukushima Station is served by the JR Tōkai Chūō Main Line, and is located 263.8 kilometers from the official starting point of the line at Tokyo and 133.1 kilometers from Nagoya.

== Layout ==
The station has one island platform connected to the station building by an underground passage. The station is staffed. An old JNR Class D51 locomotive is preserved at the station as a local attraction.

=== Platforms ===
1	■ Chūō Main Line	For Shiojiri and Nagano
2	■ Chūō Main Line	For Nakatsugawa and Nagoya

== Adjacent stations ==
←	Service	→
JR Central Chūō Main Line
Harano	Local	Agematsu
Shiojiri	Limited Express Shinano	Agematsu

== History ==
Kiso-Fukushima Station was opened on 25 November 1910. On 1 April 1987, it became part of JR Tōkai.

== Passenger statistics ==
In fiscal 2015, the station was used by an average of 774 passengers daily (boarding passengers only).

== Surrounding area ==
- Kiso Town Hall
- Kiso Fukushima Post Office
- Nagano Prefectural Kiso Seiho High School
- National Route 19

== See also ==
- List of railway stations in Japan
