= Nakatsugawa Station =

Railway station in Nakatsugawa, Gifu Prefecture, Japan

CF19 Nakatsugawa Station 中津川駅
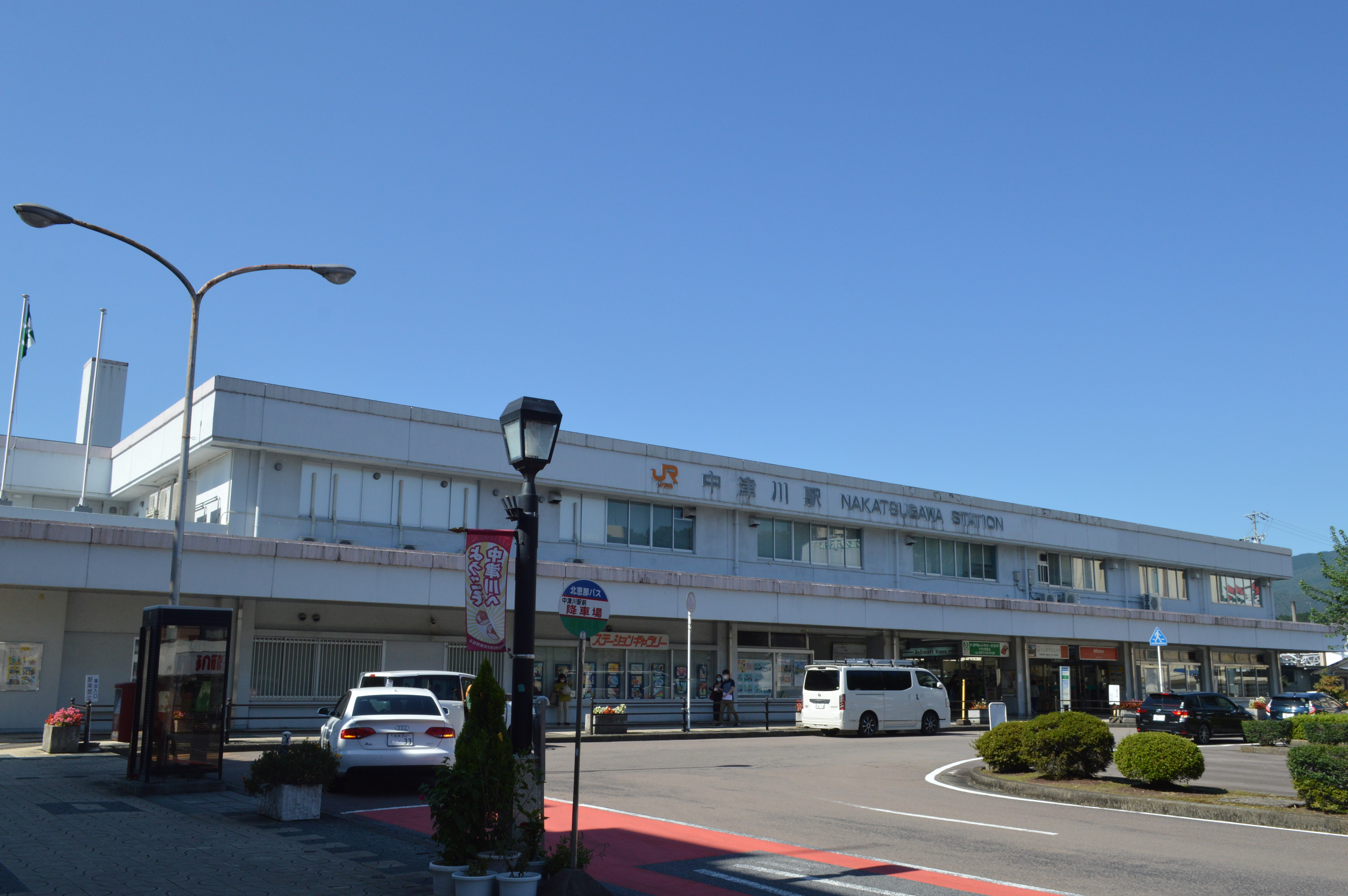
- Nakatsugawa Station, 2021

General information
- Location: 2-1-3 Ōtachō, Nakatsugawa-shi, Gifu-ken 508-0033; Japan
- Coordinates: 35.500507°N 137.503156°E
- Operator: JR Central
- Line: Chūō Main Line
- Distance: 317.0 km from Tokyo
- Platforms: 1 side + 1 island platform
- Tracks: 3

Other information
- Status: Staffed Midori no Madoguchi)
- Station code: CF19
- Website: Official website

History
- Opened: 21 December 1902; 123 years ago
- Former names: Nakatsu (to 1911)

Passengers
- FY2014: 3432 daily
Location
- Location within Gifu Prefecture Location within Japan

Nakatsugawa Station (中津川駅, Nakatsugawa-eki) is a railway station in the city of Nakatsugawa, Gifu Prefecture, Japan, operated by Central Japan Railway Company (JR Tōkai).

== Lines ==
Nakatsugawa Station is served by the JR Tōkai Chūō Main Line, and is located 317.0 kilometers from the official starting point of the line at Tokyo and 79.9 kilometers from Nagoya.

== Layout ==
The station has one ground-level side platform and one ground-level island platform connected by a footbridge. The station has a Midori no Madoguchi staffed ticket office.

=== Platforms ===
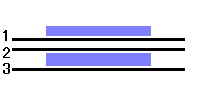
→:for Nagoya ←:for Matsumoto

1	■ Chūō Main Line	For Tajimi and Nagoya
2	■ Chūō Main Line	For Tajimi and Nagoya; For Kiso-Fukushima and Nagano
3	■ Chūō Main Line	For Kiso-Fukushima and Nagano

== Adjacent stations ==
«	Service	»
JR Central
Chūō Main Line
Nagiso	Limited Express Shinano	Ena
Terminus	Home Liner (Arrive only)	Ena
Terminus	Central Liner	Mino-Sakamoto
Ochiaigawa	Rapid	Mino-Sakamoto
Ochiaigawa	Local	Mino-Sakamoto

All passenger trains stop at this station, including the Shinano limited express.

== History ==
Nakatsugawa Station was opened on December 21, 1902 as Nakatsu Station (中津駅). It was renamed to its present name on 1 June 1911. On 1 April 1987, it became part of JR Tōkai.

== Passenger statistics ==
In fiscal 2014, the station was used by an average of 3432 passengers daily (boarding passengers only).

== Bus routes ==
- Kita-Ena Kotsu
  - For Kashimo General Office (At this bus stop, you are able to transfer onto Nohi Bus bound to Gero Station and Hida-Hagiwara Station)
  - For Mino-Sakamoto Station and Totetsu Ena Shako (At this bus stop, you are able to transfer onto Totetsu Bus bound to Ena Station)

== Surrounding area ==
- Nakatsugawa City Hall

== See also ==
- List of railway stations in Japan
