= Naoya =

- Gender: Male

Origin
- Origin: Japanese
- Meaning: Different meanings depending on the kanji used

Naoya (written: 直也, 直哉, 直弥, 直矢 or 尚弥) is a masculine Japanese given name. Notable people with the name include:

- Naoya Fuji (藤 直也; born 1993), Japanese footballer
- Naoya Fujiwara (藤原 直哉; born 1965), Japanese shogi player
- Naoya Gomoto (郷本 直也; born 1980), Japanese actor
- Naoya Hatakeyama (畠山 直哉; born 1958), Japanese photographer
- Higonoumi Naoya (肥後ノ海 直哉; born 1969), Japanese sumo wrestler
- Naoya Inose (猪瀬 直哉; born 1988), Japanese visual artist
- Naoya Inoue (井上 尚弥; born 1993), Japanese boxer
- Naoya Ishigami (石神 直哉; born 1985), Japanese footballer
- Naoya Kikuchi (菊地 直哉; born 1984), Japanese footballer
- Naoya Kondo (近藤 直也; born 1983), Japanese footballer
- Naoya Masuda (益田 直也; born 1989), Japanese baseball player
- Naoya Ogawa (小川 直也; born 1968), Japanese judoka, professional wrestler and mixed martial artist
- Naoya Okane (岡根 直哉; born 1988), Japanese footballer
- Naoya Saeki (佐伯 直哉; born 1977), Japanese footballer
- Naoya Sakamoto (阪本 直也; born 1988), Japanese sprint canoeist
- Naoya Shibamura (柴村 直弥; born 1982), Japanese footballer
- Naoya Shiga (志賀 直哉; 1883–1971), Japanese writer
- Shōdai Naoya (正代 直也; born 1991), Japanese sumo wrestler
- Naoya Tabara (田原 直哉; born 1980), Japanese artistic gymnast and freestyle skier
- Naoya Takahashi (髙橋 直也; born 2001), Japanese footballer
- Naoya Takei (武井 直也; 1893–1940), Japanese sculptor
- Naoya Tamura (田村 直也; born 1984), Japanese footballer
- Naoya Tamura (speed skater) (田村 直也; born 1979), Japanese speed skater
- Naoya Tomita (冨田 尚弥; born 1989), Japanese swimmer
- Naoya Tsukahara (塚原 直也; born 1977), Japanese artistic gymnast
- Naoya Uchida (内田 直哉; born 1953), Japanese voice actor, actor and singer
- Naoya Umeda (梅田 直哉; born 1978), Japanese footballer
- Naoya Urata (浦田 直也; born 1982), Japanese singer, actor and dancer
- Naoya Wada (和田 直也; born 1986), Japanese composer
- Naoya Yoshida (吉田 直矢; born 1994), Japanese footballer
- Naoya Sakamata (坂俣直哉; born 1986), Japanese composer

== Fictional characters ==
- Naoya Aizawa, a character from Interlude
- Naoya Kaido, a character from Kamen Rider 555
- Naoya Zen'in, a character from Jujutsu Kaisen
