= Seba Station =

Railway station in Shiojiri, Nagano Prefecture, Japan

Seba Station 洗馬駅
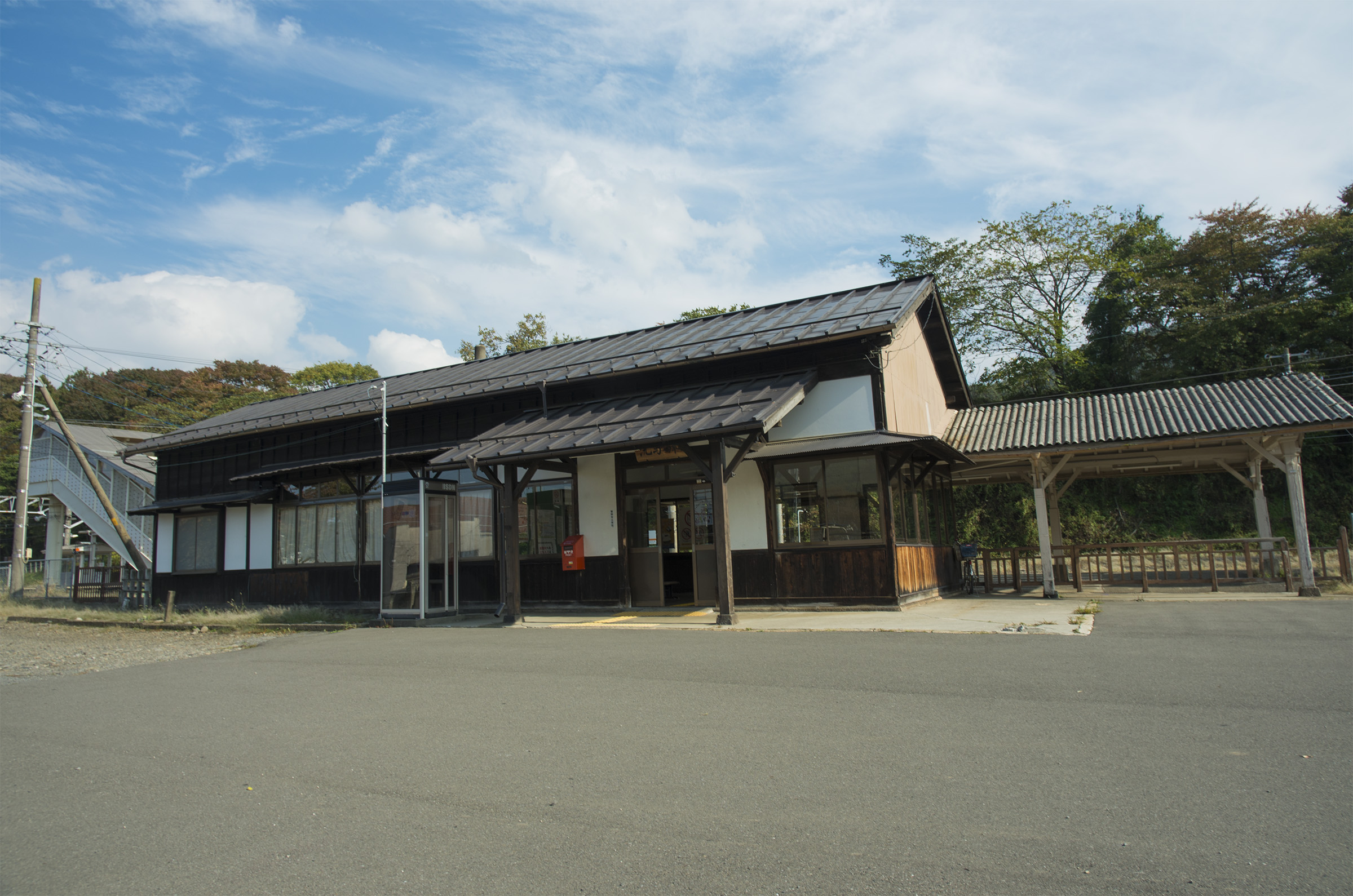
- Seba Station, November 2013

General information
- Location: Soga, Shiojiri-shi, Nagano-ken 399-6461; Japan
- Coordinates: 36.0872°N 137.9168°E
- Elevation: 762.5 meters
- Operator: JR Central
- Line: Chūō Main Line
- Distance: 226.3 km from Tokyo
- Platforms: 1 side + 1 island platform
- Tracks: 3

Other information
- Status: Unstaffed

History
- Opened: 1 December 1909; 116 years ago

Passengers
- FY2015: 56 daily
Location
- Location within Nagano Prefecture Location within Japan

Seba Station (洗馬駅, Seba-eki) is a railway station on the Chūō Main Line, Central Japan Railway Company in the city of Shiojiri, Nagano Prefecture, Japan.

== Lines ==
Seba Station is served by the JR Tōkai Chūō Main Line, and is located 226.3 kilometers from the official starting point of the line at Tokyo and 170.6 kilometers from Nagoya.

== Layout ==
The station has one ground-level side platform and one island platform connected by a footbridge. The station is unattended.

=== Platforms ===
1	■ Chūō Main Line	For Shiojiri and Nagano
2	■ Chūō Main Line	(siding)
3	■ Chūō Main Line	For Nakatsugawa and Nagoya

== Adjacent stations ==
←	Service	→
Shiojiri	Local	Hideshio

== History ==
Seba Station was opened on 1 December 1909. On 1 April 1987, it became part of JR Tōkai.

== Passenger statistics ==
In fiscal 2015, the station was used by an average of 56 passengers daily (boarding passengers only).

== Surrounding area ==
- Hiraide ruins (National Historic Site)
- Seba-juku
- National Route 19

== See also ==
- List of railway stations in Japan
