= Shiojiri =

Shiojiri may refer to

== Places ==
- Shiojiri, Nagano, a city in Japan
- Shiojiri Station, a railway station in Shiojiri, Nagano
- Shiojiri-shuku, a former station in Shiojiri, Nagano

== People ==
- Kazuya Shiojiri (塩尻 和也; born 1996), Japanese runner
