= Takei =

Takei (written: 武井 or 竹井) is a Japanese surname. Notable people with the surname include:

- Emi Takei (born 1993), Japanese actress, fashion model, and singer
- Esther Takei Nishio (1925–2019), selected as a "test case" as the first World War II internee of Japanese descent to return from camp and enroll in a California university
- George Takei (born 1937), American actor
- Hideyuki Takei (竹井 秀行; born 1970), Japanese pole vaulter
- Hiroyuki Takei (born 1972), Japanese manga writer
- Kei Takei (武井 慧; born 1946), Japanese dancer
- Keiji Takei (born 1980), Japanese former rugby player
- Koji Takei (born 1990), Japanese water polo player
- Morishige Takei (武井 守成; 1890–1949), Japanese classical mandolinist
- Naoya Takei (武井 直也; 1893–1940), Japanese sculptor
- Sō Takei (born 1973), Japanese tarento and former track and field athlete
- Takuya Takei (born 1986), Japanese football player
- Tokiji Takei (1903–1991), Japanese poet
- Yasuo Takei (1930–2006), the founder and former chairman of Takefuji
- Yuta Takei (born 2000), Japanese badminton player

== Fictional characters ==
- Junko Takei, a character in the media franchise Strike Witches

== See also ==
- 7307 Takei, a main-belt asteroid
