= Hirasawa =

Hirasawa (written: 平澤 or 平沢) is a Japanese surname. Notable people with the surname include:

- Gaku Hirasawa (平澤 岳; born 1973), Japanese alpine skier
- Katsuei Hirasawa (平沢 勝栄; born 1945), Japanese politician
- Maia Hirasawa (born 1980), Swedish singer-songwriter
- Nako Hirasawa, Japanese Paralympic archer
- Masanori Hirasawa (平沢 正規), Japanese astronomer
- Mitsuhide Hirasawa (平澤 光秀; born 1982), Japanese professional wrestler
- Rinako Hirasawa (平沢 里菜子; born 1983), Japanese pornographic actress
- Sadamichi Hirasawa (平沢 貞通; 1892–1987), Japanese tempera painter
- Shusaku Hirasawa (平沢 周策; born 1949), Japanese footballer
- Susumu Hirasawa (平沢 進; born 1954), Japanese progressive-electronic musician and composer

== Fictional characters ==
- Kazuomi Hirasawa (平澤 一臣), character in the anime series Higashi no Eden
- Ui Hirasawa (平沢 憂), character in the manga series K-On!
- Yui Hirasawa (平沢 唯), character in the manga series K-On!

== Places ==
- Kiso-Hirasawa station, station in Shiojiri, Japan

== See also ==
- Pyeongtaek, South Korea, written as 平澤 in Hanja
