= Hideshio Station =

Railway station in Shiojiri, Nagano Prefecture, Japan

Hideshio Station 日出塩駅
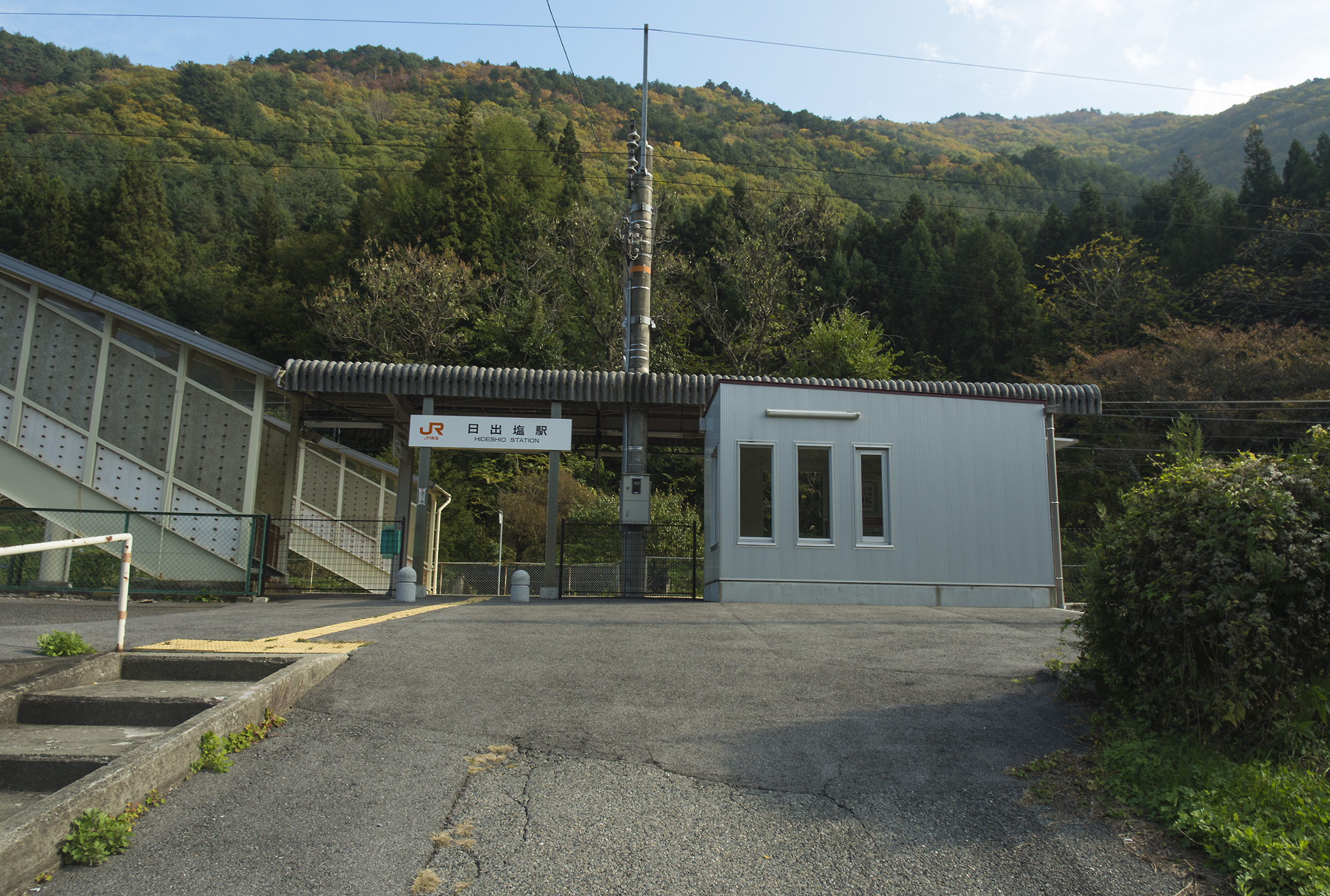
- Hideshio Station in November 2013

General information
- Location: Soga, Shiojiri-shi, Nagano-ken 399-6461; Japan
- Coordinates: 36.0490°N 137.8951°E
- Elevation: 811.6 meters
- Operator: JR Central
- Line: Chūō Main Line
- Distance: 231.0 km from Tokyo
- Platforms: 2 side platforms
- Tracks: 2

Other information
- Status: Unstaffed

History
- Opened: 21 December 1926; 99 years ago

Passengers
- FY2015: 12 daily
Location
- Location within Nagano Prefecture Location within Japan

Hideshio Station (日出塩駅, Hideshio-eki) is a railway station on the Chūō Main Line, Central Japan Railway Company in the city of Shiojiri, Nagano Prefecture, Japan.

== Lines ==
Hideshio Station is served by the JR Tōkai Chūō Main Line, and is located 231.0 kilometers from the official starting point of the line at Tokyo and 165.9 kilometers from Nagoya.

== Layout ==
The station has two ground-level side platforms connected by a footbridge. The station is unattended.

=== Platforms ===
1	■ Chūō Main Line	For Shiojiri and Nagano
2	■ Chūō Main Line	For Nakatsugawa and Nagoya

== Adjacent stations ==
←	Service	→
JR Central Chūō Main Line
Seba	Local	Niekawa

== History ==
Hideshio Station began as Hideshio Signal Stop on 10 September 1913. it was elevated to a full passenger station on 21 December 1926. On 1 April 1987, it became part of JR Tōkai. A new station building was completed in 2009.

== Passenger statistics ==
In fiscal 2015, the station was used by an average of 12 passengers daily (boarding passengers only).

== Surrounding area ==
- Motoyama-juku
- National Route 19

== See also ==
- List of railway stations in Japan
