= Inose =

Inose (written: 猪瀬) is a Japanese surname. Notable people with the surname include:

- Hiroshi Inose (猪瀬 博, 1927–2000), Japanese electrical engineer
- Kosuke Inose (猪瀬 康介, born 2000), Japanese footballer
- Naoki Inose (猪瀬 直樹, born 1946), Japanese journalist, historian, social critic and biographer
- Naoya Inose (猪瀬 直哉, born 1988), Japanese visual artist
