= Narai Station =

Railway station in Shiojiri, Nagano Prefecture, Japan

Narai Station 奈良井駅
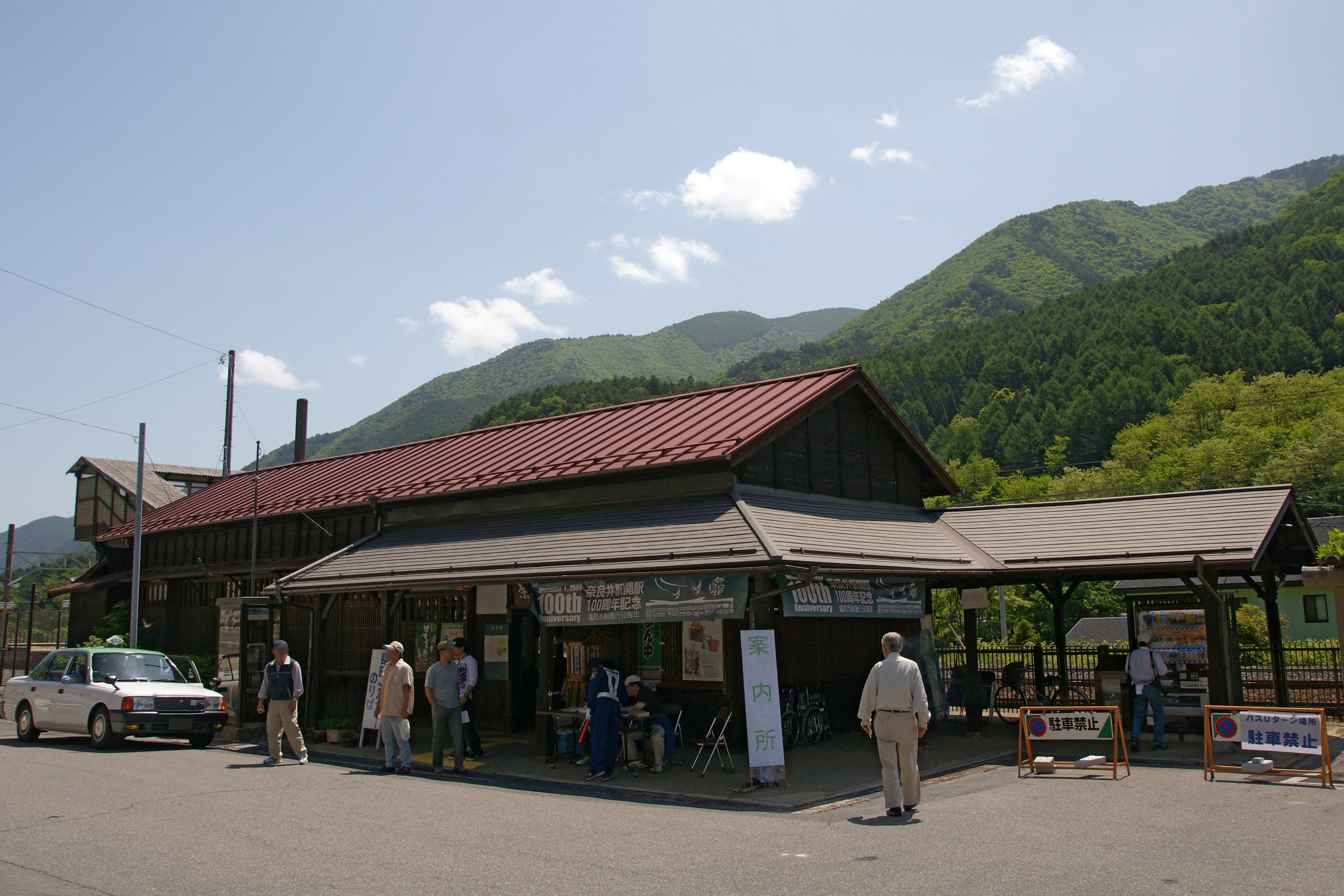
- Narai Station in June 2009

General information
- Location: Narai, Shiojiri-shi, Nagano-ken 399-6303; Japan
- Coordinates: 35.9692°N 137.8160°E
- Elevation: 933.8 meters
- Operator: JR Central
- Line: Chūō Main Line
- Distance: 243.2 km from Tokyo
- Platforms: 1 side + 1 island platform
- Tracks: 3

Other information
- Status: Staffed

History
- Opened: 1 December 1909; 116 years ago

Passengers
- FY2015: 63 daily
Location
- Location within Nagano Prefecture Location within Japan

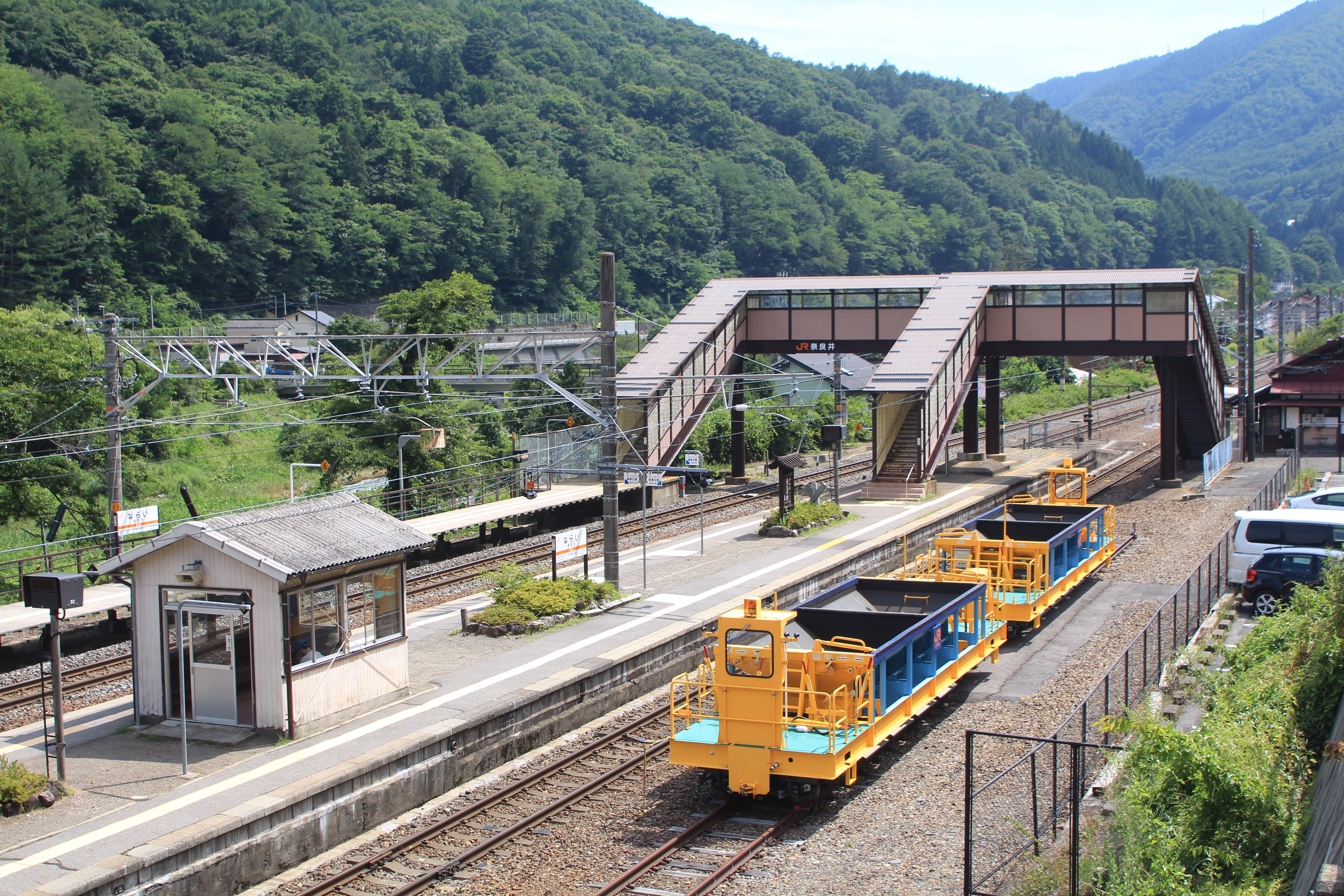
platforms and footbridge of Narai Station

Narai Station (奈良井駅, Narai-eki) is a railway station of Chūō Main Line, Central Japan Railway Company in the city of Shiojiri, Nagano Prefecture, Japan.

== Lines ==
Narai Station is served by the JR Tōkai Chūō Main Line, and is located 243.2 kilometers from the official starting point of the line at Tokyo and 153.7 kilometers from Nagoya.

== Layout ==
The station has one side platform and one island platform connected by a footbridge to the station building, which dates from the opening of the station. The station is staffed.

=== Platforms ===
1	■ Chūō Main Line	For Shiojiri and Nagano
2	■ Chūō Main Line	siding
3	■ Chūō Main Line	For Nakatsugawa and Nagoya

== Adjacent stations ==
←	Service	→
JR Central Chūō Main Line
Kiso-Hirasawa	Local	Yabuhara

== History ==
Narai Station was opened on 1 December 1909. On 1 April 1987, it became part of JR Tōkai.

== Passenger statistics ==
In fiscal 2015, the station was used by an average of 63 passengers daily (boarding passengers only).

== Surrounding area ==
- Narai-juku
- National Route 19

== See also ==
- List of railway stations in Japan
