= Niekawa Station =

Railway station in Shiojiri, Nagano Prefecture, Japan

Niekawa Station 贄川駅
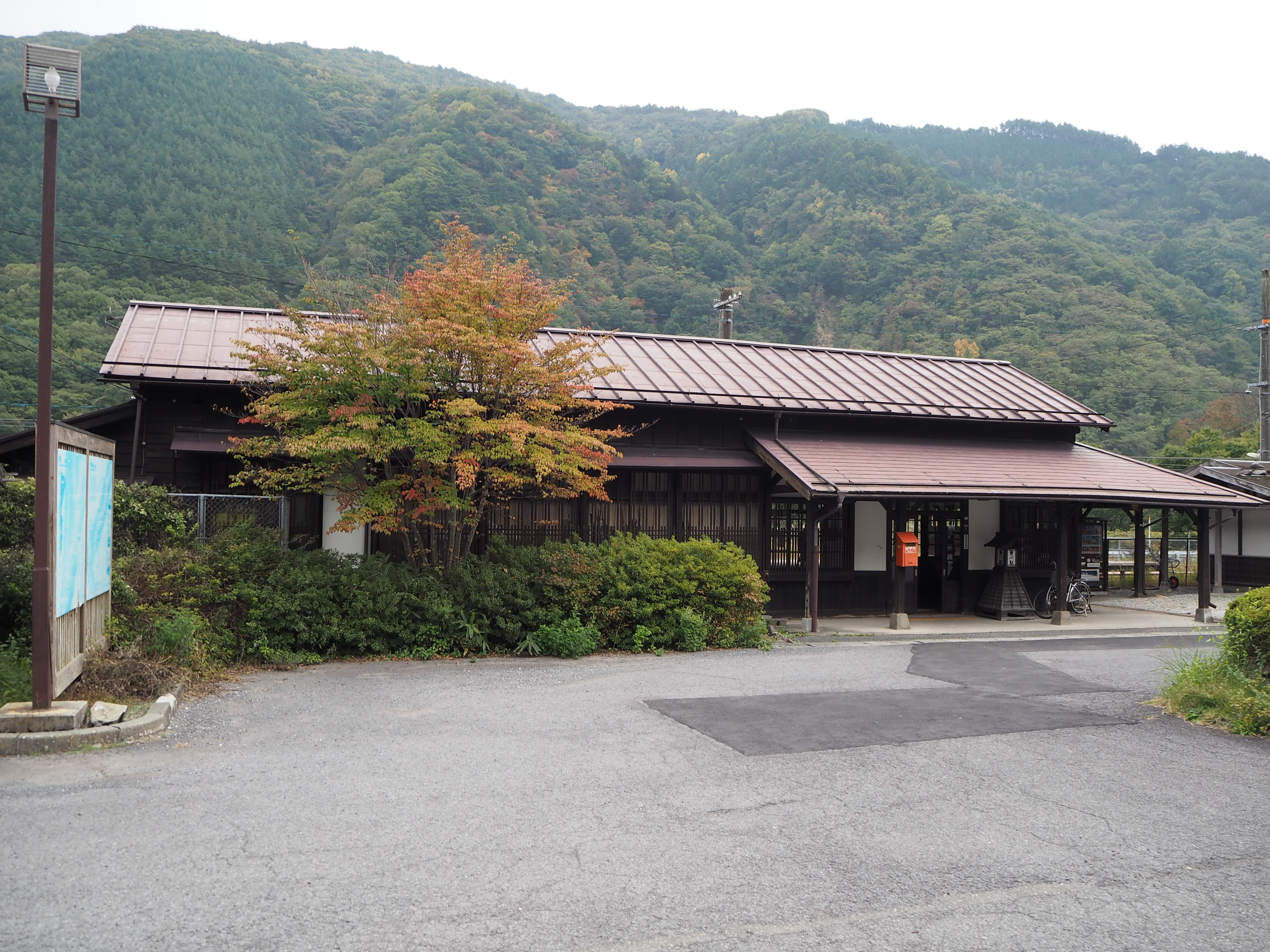
- Niekawa Station in October 2015

General information
- Location: Niekawa, Shiojiri-shi, Nagano-ken 399-6301; Japan
- Coordinates: 36.0138°N 137.8609°E
- Elevation: 871.6 meters
- Operator: JR Central
- Line: Chūō Main Line
- Distance: 236.2 km from Tokyo
- Platforms: 1 side + 1 island platform
- Tracks: 2

Other information
- Status: Unstaffed

History
- Opened: 1 December 1909; 116 years ago

Passengers
- FY2015: 108 daily
Location
- Location within Nagano Prefecture Location within Japan

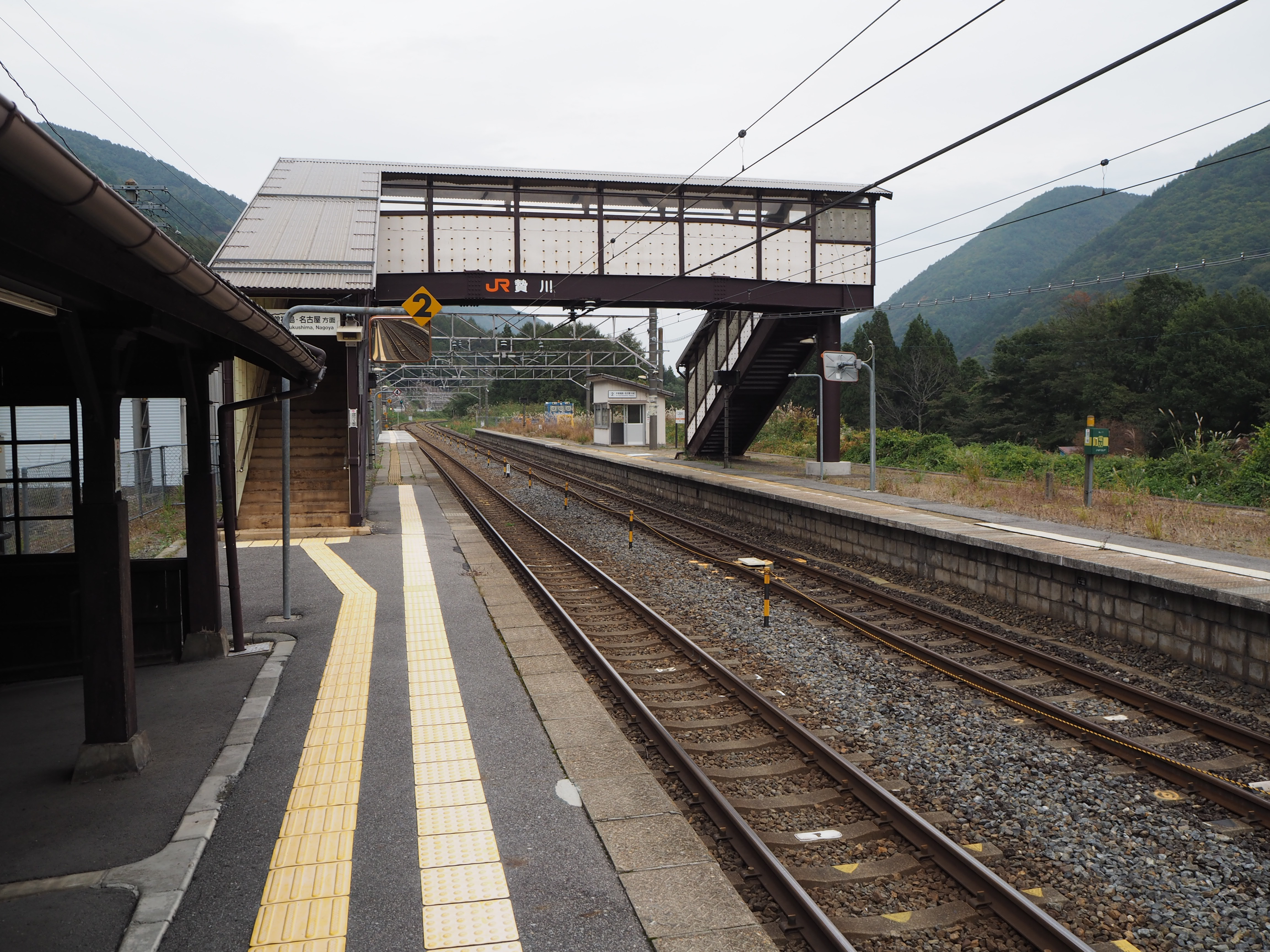
Niekawa Station platforms

Niekawa Station (贄川駅, Niekawa-eki) is a railway station of the Chūō Main Line, Central Japan Railway Company in the city of Shiojiri, Nagano Prefecture, Japan.

== Lines ==
Niekawa Station is served by the JR Tōkai Chūō Main Line, and is located 236.2 kilometers from the official starting point of the line at Tokyo and 160.7 kilometers from Nagoya.

== Layout ==
The station has one ground-level side platform and one island platform connected by a footbridge to the station building, which dates from the opening of the station. However, only one side of the island platform is in use. The station is unattended.

=== Platforms ===
1	■ Chūō Main Line	For Shiojiri and Nagano
2	■ Chūō Main Line	For Nakatsugawa and Nagoya

== Adjacent stations ==
←	Service	→
JR Central Chūō Main Line
Hideshio	Local	Kiso-Hirasawa

== History ==
Niekawa Station was opened on 1 December 1909. On 1 April 1987, it became part of JR Tōkai.

== Passenger statistics ==
In fiscal 2015, the station was used by an average of 108 passengers daily (boarding passengers only).

== Surrounding area ==
- Niekawa-juku
- National Route 19

== See also ==
- List of railway stations in Japan
