= Motoyama-juku =

Coordinates: 36°3′40.2″N 137°54′4.9″E

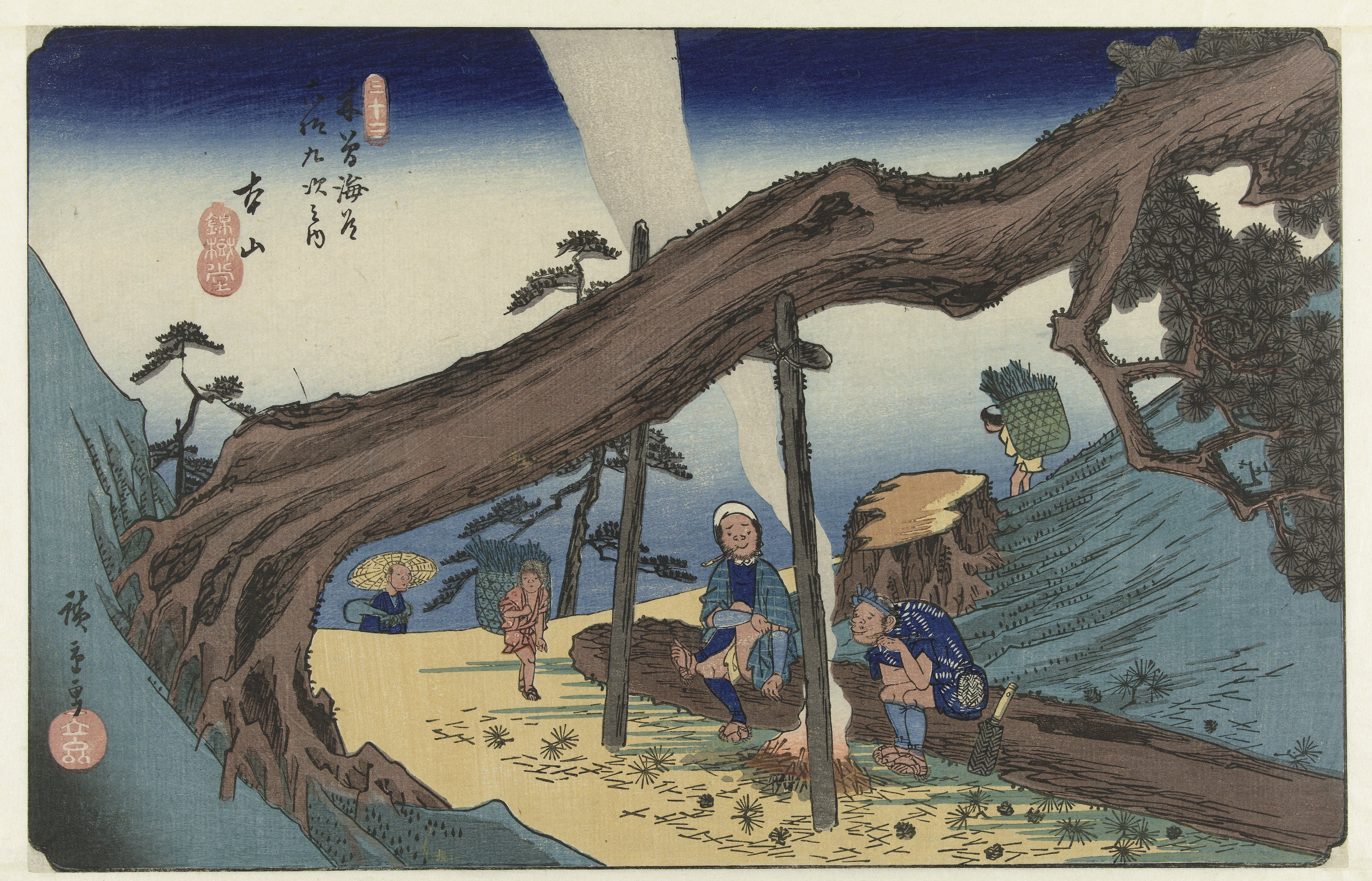
Hiroshige's print of Motoyama-juku, part of the series The Sixty-nine Stations of the Kiso Kaidō

Motoyama-juku (本山宿, Motoyama-juku) was the thirty-second of the sixty-nine stations of the Nakasendō. It is located in the central part of the present-day city of Shiojiri, Nagano Prefecture, Japan.

== History ==
Motoyama became a post town in 1614, when the Nakasendō's route was changed. It became a post town at the same time as Shiojiri-juku and Seba-juku. It became known throughout the country for its soba noodles.

== Neighboring post towns ==
Nakasendō
Seba-juku - Motoyama-juku - Niekawa-juku
