= Matsumoto Dental University =

Private university in Shiojiri, Nagano, Japan

Coordinates: 36°7′39.6″N 137°56′25.1″E

- 松本歯科大学
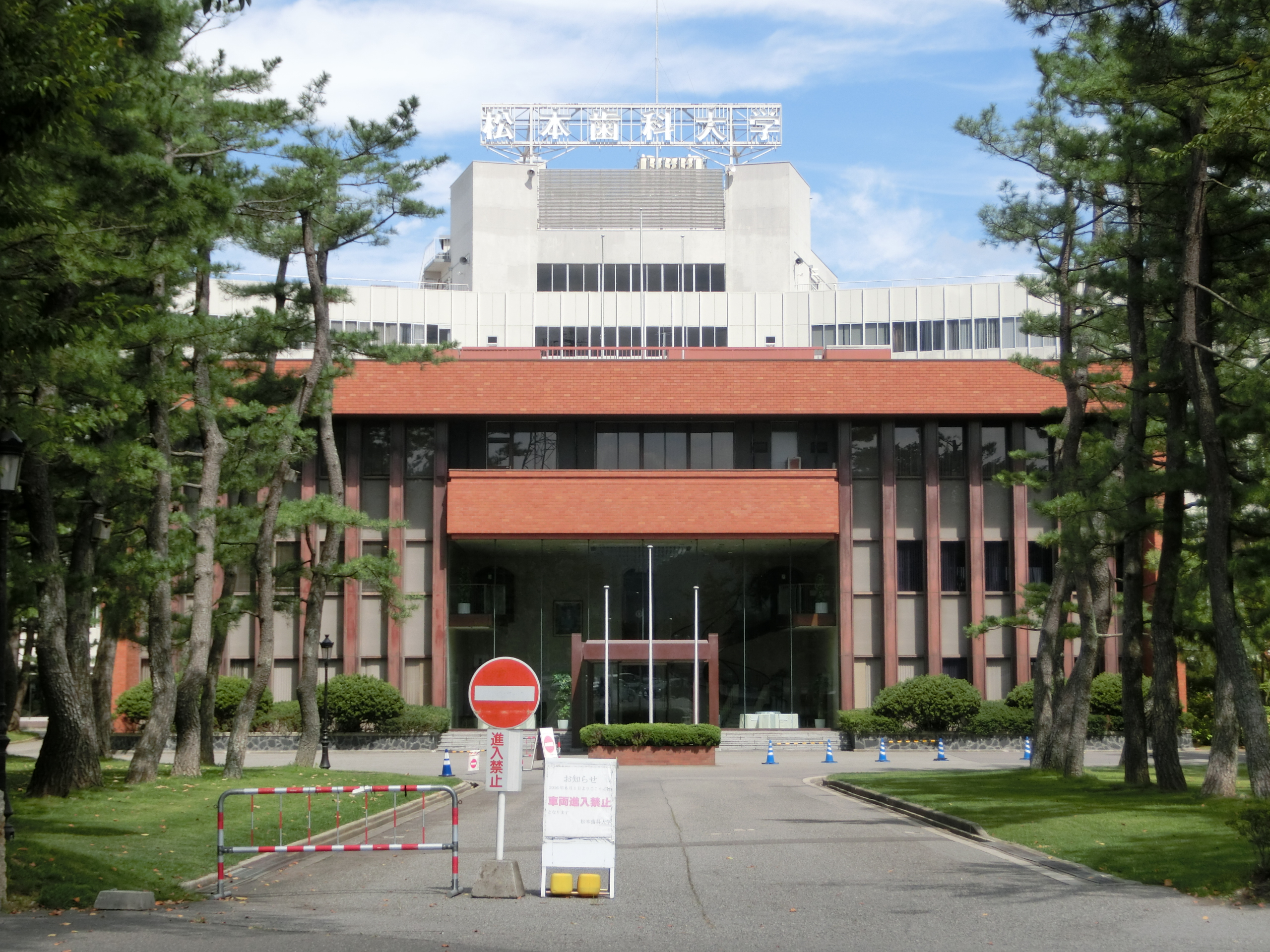
- Matsumoto Dental University
- Type: Private
- Established: 1972
- Location: Shiojiri, Nagano, Japan
- Website: Official website

Matsumoto Dental University (松本歯科大学, Matsumoto shika daigaku) is a private university in Shiojiri, Nagano, Japan, established in 1972. It has a 6-year dental program, a 3-year dental hygiene program, and a graduate school of dentistry.
