= Enrei Onodachi Memorial Festival =

Festival in Japan

Enrei Onodachi Memorial Festival Enrei Onodachi Kinensai (塩嶺御野立記念祭)
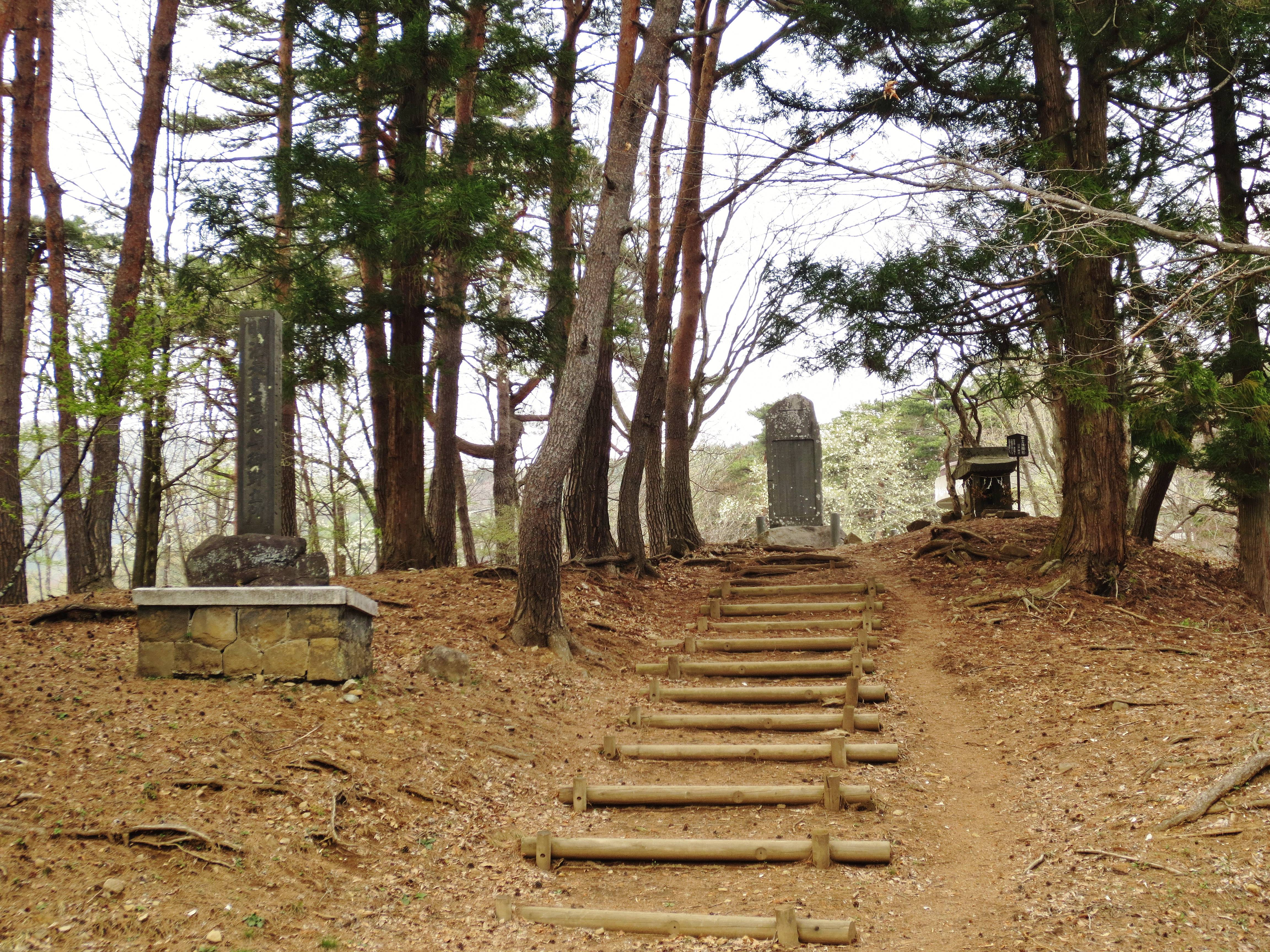
- The park where the festival is held
- Status: Active
- Genre: Japanese festival
- Dates: June and October
- Frequency: Bi-annually
- Venue: Enrei Onodachi Park
- Locations: Shiojiri Pass, Okaya–Shiojiri border, Nagano Prefecture
- Coordinates: 36.0920°N 138.0277°E
- Country: Japan
- Years active: 110 (Spring); 78 (Autumn)
- Inaugurated: June 24, 1916 (Spring); October 14, 1947 (Autumn)
- Participants: 120 (usual)
- Area: Okaya and Shiojiri, Nagano
- Major events: Bowing
- Organiser: Okaya Municipal Government (Spring); Shiojiri Municipal Government (Autumn)

The Enrei Onodachi Memorial Festival (Japanese: 塩嶺御野立記念祭, Hepburn: Enrei Onodachi Kinensai) is a biannual festival held every June and October in Enrei Onodachi Park in Shiojiri Pass located at the border of Okaya and Shiojiri in Nagano Prefecture.

The spring festival commemorates the visit of Emperor Meiji to the area on June 24, 1880. It is hosted by the Okaya Municipal Government. The autumn festival commemorates the visit of Emperor Hirohito to the area on October 14, 1947. It is hosted by the Shiojiri Municipal Government.

In 1915, to commemorate the visit of Emperor Meiji in 1880, the villages of Hirano, Nagaji, Shiojiri, and Chikumachi (the former two are now part of Okaya and the latter two of Shiojiri) erected a stone monument. The following year, the festival began. Following the visit of Emperor Hirohito in 1947, the autumn festival started. According to Shinmin Shimbun, the festival was held to "reminisce about the past and praying for the development of both cities".

It is known as the shortest festival in Japan. The festival starts around 10:00 am, and the people who participate in the festival all bow their heads at once after a person in charge signals "Everyone, bow" (一同、礼, Ichidō, Rei). It usually lasts only for a short time, and the festival then ends. Prior to 2006, the festival only lasted ten seconds. In the spring festival of 2006, it was extended to one minute after the Okaya City government said that ten seconds was "too short to show respect". In the autumn festival in the same year, it was shortened to 30 seconds after the Shiojiri City government said that "one minute was too long". By the Autumn festival in 2007, both cities agreed to settle on 20 seconds. Starting October 2023, the autumn festival was shortened to 15 seconds because "it would be better to shorten it to express the heartfelt feelings". There was once an unsuccessful application for the Guinness Book of World Records record for the "world shortest festival" made in the festival's name.

It is usually attended by government officials from both Shiojiri and Okaya, including the mayor and city councilors. Some members of various business and tourism organizations from both cities also attend. Around 120 people normally attend the two festivals.
