= Nashikubo ruins =

- 梨久保遺跡 (Japanese)
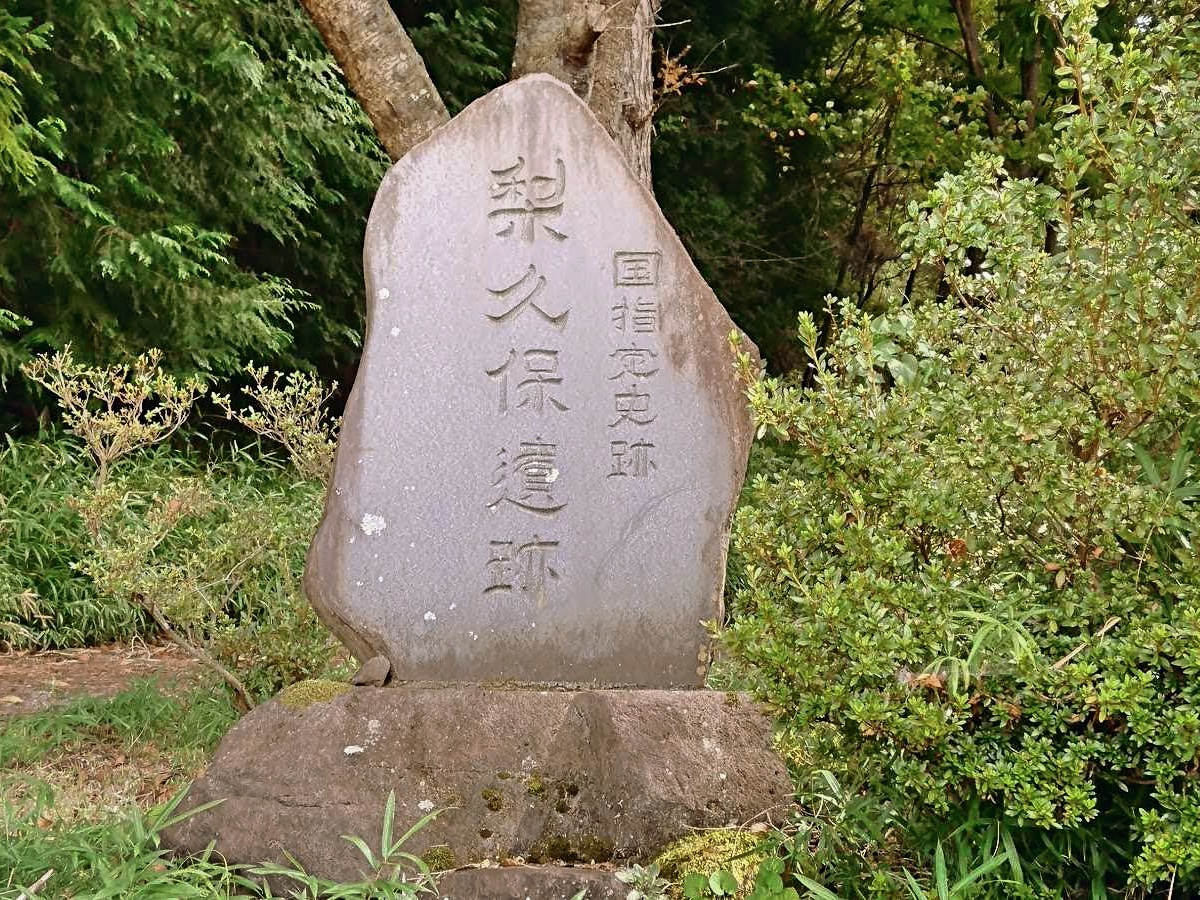
- Nashikubo ruins

- Nashikubo ruins Nashikubo ruins (Japan)
- 36°05′18″N 138°03′34″E
- Type: settlement
- Periods: Jōmon period
- Location: Okaya, Nagano, Japan
- Region: Chūbu region

Site notes
- Elevation: 830 m (2,720 ft)
- Public access: Yes (no facilities)

The Nashikubo ruins (梨久保遺跡, Nashikubo iseki) is an archaeological site containing the ruins of a Jōmon period settlement located in the Osachinashikubo neighborhood of the city of Okaya, Nagano in the Chūbu region of Japan. The site was designated a National Historic Site of Japan in 1984.

== Overview ==
The Nashikubo site is located on the northern side of the Suwa basin in central Nagano Prefecture at an elevation of 830 to 860 meters. The location is northwest of Lake Suwa and is on an alluvial fan formed by the Jogenjisawa River flowing from the mountains north of Lake Suwa. It was first reported to academia in 1901 and was excavated seven times: in 1918, and from 1949 to 1950 and 1963 and 1969. The site measures approximately 150 meters east-west by 250 meters north-south, with three groups of residences along the contour line of the slope. The foundations of seven pit dwellings from the early Jōmon period (4000–2500 BCE), 58 from the middle Jōmon period (3000–2000 BCE), eight, including four with flagstone floors, from the late Jōmon period (2000–1000 BCE), and 21 from an undetermined period were discovered. The site also included a number of tombs located between the dwellings. The number of tombs found was 485. There is a high probability that the site extends considerably further than what has been excavated to date.

Numerous examples of a distinctive style of Jōmon pottery, decorated with a woven bamboo geometric motif to resemble a basket were found, and this pottery has been named the "Nashikubo style". It dates from the early middle Jōmon period. Grave goods include jade and amber jewelry which originated from the coast of the Sea of Japan in what is now Niigata Prefecture, indicating long-distance trading during the Jōmon period.

The site was backfilled after excavation and is now an empty field. It is located approximately 15 minutes on foot from Okaya Station on the JR Tokai Chūō Main Line railway.

== See also ==
- List of Historic Sites of Japan (Nagano)
