= Shiojiri-shuku =

Coordinates: 36°06′13.3″N 137°58′30.0″E

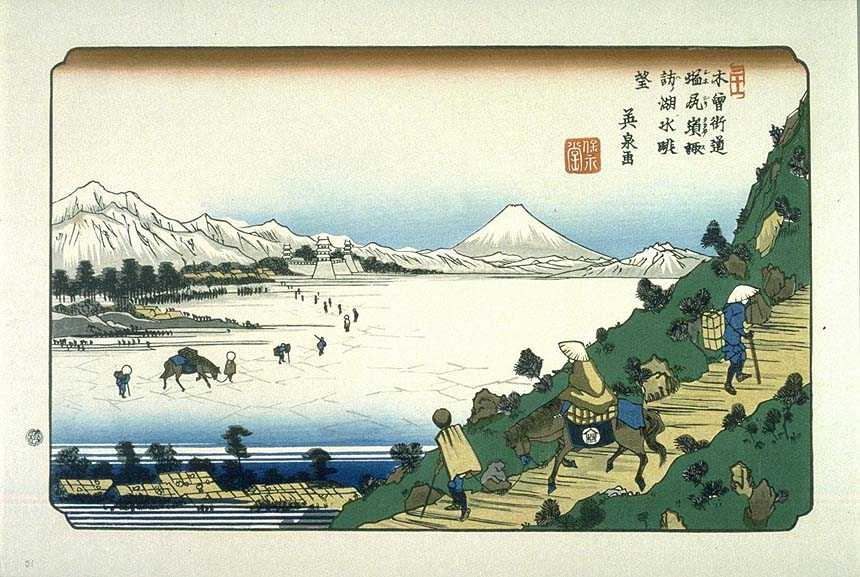
Keisai Eisen's print of Shiojiri-shuku, part of the series The Sixty-nine Stations of the Kiso Kaidō

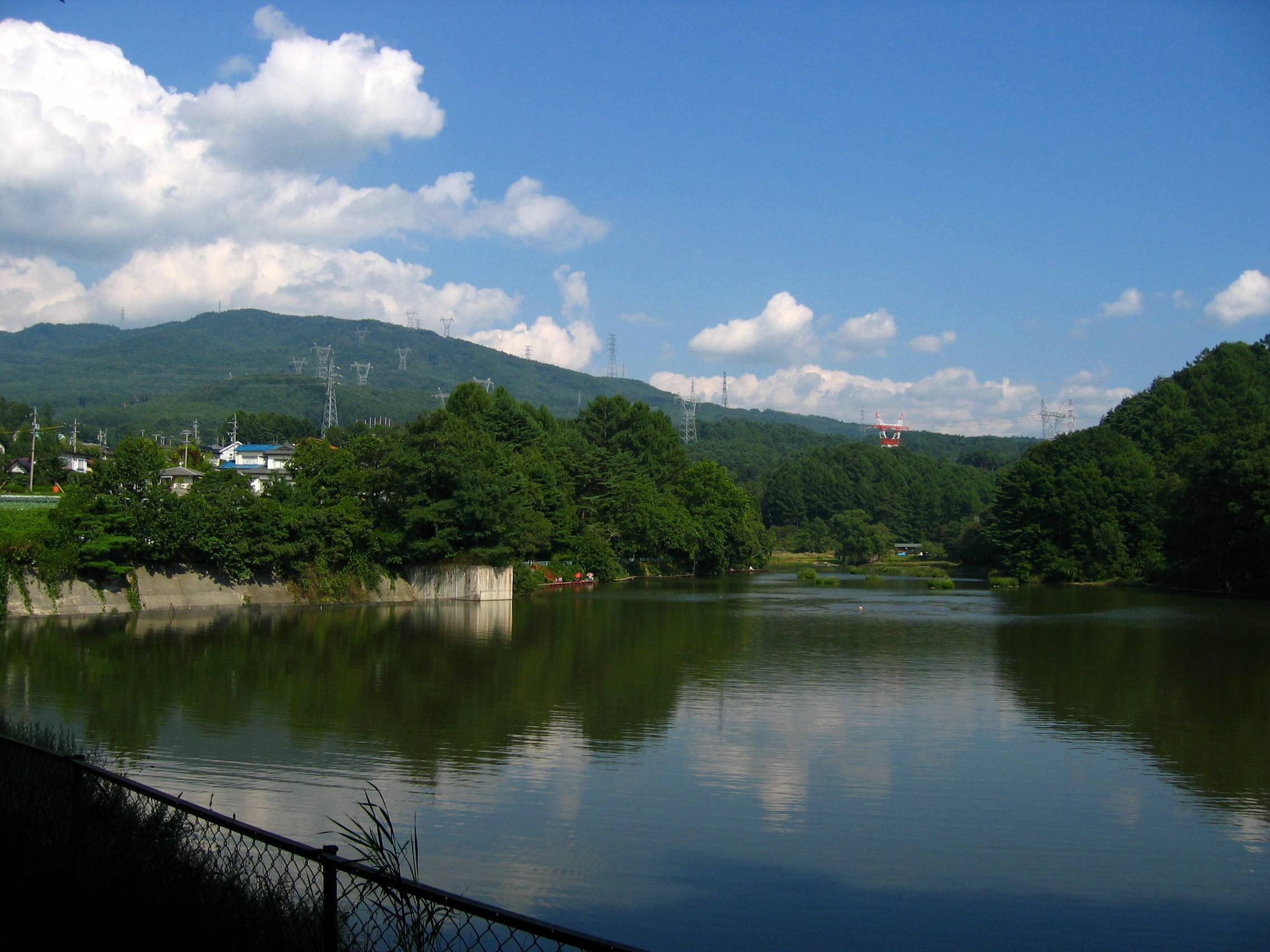
Lake Midoriko near Shiojiri Pass, east of Shiojiri-shuku

Shiojiri-shuku (塩尻宿, Shiojiri-shuku) was the thirtieth of the sixty-nine stations of the Nakasendō. It is located in the central part of the present-day city of Shiojiri, Nagano Prefecture, Japan.

== History ==
This area was originally built by Ōkubo Nagayasu in the Keichō era of the early Edo period. There was a shorter route along the Nakasendō that connected Shimosuwa-shuku and Niekawa-juku directly, but the route was changed to include this post town, as well as Seba-juku and Motoyama-juku, after Ōkubo's death. It eventually became the connecting post town between Shimosuwa-shuku and Seba-juku. During its most prosperous period, there were over 70 buildings in the town and it thrived as one of the kokudaka of the Matsumoto Domain. Because of its size, it was divided into "upper," "central" and "lower" portions. During the Meiji period, there was a large fire, which destroyed most of the town.

The post station also served as one terminus for the Sanshū Kaidō, a trade route which brought salt to Japan's interior. Records show that in 1843, Shiojiri-juku had 794 residents and 166 buildings. Among the building, there was one honjin, one sub-honjin, and 75 hatago.

Modern view of the Nakasendo as it goes through Shiojiri-juku.

== Neighboring post towns ==
Nakasendō
Shimosuwa-shuku - Shiojiri-shuku - Seba-juku
Shio no Michi's Sanshū Kaidō
Shiojiri-shuku (starting location) - Ono-juku
