= Naoya Wada =

Japanese composer and arranger (born 1986)

- Born: 1986 (age 39–40); Japan Kitakyushu, Fukuoka
- Occupation: composer
- Website: official website

Naoya Wada (和田 直也, Wada Naoya) is a Japanese composer and arranger.

== Biography ==
Born on June 6, 1986, in Kitakyushu, Fukuoka, Japan. A self-taught pianist, he began composing music at age 11 and completed his first band composition at age 15. In 2009, he earned a degree from the Toho College of Music where he was a student of Jun Nagao. His works have been performed in many countries and have been recorded on CDs by many bands in such countries as the United States, Japan, Germany, and Belgium. Also in 2009, he received the 42nd Kitakyushu Cultural Award for his compositions.

== Compositions ==
=== Concert Band ===
Title	Grade	Duration	Publisher	Description
10W-60	4	09'08"	Beriato Music / Hal Leonard Europe	
Across the Sunlit Path	1.5	03'50"	Eighth Note Publications / Alfred	
Amber Moon	2.5	04'30"	Grand Mesa Music	
Anjin: Blue Eyed Samurai	3	07'00"	Hafabra Music	
Ascent	4	05'25"	Eighth Note Publications / Alfred	
As Spring Arrives	3.5	07'52"	C. L. Barnhouse	
As The Dawn Breaks	2	02'26"	C. L. Barnhouse	
Axis	3	02'50"	Beriato Music / Hal Leonard Europe	
Beyond the Light and Darkness	3	04'51"	C. L. Barnhouse	
The Big Dipper	4	00'41"	FJH Music	from "Four Short Fanfares"
Bravissimo!	3	02'50"	Beriato Music / Hal Leonard Europe	
Call to Freedom	1.5	01'30"	Grand Mesa Music	
Days Remembered	3	04'30"	Molenaar Edition	
Departures	3.5	03'35"	Tierolff	
Eternal Promise	3	03'00"	Molenaar Edition	
The Explorers of Orion	2.5	04'15"	C. L. Barnhouse	
Exultate	3	03'36"	Beriato Music / Hal Leonard Europe	
Fanfare and Festive Hymn	0.5	02'05"	Eighth Note Publications / Alfred	
Fanfare and Jubilation	3	04'56"	Beriato Music / Hal Leonard Europe	
Festiva Jubiloso	3	06'30"	Molenaar Edition	
Firefly Stars	4	00'44"	FJH Music	from "Four Short Fanfares"
The Flame of Majesty	4	01'35"	FJH Music	from "Three Short Fanfares"
Flower Blooming	4	00'34"	FJH Music	from "Four Short Fanfares"
The Glorious Century	4	01'09"	FJH Music	from "Four Three Fanfares"
The Grace of Oaths	3	05'10"	Eighth Note Publications / Alfred	
Homeward Voyage	3	06'10"	Beriato Music / Hal Leonard Europe	
The Hope of Tomorrow	1.5	03'05"	C. L. Barnhouse	
Impulse Power	0.5	01'34"	C. L. Barnhouse	
Let It Shine Like a Star	3.5	06'30"	Eighth Note Publications / Alfred	
Liberty Fanfare	4	05'24"	TRN Music	
Lights in the Mirror	4	08'00"	Molenaar Edition	
Line of Ants	1	01'20"	TRN Music	
Medieval Hymn Variations -In Praise of Guido d'Arezzo-	4	07'50"	Molenaar Edition	
A New Day Dawning	2	03'50"	Eighth Note Publications / Alfred	
Nexus for the Future	3	03'57"	Molenaar Edition	
Of Glory and Celebration	3	03'15"	Hafabra Music	
Of Ideal Infinity	3	06'15"	Molenaar Edition	
On Wings of Magic	3	05'59"	C. L. Barnhouse	
Pacifica	2.5	02'46"	C. L. Barnhouse	
Procession of Time	4	07'20"	Molenaar Edition	
The Promise of Hope	2	01'50"	C. L. Barnhouse	
Rejoice!	3.5	06'57"	Beriato Music / Hal Leonard Europe	
Remembrance	2.5	05'50"	TRN Music	
Sailing Day	2.5	06'10"	Hafabra Music	
Seascapes	4	00'46"	FJH Music	from "Three Short Fanfares"
Soaring	3.5	06'25"	Grand Mesa Music	
The Sounds of Spring	3	02'44"	Grand Mesa Music	Collaboration with Shizuka Sato
Spirals of Light	3.5	03'05"	Beriato Music / Hal Leonard Europe	
Starry Heavens	3	05'14"	Grand Mesa Music	
Star Trails	1.5	03'30"	Eighth Note Publications / Alfred	
Tales of a Distant Star	2.5	04'30"	Hafabra Music	
To A New Journey	3	06'17"	C. L. Barnhouse	
Toward the Bright Future	3	06'48"	Beriato Music / Hal Leonard Europe	
Ubuntu	4	00'38"	FJH Music	from "Four Three Fanfares"
Voyage into the Blue	3.5	08'45"	Beriato Music / Hal Leonard Europe	
Wind Capsule	3	03'36"	Beriato Music / Hal Leonard Europe	
Weekend in the City	3.5	08'50"	Molenaar Edition	
Wind on the Hill	3	05'27"	Molenaar Edition	

=== Fanfare Band ===
Title	Grade	Duration	Publisher	Description
Days Remembered	3	04'30"	Molenaar Edition	
Eternal Promise	3	03'00"	Molenaar Edition	
Festiva Jubiloso	3	06'30"	Molenaar Edition	
Lights in the Mirror	4	08'00"	Molenaar Edition	
Nexus for the Future	3	03'57"	Molenaar Edition	
Of Ideal Infinity	3	06'15"	Molenaar Edition	
Weekend in the City	3.5	08'50"	Molenaar Edition	
Winds on the Hill	3	05'27"	Molenaar Edition	

=== Flex Band ===
Title	Grade	Duration	Publisher	Description
Flower Crown	2.5	05'01"	Brain Music	
Latte Macchiato	3	04'30"	Molenaar Edition	
Legacy	3	05'40"	Brain Music	
In Seizing the Distant light	3	06'11"	Brain Music	
To a New Horizon	2.5	05'00"	Brain Music	
The Wind Blows Where It Will	2.5	07'00"	Brain Music	
Witherless Flower	2.5	05'00"	Brain Music	

=== String Orchestra ===
Title	Grade	Duration	Publisher	Description
Remembrance	2.5	05'50"	TRN Music	

=== Ensembe ===
Title	Grade	Duration	Instrumentation	Publisher	Description
Alley Cats	4	06'30"	Solo with Piano accompaniment	Molenaar Edition	
Bari Bari Bassi	4	03'00"	Euphonium + Tuba Quartet	Star Music Publishing	
The Moon Illuminates the Love Tenderly	3	05'00"	Flex Trio	Brain Music	
Prelude, Ballad and Celebration	4	04'10"	Brass Sextet	TRN Music	
Raindrops	4	04'40"	Woodwind Trio & Marimba	Tapspace	
A Simple Song of Love	2	03'00"	Solo with Piano accompaniment	Alfred	
Three Fruits	3	05'00"	Flute Trio	Brain Music	
Weekend in the City	4	08'50"	Solo with Piano accompaniment	Molenaar Edition	

== Arrangements ==
=== Concert Band ===
Title	Composer	Grade	Duration	Publisher	Description
Capriol Suite	Peter Warlock	3.5	09'44"	Molenaar Edition	
Civic Fanfare	Edward Elgar	4	01'23"	TRN Music	
Cuban Overture	George Gershwin	6	09'30"	Tierolff	
Joyful Variants; Based on Themes of Beethoven	Ludwig van Beethoven	3	02'45"	C. L. Barnhouse	
Kimigayo March	Kozo Yoshimoto	2.5	03'00"	TRN Music	
A Portrait of Henry C. Work	Henry Clay Work	2	04'20"	Eighth Note Publications / Alfred	
Rhapsody in Blue	George Gershwin	5	17'00"	Molenaar Edition	
The Soarting Eagle	John N. Klohr	3	02'20"	TRN Music	
Three Preludes	George Gershwin	5	06'00"	Molenaar Edition	
Trombone Concerto	Nikolai Rimsky-Korsakov	4	07'10"	Eighth Note Publications / Alfred	
Warship March	Tokichi Setoguchi	3	03'00"	TRN Music	

=== Flex Band ===
Title	Composer	Grade	Duration	Publisher	Description
Londonderry Air	Traditional	3	03'36"	Brain Music / Bravo Music	
March Majestic	Scott Joplin	3	02'40"	Molenaar Edition	
Over the Waves	Juventino Rosas	2.5	04'23"	Beriato Music / Hal Leonard MGB	
