= Kiso-Hirasawa Station =

Railway station in Shiojiri, Nagano Prefecture, Japan

Kiso-Hirasawa Station 木曽平沢駅
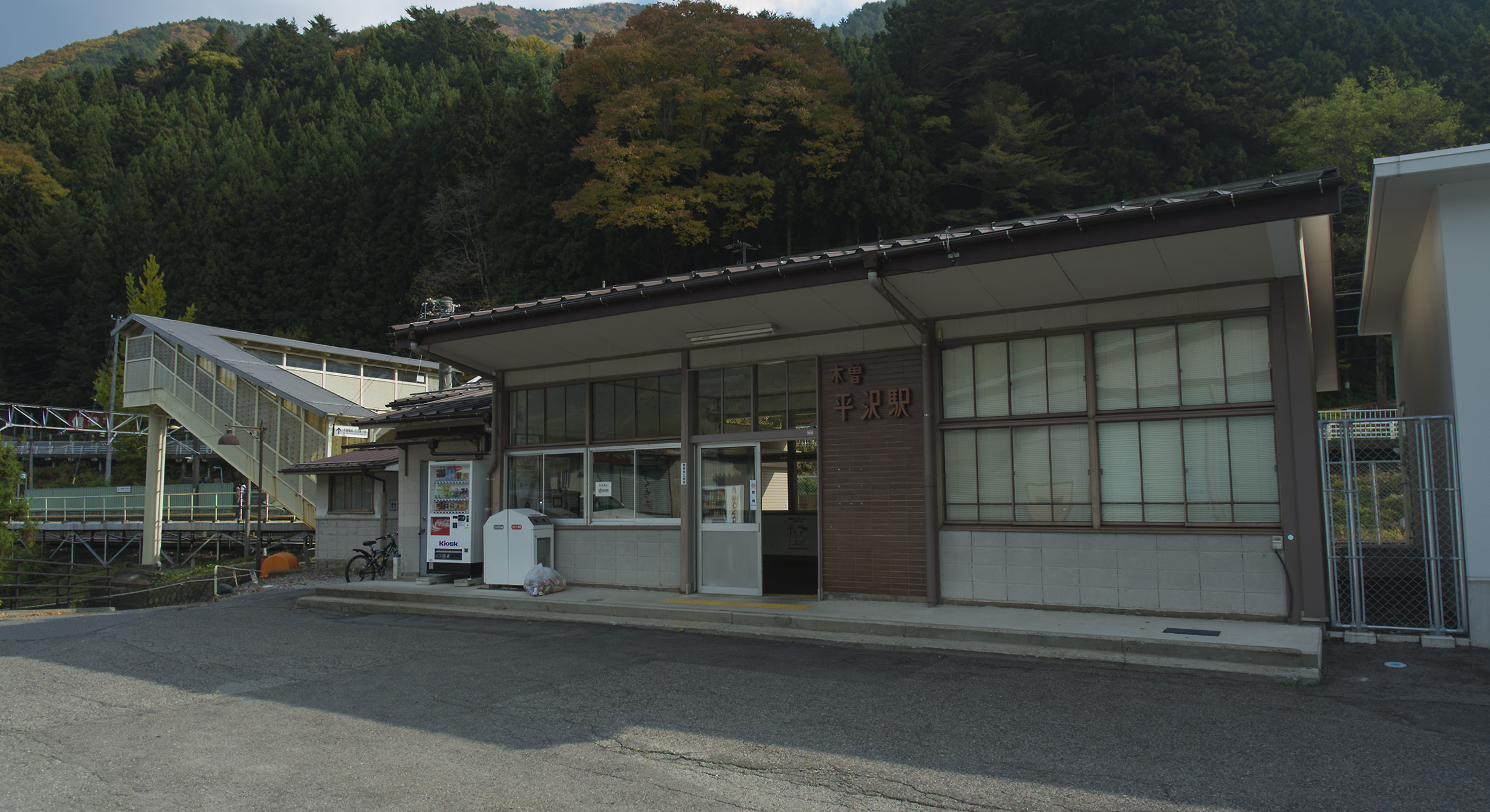
- Kiso-Hirasawa Station in November 2013

General information
- Location: Kiso-Hirasawa, Shiojiri-shi, Nagano-ken 399-6302; Japan
- Coordinates: 35.9791°N 137.8326°E
- Elevation: 914.9 meters
- Operator: JR Central
- Line: Chūō Main Line
- Distance: 241.4 km from Tokyo
- Platforms: 2 side platforms
- Tracks: 2

Other information
- Status: Unstaffed

History
- Opened: 5 June 1930; 96 years ago

Passengers
- FY2015: 46 daily
Location
- Location within Nagano Prefecture Location within Japan

Kiso-Hirasawa Station (木曽平沢駅, Kiso-Hirasawa-eki) is a railway station of the Chūō Main Line, Central Japan Railway Company in the city of Shiojiri, Nagano Prefecture, Japan.

== Lines ==
Kiso-Hirasawa Station is served by the JR Tōkai Chūō Main Line, and is located 241.4 kilometers from the official starting point of the line at Tokyo and 155.5 kilometers from Nagoya.

== Layout ==
The station has two ground-level side platforms connected by a footbridge. The station is unattended.

=== Platforms ===
1	■ Chūō Main Line	For Shiojiri and Nagano
2	■ Chūō Main Line	For Nakatsugawa and Nagoya

== Adjacent stations ==
←	Service	→
JR Central Chūō Main Line
Niekawa	Local	Narai

== History ==
Kiso-Hirasawa Station was opened on 5 June 1930. On 1 April 1987, it became part of JR Tōkai.

== Passenger statistics ==
In fiscal 2015, the station was used by an average of 46 passengers daily (boarding passengers only).

== Surrounding area ==
- Hirasawa Post Office
- National Route 19

== See also ==
- List of railway stations in Japan
