= Naoya Takei =

Japanese sculptor

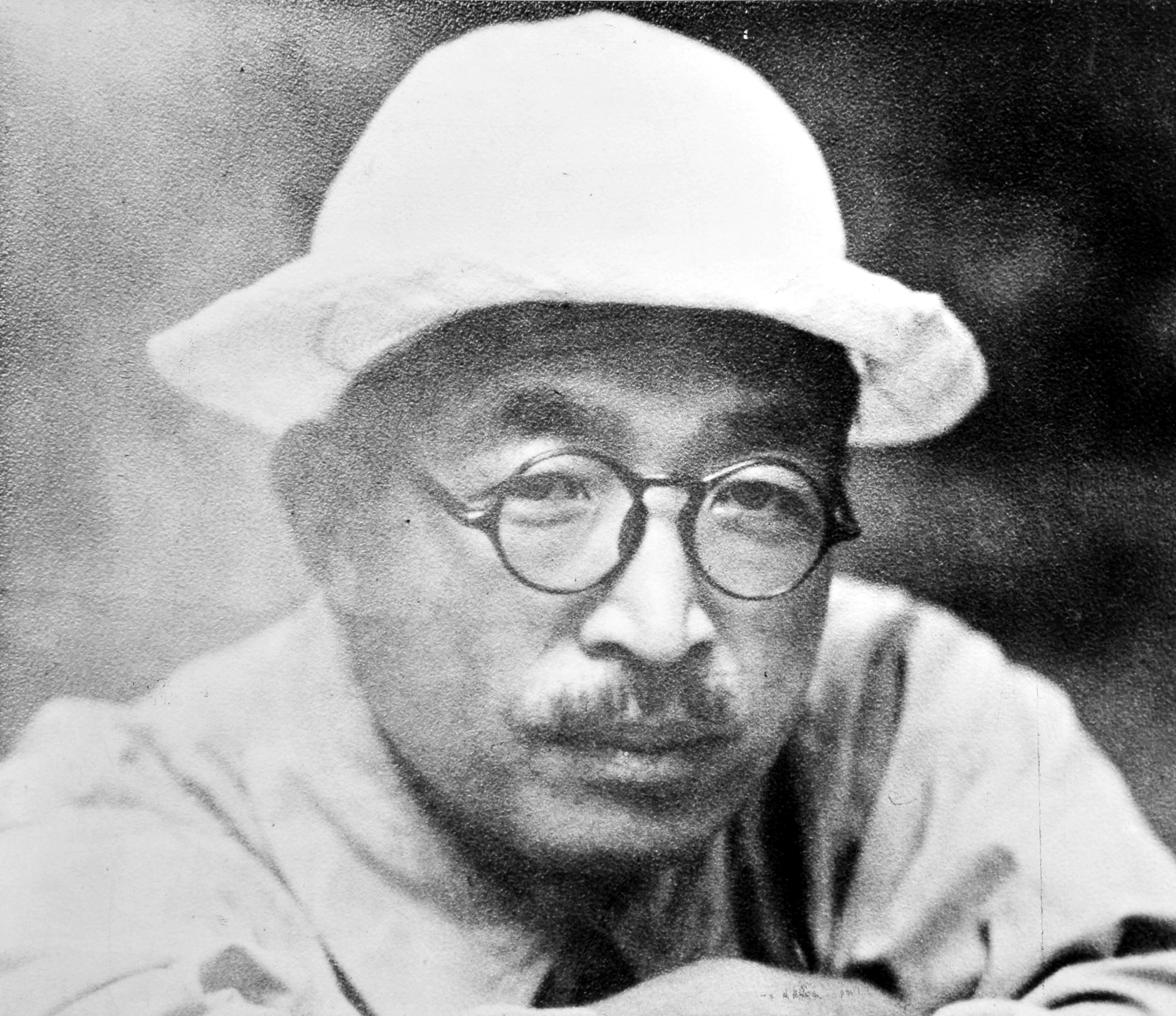
- Naoya Takei
- Born: 16 June 1893; Okaya, Japan
- Died: 5 February 1940 (aged 46); Tokyo, Japan
- Occupation: Sculptor

Naoya Takei (武井 直也, Takei Naoya; 16 June 1893 – 5 February 1940) was a Japanese sculptor. His work was part of the sculpture event in the art competition at the 1932 Summer Olympics.

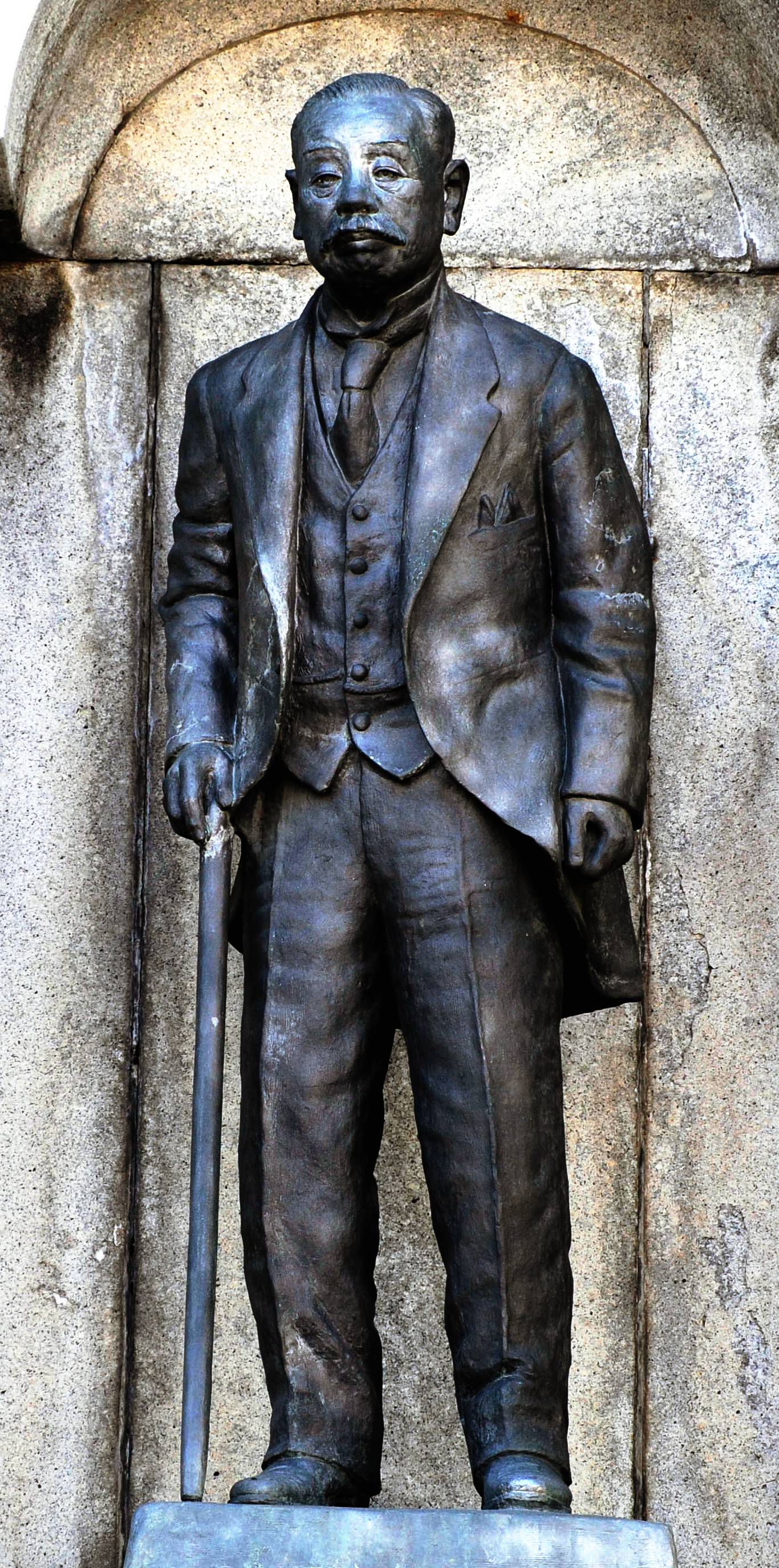
Ozawa Fukutarō ō Juzō (Naoya Takei, 1936)
