= Okaya, Nagano =

Okaya 岡谷市
- City
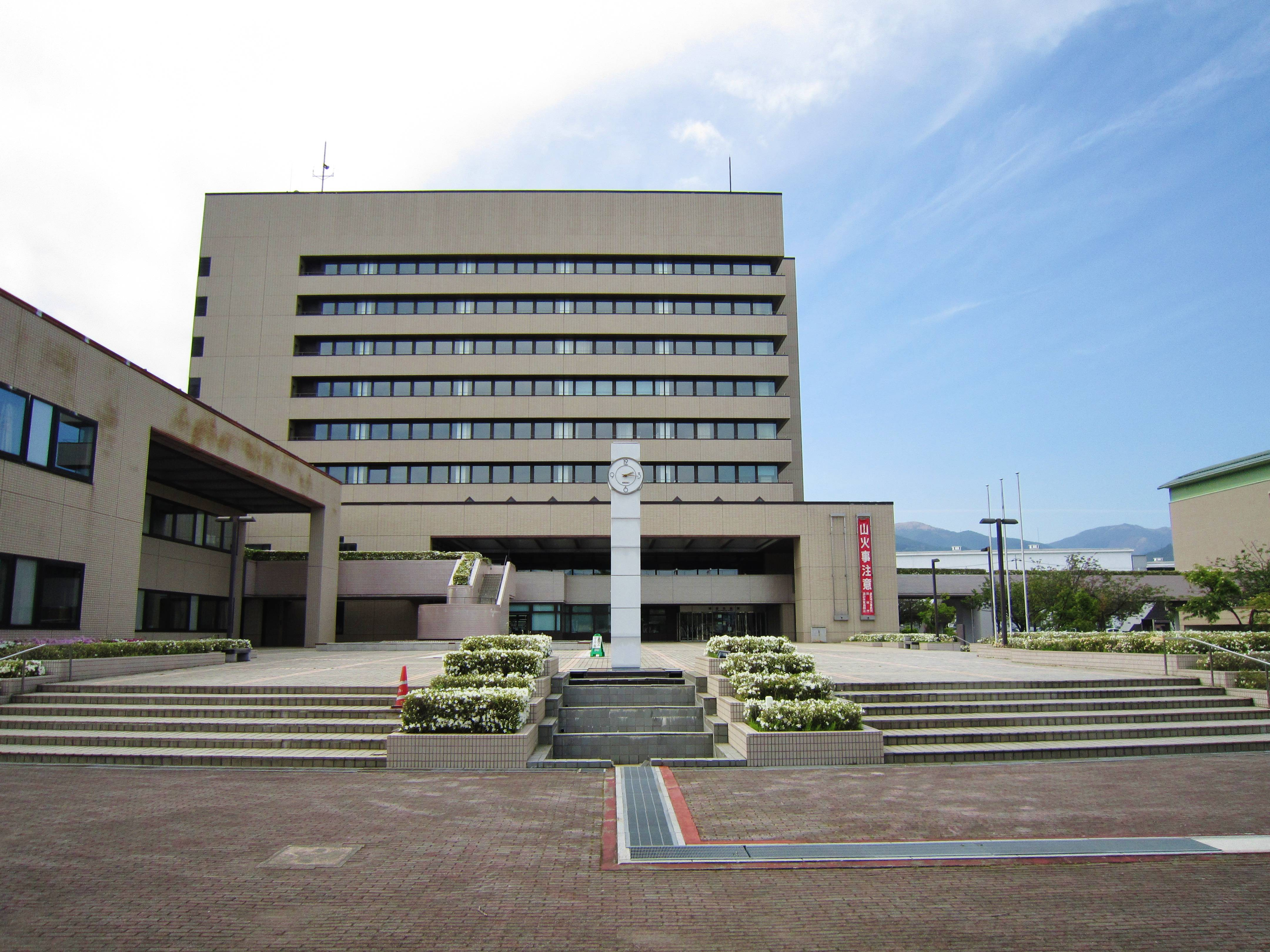
- Okaya City Hall

- Flag Seal

- Location of Okaya in Nagano

- Coordinates: 36°4′1.6″N 138°2′57.5″E
- Country: Japan
- Region: Chūbu (Kōshin'etsu)
- Prefecture: Nagano

Government
  - Mayor: Kazuma Sōde (from September 2023)

Area
  - Total: 85.10 km^{2} (32.86 sq mi)

Population (February 2019)
  - Total: 48,616
  - Density: 571.3/km^{2} (1,480/sq mi)
- Time zone: UTC+9 (Japan Standard Time)
- Symbols
  - Tree: Taxus cuspidata
  - Flower: Azalea
- Phone number: 0266-23-4811
- Address: Saiwaichō 8-1, Okaya-shi, Nagano-ken 394-8510
- Website: Official website

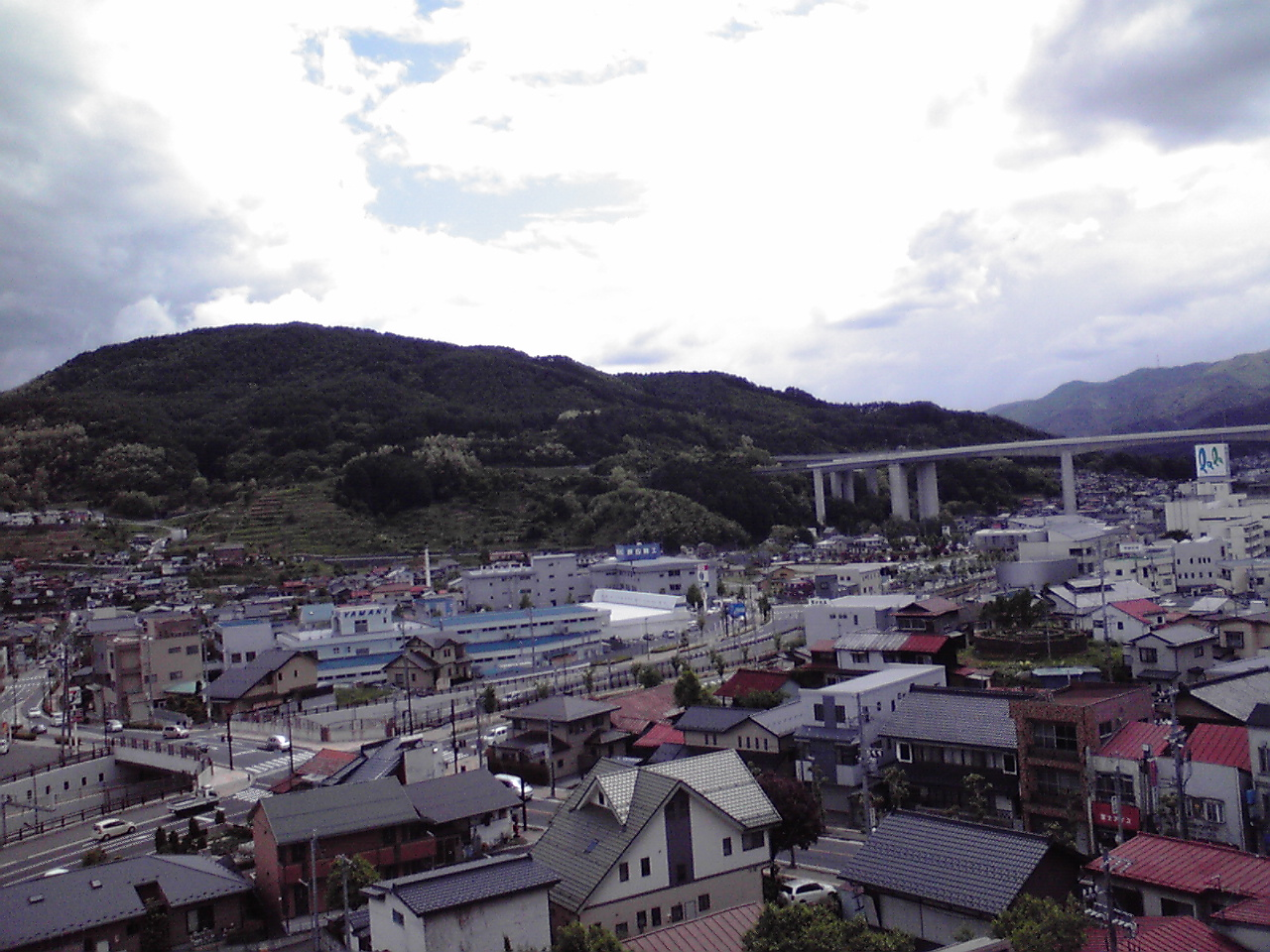
View of Okaya

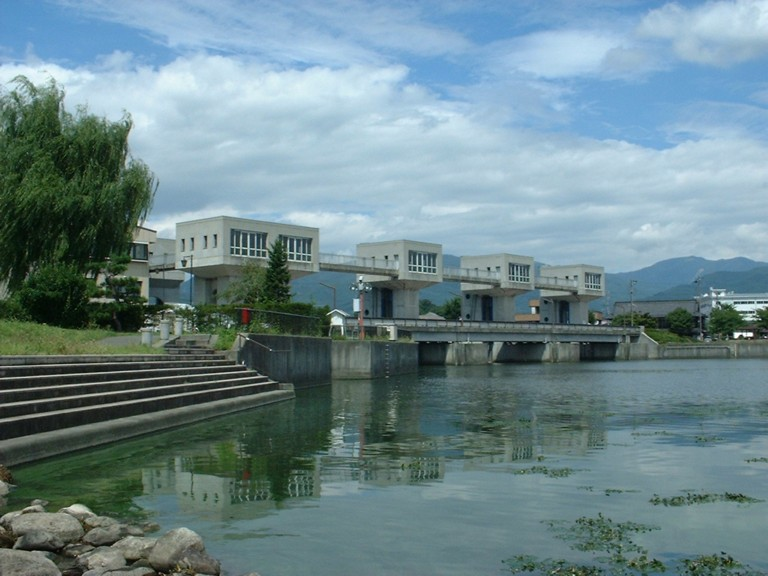
Tenryū River flowing out of Lake Suwa in Okaya

Okaya (岡谷市, Okaya-shi; Japanese pronunciation: [ó̞.kä̀.jä̀, ò̞.kä́.jä́.ɕì]) is a city located in Nagano Prefecture, Japan. As of 1 February 2019, the city had an estimated population of 48,616 in 19,257 households, and a population density of 570 persons per km². The total area of the city is 85.10 square kilometres (32.86 sq mi).

== Geography ==
Okaya is located in central Nagano Prefecture at the western shores of Lake Suwa and the headwaters of the Tenryū River.

=== Surrounding municipalities ===
- Nagano Prefecture
  - Matsumoto
  - Shimosuwa
  - Shiojiri
  - Suwa
  - Tatsuno

=== Climate ===
The city has a climate characterized by characterized by hot and humid summers, and relatively mild winters (Köppen climate classification Cfa). The average annual temperature in Okaya is 10.6 °C. The average annual rainfall is 1281 mm with September as the wettest month. The temperatures are highest on average in August, at around 23.6 °C, and lowest in January, at around -1.9 °C.

== Demographics ==
Per Japanese census data, the population of Okaya has declined over the past 50 years.

Historical population
Year	Pop.	±%
1940	58,443	—
1950	52,288	−10.5%
1960	52,256	−0.1%
1970	60,350	+15.5%
1980	62,210	+3.1%
1990	59,849	−3.8%
2000	56,401	−5.8%
2010	52,859	−6.3%
2020	47,790	−9.6%

== History ==
The area of present-day Okaya was part of ancient Shinano Province. The village of Hirano was created with the establishment of the municipalities system on April 1, 1889. Hirano was raised to directly city status on April 1, 1936 and was renamed Okaya, and is one of the eleven villages in Japan which have skipped the intermediate town stage to directly become a city. Okaya annexed neighbouring Shijiri town and Chikumaji village on January 1, 1951, followed by Minato village on January 1, 1955, Kawagishi village on February 1, 1955 and Osachi village on March 25, 1957.

== Government ==
Okaya has a mayor-council form of government with a directly elected mayor and a unicameral city legislature of 18 members. The city is grouped into an electoral district with Shimosuwa, which contributes four members to the Nagano Prefectural Assembly. In terms of national politics, Okaya is grouped with Chino, Shiojiri, Suwa, Kiso District, Nagano, Suwa District, Nagano to form Nagano 4th District in the lower house of the National Diet.

== Economy ==
The region's local industry is predominantly made up of medium and small-size businesses, but some larger corporations, including Seiko Epson, Olympus and Kyocera have factories in Okaya.

From the Meiji period through the early Shōwa period (1868-1930), the Okaya area was one of Japan's largest producers of export-quality silk, due to the introduction of a new silk-reeling machine from overseas. After the World War II, Okaya established itself as a manufacturing city of precision machinery, focusing on producing products such as watches and cameras.

== Education ==
Okaya has seven public elementary schools and four public middle schools operated by the city government. The city has three public high schools operated by the Nagano Prefectural Board of Education.

== Transportation ==
=== Railway ===
- East Japan Railway Company - Chūō Main Line
  - Okaya - Kawagishi

=== Highway ===
- Nagano Expressway
- National Route 20
- National Route 142

== International relations ==
- The city is twinned with Mount Pleasant, Michigan, United States. In 2005 it donated forty trees to Mount Pleasant, honoring forty years of association between the two cities.

== Local attractions ==
- Okaya is known for its Onbashira and Taiko festivals, and unagi (eel) dishes.
- Okaya Silk Museum, which opened its doors in 1964 to remember the importance of the Japanese silk industry to the area. Besides pictures of the old manufacturing techniques and people working in the silk reeling manufactures, there is old machinery and a full-functioning manufacture that is run by the Miyasaka Silk Reeling Co. in the museum.
- Nashikubo ruins, a Jomon period settlement trace and National Historic Monument.
- Enrei Onodachi Memorial Festival, the shortest festival in Japan, and Enrei Onodachi Park

== Notable people from Okaya ==
- Watanabe Kunitake, former Deputy Prime Minister
- Takeo Takei, painter and children's puppetmaker (born in Hirano Village, present-day Okaya)
