= Hiraide ruins =

Archaeological site in Shiojiri, Japan

- 平出遺跡 (Japanese)
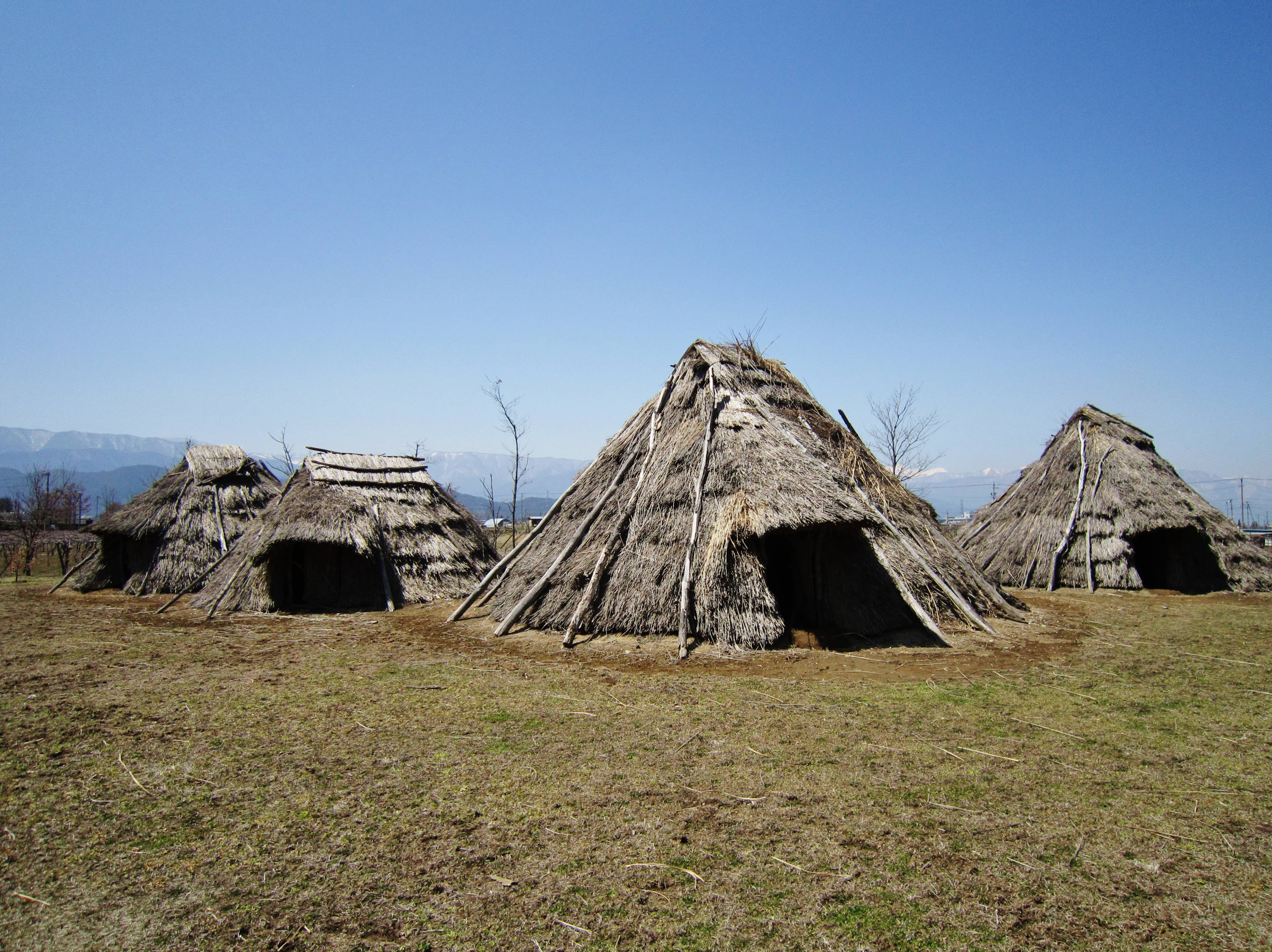
- Hiraide Historic Site Park reconstructed pit houses

- Hiraide ruins Hiraide ruins (Japan)
- 36°06′13″N 137°56′32″E
- Type: settlement
- Periods: Jōmon to Heian period
- Location: Shiojiri, Nagano, Japan
- Region: Chūbu region

Site notes
- Public access: yes (park and museum)

The Hiraide ruins (平出遺跡, Hiraide iseki) is a complex archaeological site containing the ruins of an early Jōmon period to early Heian period settlement located in the Soga neighborhood of the city of Shiojiri, Nagano in the Chūbu region of Japan. The site was designated a National Historic Site of Japan in 1952.

== Overview ==
The Hiraide site is located in a rural area in the southernmost point of the Matsumoto Plain of central Nagano Prefecture. The ruins are widely spread in strips along the Shibukawa River ranging approximately one kilometer east-west by 300 meters north-to-south, and also encompass three kofun burial mounds. The site appears to have been continuously occupied by a large settlement from the early Jōmon period extending well into the Heian period. It was once considered one of the three major archaeological sites in Japan, along with the Toro Site in Shizuoka, and the Togariishi Site in Chino, Nagano. It was excavated beginning in 1952 and over 20,000 artifacts have been found.

The Jōmon period remains include 116 pit dwellings dating to about 4,500 to 5,500 years ago, with Jōmon pottery decorated with luxurious patterns and stone tools. Also found were many relics and artifacts related to faith such as clay figurines and standing stones. No residence sites from the Yayoi period (300 BC–300 AD) have been found, but there was an abundance of Yayoi pottery artifacts, indicating that the settlement still existed during that time. In the Kofun period (300 to 538 AD), the foundations for over 128 houses have been found, many of large size, and with one or more hearths. Artifacts included many iron implements, Haji ware and Sue ware pottery, carbonized cultivated cereals such as rice and millet, as well as the bones of cattle and horses. An unusual two-meter tall tower of roof tiles from the Nara period was also found. Another 50 house sites from the Heian period have been identified, together with glazed pottery fragments. These artifacts indicate that this settlement existed for thousands of years in this same location.

The site is now an archaeological park covering 56,450 square meters, with numerous reconstructed buildings, a museum (the Shiojiri City Hiraide Museum (塩尻市立平出博物館, Shiojiri Shiritsu Hiraide Hakubutsukan), and public activities. It is located approximately 2 kilometers southwest of Shiojiri Station on the JR Central Chūō Main Line.

== See also ==
- List of Historic Sites of Japan (Nagano)
