= Seba-juku =

Nakasendō station

Coordinates: 36°5′14.4″N 137°54′56.9″E

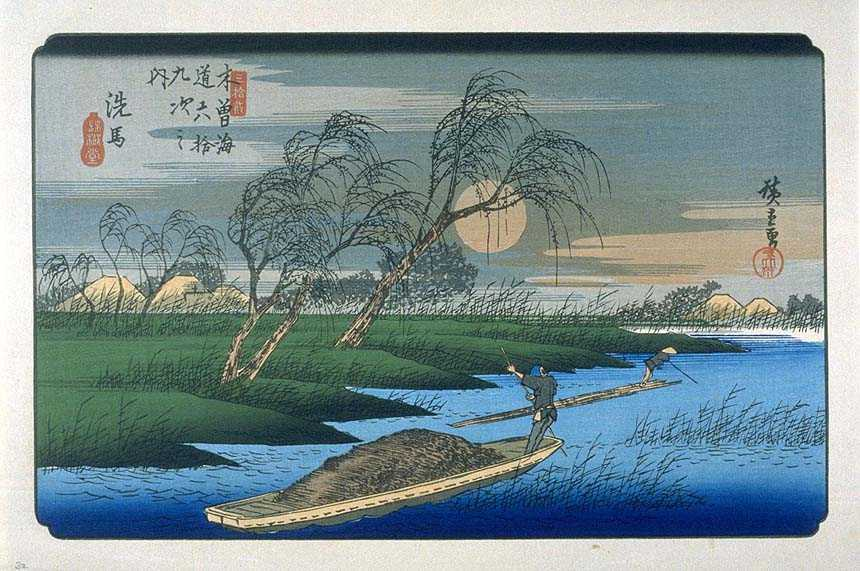
Hiroshige's print of Seba-juku, part of The Sixty-nine Stations of the Kiso Kaidō series

Seba-juku (洗馬宿, Seba-juku) was the thirty-first of the sixty-nine stations of the Nakasendō. It is located in the central part of the present-day city of Shiojiri, Nagano Prefecture, Japan.

== History ==
The area was named "Seba," which means "washing a horse," when a retainer of Minamoto no Yoshinaka washed his master's horse in the waters here. Seba-juku was originally established in 1614, along with Shiojiri-juku and Motoyama-juku, in order to accommodate the change in the Nakasendō's route.

== Neighboring post towns ==
Nakasendō
Shiojiri-juku - Seba-juku - Motoyama-juku
