= Shiojiri, Nagano =

Shiojiri 塩尻市
- City
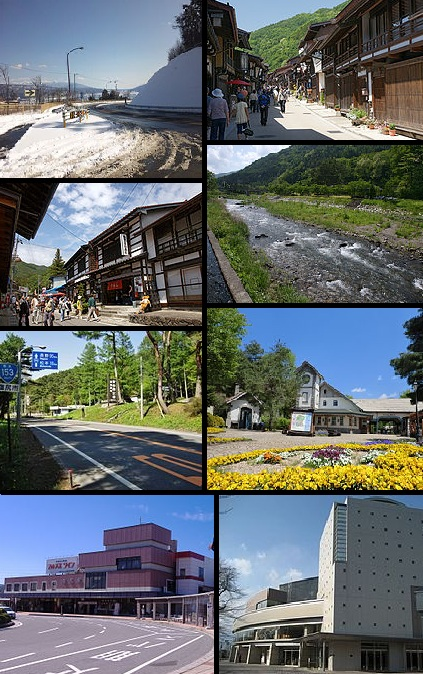
- Shioziri Pass, Nakasendo Narai-juku; Kiso-Hirasawa, Narai River; Route 153 Utou Pass, Tirol-no-mori; Shiojiri Station, Raisin Hall

- Flag Seal

- Location of Shiojiri in Nagano Prefecture

- Coordinates: 36°6′53.9″N 137°57′12.4″E
- Country: Japan
- Region: Chūbu (Kōshin'etsu)
- Prefecture: Nagano

Government
  - Mayor: Takashi Momose

Area
  - Total: 289.98 km^{2} (111.96 sq mi)

Population (March 2019)
  - Total: 67,240
  - Density: 231.9/km^{2} (600.6/sq mi)
- Time zone: UTC+9 (Japan Standard Time)
- Phone number: 0263-52-0280
- Address: 3-3 Daimon Nanabanmachi, Shiojiri-shi, Nagano-ken 399-0786
- Climate: Cfa/Dfa
- Website: Official website
- Symbols
- Flower: Chinese bellflower
- Tree: Taxus cuspidata

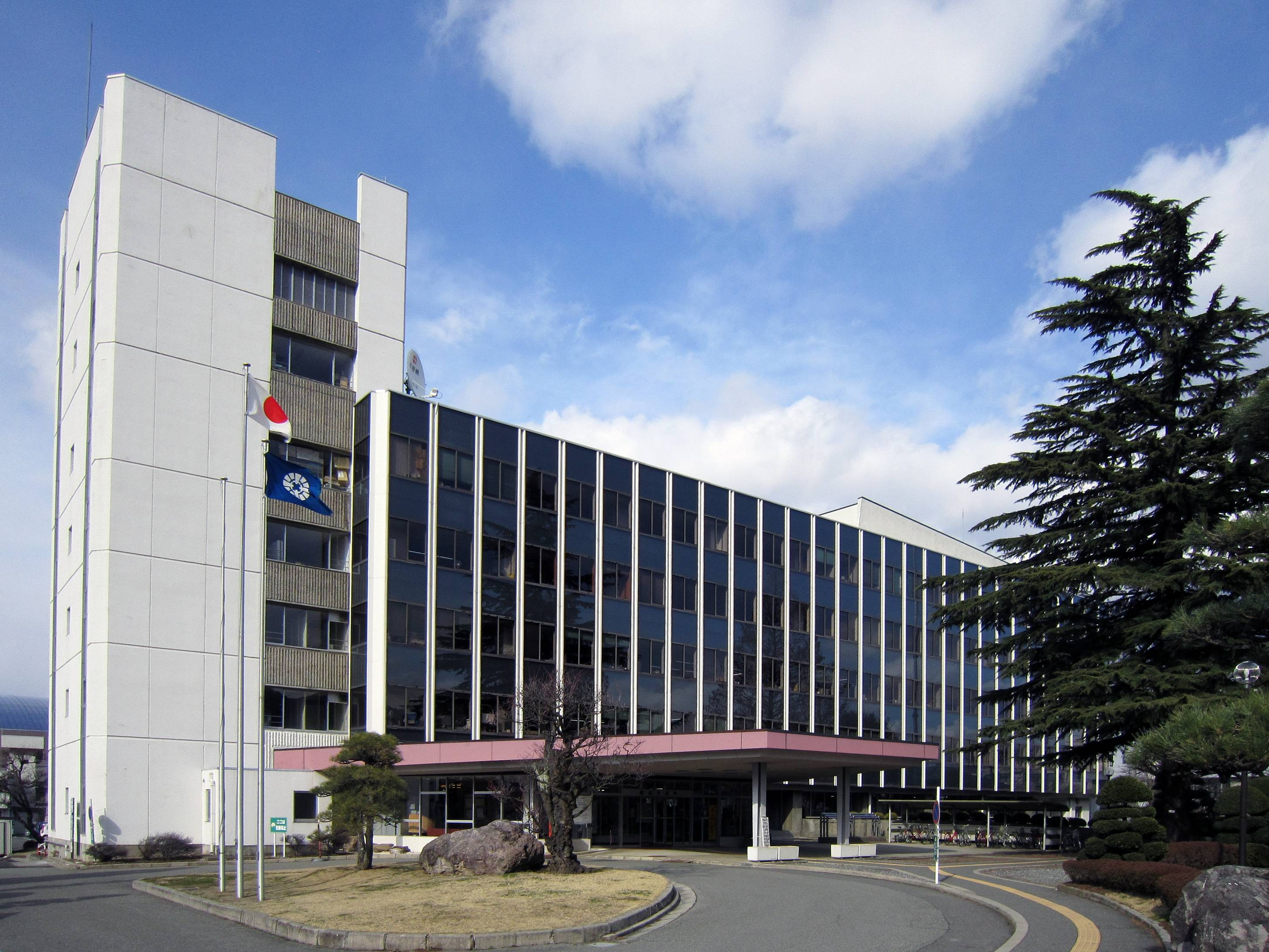
Shiojiri City Hall

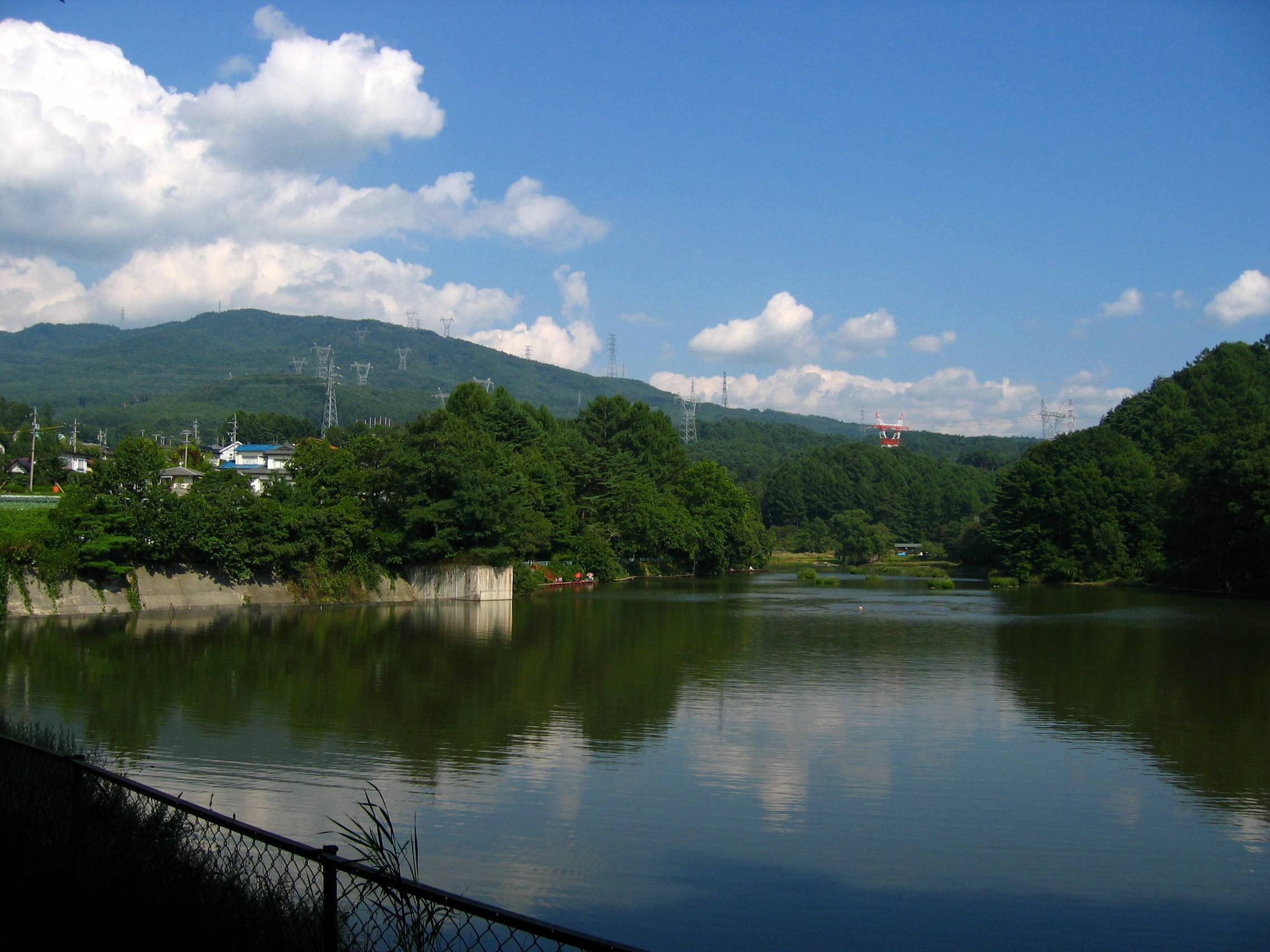
Lake Midoriko near Shiojiri Pass

Shiojiri (塩尻市, Shiojiri-shi) is a city located in Nagano Prefecture, Japan. As of 1 March 2019, the city had an estimated population of 67,240 in 27,602 households, and a population density of 230 persons per km². The total area of the city is 289.98 square kilometres (111.96 sq mi).

== Geography ==
Shiojiri is located in central Nagano Prefecture, in the southern end of the Matsumoto Basin.

=== Surrounding municipalities ===
- Nagano Prefecture
  - Asahi
  - Ina
  - Kiso Town
  - Kiso Village
  - Matsumoto
  - Minamiminowa
  - Okaya
  - Tatsuno

=== Climate ===
The city has a climate characterized by hot and humid summers, and relatively mild winters (Köppen climate classification Cfa). The average annual temperature in Shiojiri is 11.4 °C. The average annual rainfall is 1161 mm with September as the wettest month. The temperatures are highest on average in August, at around 24.6 °C, and lowest in January, at around -1.1 °C.

Climate data for Esashi (1991−2020 normals, extremes 1941−present)
Month	Jan	Feb	Mar	Apr	May	Jun	Jul	Aug	Sep	Oct	Nov	Dec	Year
Record high °C (°F)	12.7 (54.9)	16.3 (61.3)	21.9 (71.4)	28.2 (82.8)	32.0 (89.6)	32.5 (90.5)	35.9 (96.6)	36.2 (97.2)	33.3 (91.9)	27.0 (80.6)	21.8 (71.2)	17.8 (64.0)	36.2 (97.2)
Record low °C (°F)	−17.0 (1.4)	−17.7 (0.1)	−14.2 (6.4)	−7.6 (18.3)	−2.1 (28.2)	2.9 (37.2)	9.1 (48.4)	9.1 (48.4)	0.8 (33.4)	−3.6 (25.5)	−7.6 (18.3)	−14.9 (5.2)	−17.7 (0.1)
Source: Japan Meteorological Agency

== History ==
Shiojiri is located in former Shinano Province. The name derives from the fact that salt sellers would travel from the shores, where salt was made from seawater, inland where salt couldn't be produced, and Shiojiri being equidistant to the ocean to the east and west, was where the sellers from both directions would end their trips. Hence the name, that means "salt end/butt". During the Edo period, Narai-juku, Shiojiri-shuku and Seba-juku developed as post stations on the Nakasendō highway connecting Edo with Kyoto. The village of Shiojiri was established with the creation of the modern municipalities system on April 1, 1889. It was elevated to town status on April 1, 1927. Shiojiri annexed the villages of Kataoka, Hirooka, Souga and Chikumazi on April 1, 1959 and was elevated to city status. Shiojiri lost Kitauchida hamlet and Gakenoyu hamlet (both in Kataoka ward) in 1960 and 1961 to Matsumoto city due to border adjustments. On June 28, 1961, Shiojiri absorbed the village of Seba and the village of Narakawa on April 1, 2005.

== Demographics ==
Per Japanese census data, the population of Shiojiri has recently plateaued after several decades of growth.

Historical population
Year	Pop.	±%
1940	37,585	—
1950	47,357	+26.0%
1960	43,783	−7.5%
1970	47,113	+7.6%
1980	57,417	+21.9%
1990	61,420	+7.0%
2000	67,747	+10.3%
2010	67,638	−0.2%
2020	67,241	−0.6%

== Government ==
Shiojiri has a mayor-council form of government with a directly elected mayor and a unicameral city legislature of 18 members. Takashi Momose is serving as the current mayor of Shiojiri since 2022.

== Economy ==
The economy of Shiojiri is largely agricultural, with grapes, apples, pears, and wine production as major components. The manufacturing sector includes precision instrumentation. Epson has major production and R&D facilities of inkjet printheads and the Seiko wristwatches in Shiojiri. Companies that have manufacturing operations in Shiojiri include Nidec Copal, Sanko, Keio Juuki Seibi, Kissei Pharmaceutical, and Resonac Ceramics.

== Education ==
Shiojiri has nine public elementary schools and five public middle schools operated by the city government, and one public elementary school and one public middle school shared with neighbouring Tatsuno. The city also has two public high schools operated by the Nagano Prefectural Board of Education, and one private high school. The Matsumoto Dental University is also located in Shiojiri.

== Transportation ==
=== Railway ===
- East Japan Railway Company - Chūō Main Line
  - Midoriko - Shiojiri
- East Japan Railway Company - Shinonoi Line
  - Shiojiri - Hirooka
- JR Tōkai - Chūō Main Line
  - Seba - Hideshio - Niekawa - Kiso-Hirasawa - Narai

=== Highway ===
- Nagano Expressway
- National Route 19
- National Route 20
- National Route 153
- National Route 361

=== Airport ===
- Matsumoto Airport - The southern portion of its runway and the western half of the apron are located in Shiojiri.

== Sister cities ==
=== Within Japan ===
- Itoigawa, Niigata
- Minamiizu, Shizuoka

=== Overseas ===
- Mishawaka, Indiana, United States

== Local attractions ==
Shiojiri is the location of the Hiraide ruins, one of the three largest ancient ruins in Japan. Artifacts from the Jōmon period through the Heian period have been discovered there, as well as the remains of 47 ancient dwellings.

- Enrei Onodachi Memorial Festival, the shortest festival in Japan, and Enrei Onodachi Park
