= Naoya Inose =

Naoya Inose (猪瀬 直哉, Inose Naoya; born 27 January 1988) is a Japanese visual artist. He lives and works in London and Tokyo.

== Early life and education ==
Naoya Inose was born and raised in Kanagawa. In 2012 he graduated from Tokyo University of the Arts, where he specialised in oil painting. He got 2015 - 2016 Japanese Government Overseas Research Programme for Artists then 2017 UAL Chelsea College of Art And Design, London, MA (Fine art). He lives and works in Tokyo and London. His works are included in the Takahashi Collection and in the Benetton Foundation.

== Work ==
Inose's work explores the tension between the natural world and its grasping appropriation by human influence. Inose uses oil painting techniques to create both meticulously realistic landscapes and abstract oil paintings on canvas. His works of art create an inquiry of our relationship and understanding of nature. Inose also creates a debate on the role of the original masterpieces and how this has changes in the contemporary postmodern world. His home country Japan, which is constantly threatened by natural disasters, is a source of inspiration for his work: "Japan is well-known for its disasters, the country is in fact still recovering from the latest tsunami. Japanese people are always afraid of when the next disaster will strike. This may be the reason why the fantastical is such a popular theme in famous film productions like Godzilla, which is widely thought to be a metaphor for the war. This is the reason why I think art goes beyond the immortalisation of reality. Art exists to portray a much deeper meaning. This also explains why my own art is a mixture of reality and the fantastic as I use the latter to expose the problems I see around me."

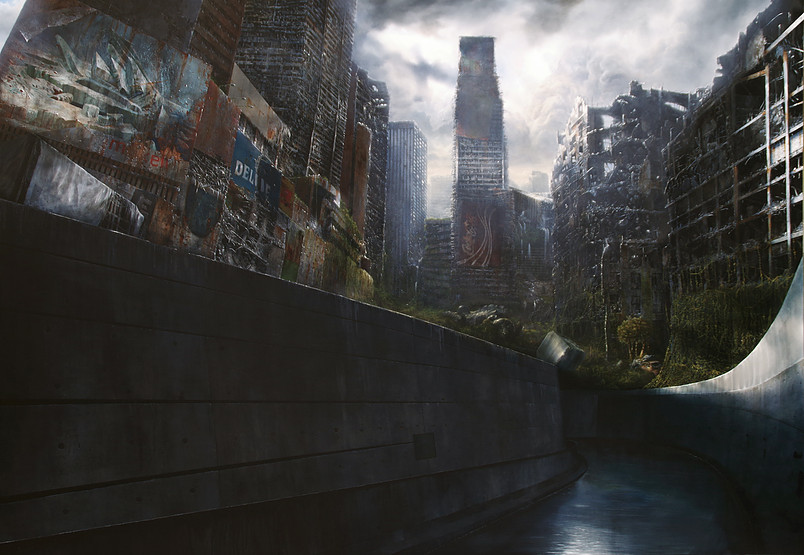
Cultural Landscape (2013), Naoya Inose

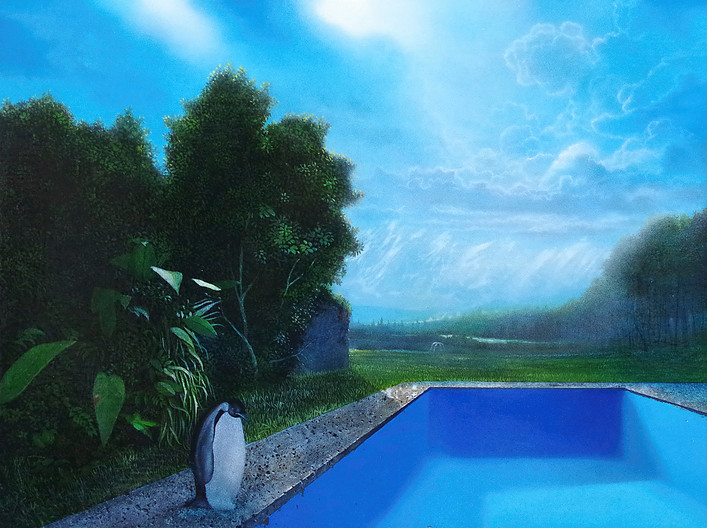
Almost Blue (2015), Naoya Inose

== Solo & Group Exhibitions ==
- 2008 “THE SIX 2008”, Hillside Terrace, Tokyo
- 2009 “SLOGAN”, Ota Fine Arts, Tokyo2010 “G-tokyo2010” (art fair), Mori Arts Center Gallery, Tokyo
- 2010 “Season of Incubation 2”, Ota Fine Arts, Tokyo
- 2010 “KIAF 2010”COEX, Korea2011 “Melancholia”, Ota Fine Arts, Tokyo
- 2012 “G-tokyo2012 - αExhibition” (art fair), Mori Arts Center Gallery, Tokyo
- 2012 “Waik in Asia”, Ota Fine Arts, Tokyo
- 2013 “Imago Mundi”, Fondazione Querini Stampalia, Italy
- 2013 “Drawings”, Gallery SIDE2, Tokyo
- 2015 “ARBITRARY DREAM”, Lacey Contemporary Gallery, London
- 2015 “That's all they did tomorrow But you finished yesterday”, Pjazza Teatru Rjal Valletta, Malta
- 2015 “ROMANCING ABSTRACTION”, The Fitzrovia Gallery, London
- 2016 “Contemporary Art Exhibition ‘On the Threshold II: Formal Presence’”, Oriental Museum, Durham University Durham The UK
- 2016 “Crystal and landscape”, HARMAS GALLERY, Tokyo
- 2016 “Contemporary city scape”, Roppongi hills AD gallery, Tokyo
- 2016 “The Art of Humanity at The Pratt Institute”, PRATT INSTITUTE THE RUBELLE AND NORMAN SCHFLER GALLERY, New York
- 2016 “Shin Moroism 4”, 798 Art district and BTAP, Beijing China
- 2016 “The entity of truth”, Lily Agius Gallery, Sliema, Malta
- 2018 “FBA Art Futures”, Mall Gallery London, London
- 2018 “DOMANI 20th”, National Art Center Tokyo, Tokyo
- 2018 “Yoshino Gypsum Art Foundation Grant Recipients FORMS AWAKENING”, Spiral Garden, Tokyo
- 2019 “Verticality”, Rosenfeld Porcini Gallery, London
- 2019 “Blue”, THE CLUB, Tokyo
- 2019 “TAKAHASHI COLLECTION Home of Art”, Tsuruoka Art Forum, Yamagata
- 2020 “Romantic Depression”, THE CLUB, Tokyo
- 2020 "TIMELESSNESS", THE CLUB, Tokyo
- 2021 “ The landscape: from the exterior to the interior”, Rosenfeld Gallery, London
- 2021 “Vacation on the Blue”, THE CLUB, Tokyo
- 2021 “Yoshino Gypsum collection show technicolors Vol.1”, Omotesando hills space O, Tokyo
- 2022 “Horizon Dream of Color”, LIGHTWELL, Taiwan
- 2022 “The Utopia Chapter 6”, THE CLUB, Tokyo
- 2022 “Under Current“, Powerlong Museum, Shanghai
- 2024 “APOCALYPSE NOW,” TRISTAN HOARE GALLERY, London
- 2025 “Metronome,”YIRI ARTS, Taiwan
- 2025 “Unlimited Message,”Kyoto TSUTAYA, Kyoto

=== Art fair ===
- 2010 “G-tokyo2010” (art fair), Mori Arts Center Gallery, Tokyo
- 2010 “KIAF 2010”COEX, Korea
- 2012 “G-tokyo2012 - αExhibition” (art fair), Mori Arts Center Gallery, Tokyo
- 2012 “ARTHK12”, Hong Kong Convention &Exhibition Centre (HKCEC) Hall1, Hong Kong
- 2012 “Abu Dhabi Art2012”, Saadiyat Cultural District, Abu Dhabi, U.A.E
- 2014 “Daegu Art fair 2014”, EXCO, Korea
- 2015 “3331 Art Fair -Various Collectors”, 3331 Arts Chiyoda, Tokyo
- 2016 “3331 Art Fair -Various Collectors”, 3331 Arts Chiyoda, Tokyo
- 2017 “Art stage Singapore 2017”, Marina Bay Sands, Sands Expo & Convention Center, Singapore
- 2017 “Malta Art Fair 2017”, MFCC Malta Fairs and Convention Center, Malta

=== Museum ===
- 2010 “Takamatsu Contemporary Art Annual vol.1”, Takamatsu City Museum of Art, Kagawa
- 2016 “Contemporary Art Exhibition ‘On the Threshold II: Formal Presence’”, Oriental Museum, Durham University Durham The UK
- 2018 “DOMANI 20th”, National Art Center Tokyo, Tokyo
- 2019 “The Post Anthropocene”, DAIWA Foundation, London
- 2022 “Under Current“, Powerlong Museum, Shanghai
- 2022 “Coming & Going,” Mori Art Museum, Tokyo
- 2023 “The Everyday Interrupted,” Yu-Hsiu Museum of Art, Taiwan

=== Artist Talk ===
- 2016 Omotesando Apple Store, Tokyo
- 2018 “DOMANI 20th”, National Art Center Tokyo
- 2019 Daiwa Foundation, London
- 2021 Tokyo Art University, Tokyo

=== Collaboration ===
- 2020 Discord Yohji Yamamoto x Naoya Inose Collection
- 2020 Discord Yohji Yamamoto x Naoya Inose Collection
- 2020 Hotel Shiroiya x Naoya Inose Collection
- 2021 NADiffx Naoya Inose Collection
- 2024 ZOZO TOWN x Naoya Inose Collection
- 2025 Manhattan Portage x Naoya Inose Collection

=== Grant ===
- 2008 Kume art prize
- 2012 Nomura foundation
- 2013 Yosino Gypsum Art Foundation
- 2015 - 2016 Japanese Government Overseas Research Programme for Artists

=== Collection ===
- FONDAZIONE BENETTON Collection, Italy
- Oketa Collection, Japan
- Takahashi Collection, Japan
- SEGA SAMMY Collection, Japan
- UESHIMA Collection, Japan

=== Institution of art Malta IAM ===
In an effort to support young artists in entering the commercial sphere, Naoya Inose created the Gallery and Artist Residency (IAM). Unfortunately, due to the recent global pandemic, the gallery has been temporary closed.
