= Holiday Rapid View Yamanashi =

Japanese rapid train service

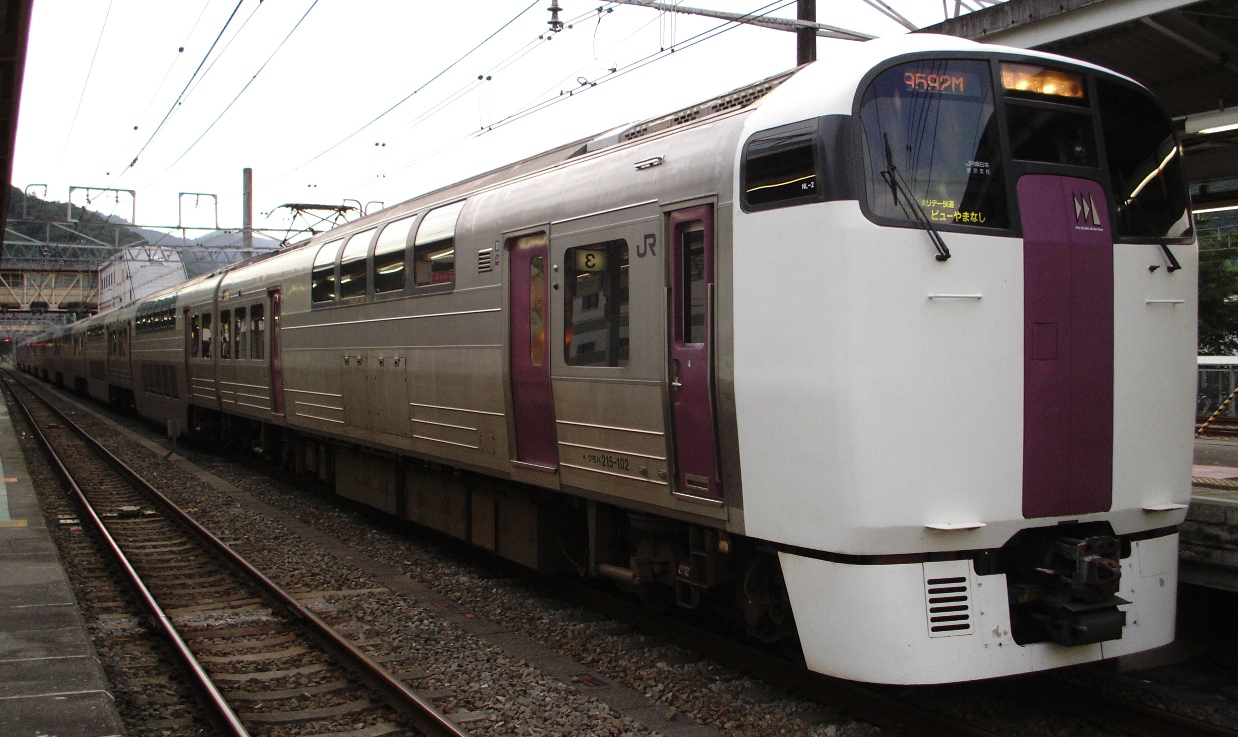
- A Holiday Rapid View Yamanashi service at Takao Station

Overview
- Service type: Rapid
- Status: Operational
- Locale: Tokyo, Kanagawa Prefecture, Yamanashi Prefecture
- First service: 1993
- Current operator(s): East Japan Railway Company (JR East)

Route
- Termini: Shinjuku; Kobuchizawa
- Line(s) used: JR East: Chūō Main Line

On-board services
- Class(es): Standard class, Green Car

Technical
- Rolling stock: JR East 215 series EMUs (From Kōzu Depot)
- Track gauge: 1,067 mm (3 ft 6 in)
- Electrification: 1,500 V DC overhead
- Operating speed: 100 km/h (62 mph) max.

The Holiday Rapid View Yamanashi (ホリデー快速ビューやまなし) is a Holiday Rapid service train operated by East Japan Railway Company from Shinjuku to Kobuchizawa on the Chūō Main Line.

== Service pattern ==
- 1 round trip is operated every weekend from March to November.
- Services are not operated from December to February, to prevent train failures due to the winter season, as the rolling stock, the 215 series, is not designed to withstand low temperatures and snow.

== Stations served ==
- Shinjuku - Mitaka - Tachikawa - Hachiōji - Takao - Sagamiko - Ōtsuki - Katsunuma-Budōkyō - Enzan - Yamanashi-shi - Isawa-Onsen - Kōfu - Nirasaki - Kobuchizawa
  - The train skips Nakano and Kokubunji, where the Holiday Rapid Okutama & Akigawa would stop.
  - There are days when the train makes additional stops at Uenohara, Kai-Yamato, Shiozaki, Anayama, etc.
  - Westbound trains to Kobuchizawa makes two brief stops (no boarding or alighting) at Torisawa and Hinoharu, to let limited express trains overtake the train.
  - Eastbound trains to Shinjuku makes a brief stop (no boarding or alighting) at Kai-Yamato, to let a limited express train to overtake the train.
  - Extended services to Chiba makes additional stops after Shinjuku, which are Kinshichō - Ichikawa - Funabashi - Tsudanuma - Chiba

== Ticketing ==
There are 3 types of seating for this train, namely Non-reserved seating (自由席), Reserved seating (指定席) and Green Seating (グリーン席), which require different tickets.

For non-reserved seating, only a Basic Fare Ticket (乗車券) is required. This is different from non-reserved seating on Limited Expresses, as this train is only a Rapid service, which makes the purchase of a Non-reserved Limited Express Ticket (自由席特急券) unnecessary.

For reserved seating, a Seat Reservation Ticket (座席指定券) costing 520 yen is required, along with the Basic Fare Ticket.

For Green seating, a Green Car Ticket (グリーン券) is required, with pricing depending on distance, along with the Basic Fare Ticket.

== Rolling stock ==
- 215 series 10-car sets (based at Kōzu Depot)

Car No.	1	2	3	4	5	6	7	8	9	10
Accommodation	Non-reserved	Non-reserved	Non-reserved	Green	Green	Reserved	Reserved	Non-reserved	Non-reserved	Non-reserved
Numbering	KuMoHa 215	MoHa 214	SaHa 215-200	SaRo 214	SaRo 215	SaHa 214	SaHa 214	SaHa 215-100	MoHa 214-100	KuMoHa 215-100

- Car 1 is at the Kobuchizawa end, and Car 10 is at the Shinjuku end. This is the opposite to other trains on the Chūō Main Line.

== History ==
- 1993: Services between Tokyo and Kobuchizawa began.
- 2002: With the introduction of 215 series to the Shonan-Shinjuku Line, the eastern terminus is changed from Tokyo to Shinjuku.
- 2007: Extended services to Chiba on particular days began operation.

== See also ==
- List of named passenger trains of Japan
- Holiday Rapid Okutama & Akigawa, another Holiday Rapid service on the Chūō Line.
