= Tanokura Station =

Railway station in Tsuru, Yamanashi Prefecture, Japan

Tanokura Station 田野倉駅
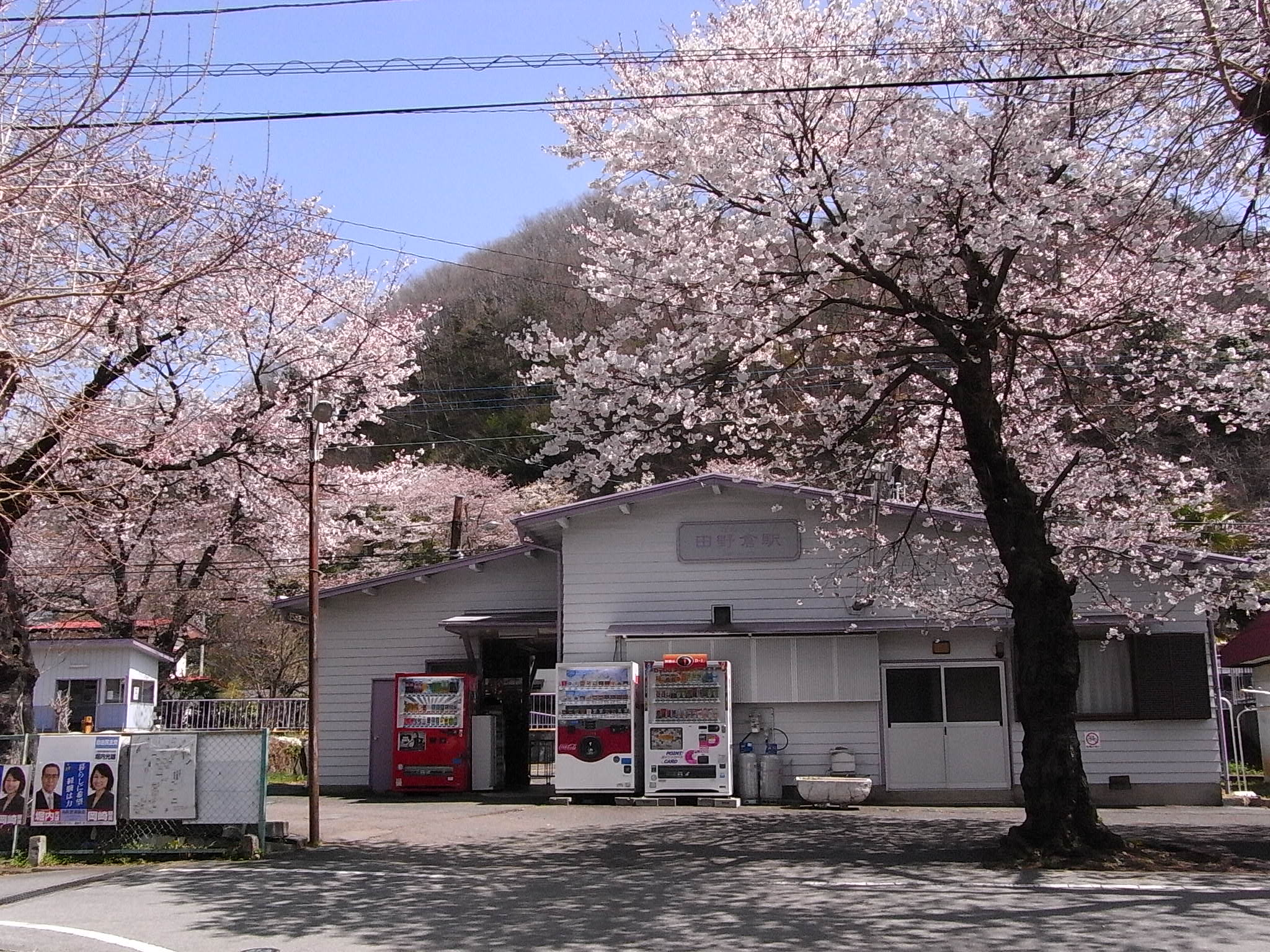
- Tanokura Station, April 2009

General information
- Location: 771 Tanokura, Tsuru-shi, Yamanashi-ken; Japan
- Coordinates: 35°35′35″N 138°55′52″E
- Elevation: 710 m (2,330 ft)
- Operator: Fuji Kyuko
- Line: ■ Fujikyuko Line
- Distance: 3.0 km from Ōtsuki
- Platforms: 2 side platforms
- Tracks: 2

Other information
- Status: Unstaffed
- Station code: FJ03
- Website: Official website

History
- Opened: 19 June 1929

Passengers
- FY2013: 628 daily
Location
- Location within Yamanashi Prefecture Location within Japan

Tanokura Station (田野倉駅, Tanokura-eki) is a railway station on the Fujikyuko Line in the city of Tsuru, Yamanashi, Japan, operated by Fuji Kyuko (Fujikyu).

== Lines ==
Tanokura Station is served by the 26.6 km (16.5 mi) privately operated Fujikyuko Line from Ōtsuki to Kawaguchiko, and lies 3.0 kilometres (1.9 mi) from the terminus of the line at Ōtsuki Station.

== Station layout ==
The station is staffed and consists of two side platforms serving two tracks. Passengers cross the tracks between the platforms via a level crossing. It has a waiting room and toilet facilities.

== Adjacent stations ==
«	Service	»
Fujikyuko Line
Kamiōtsuki	Local	Kasei
Fujisan Tokkyū: Does not stop at this station
Fuji Tozan Densha: Does not stop at this station

== History ==
Tanokura Station opened on 19 June 1929.

== Passenger statistics ==
In fiscal 1998, the station was used by an average of 752 passengers daily.

== Surrounding area ==
- Mount Kuki

== See also ==
- List of railway stations in Japan
