= Shiotsu Station =

Railway station in Uenohara, Yamanashi Prefecture, Japan

JC28 Shiotsu Station 四方津駅
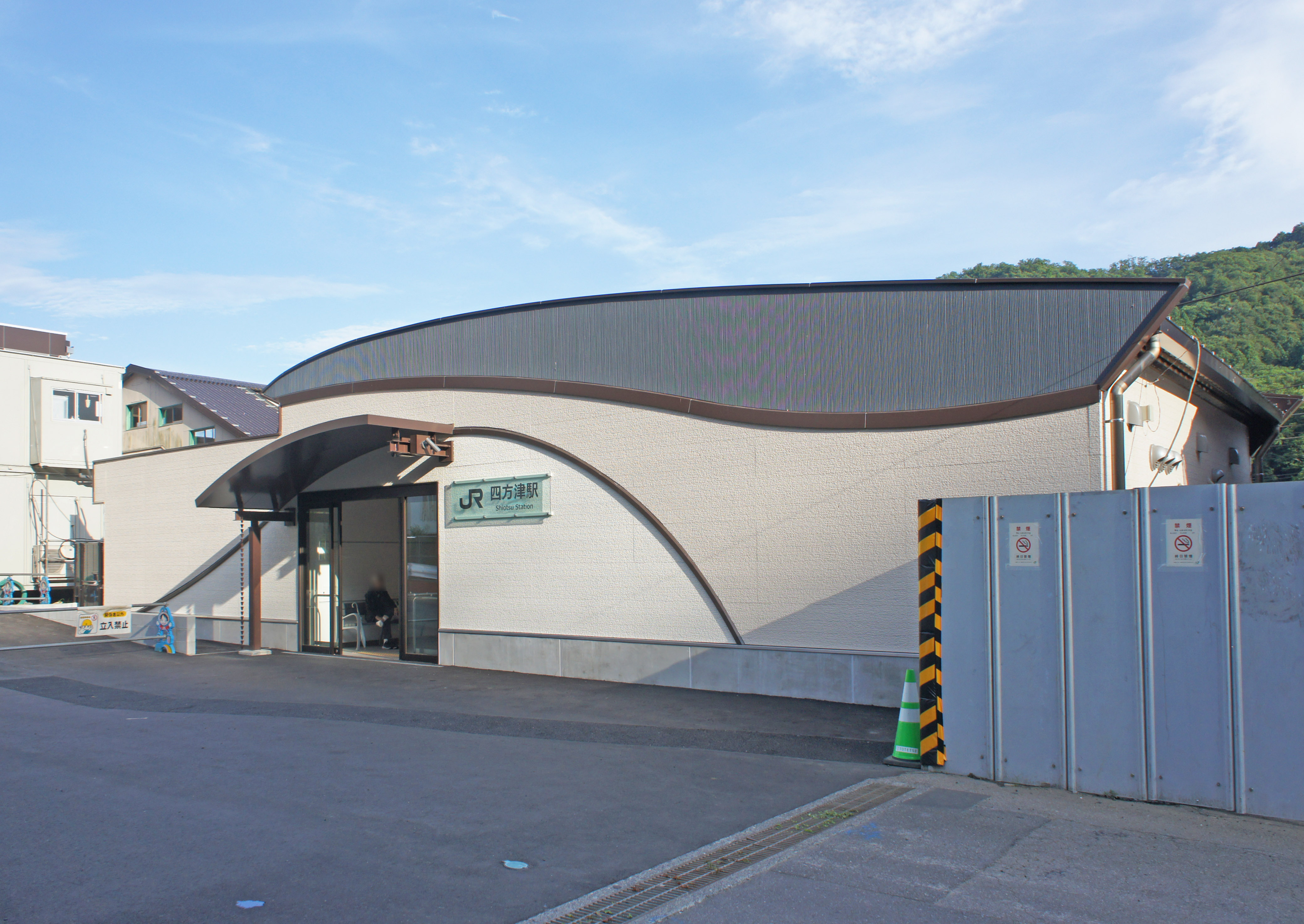
- The station building in July 2022

General information
- Location: 1981 Shiotsu, Uenohara-shi, Yamanashi-ken; Japan
- Coordinates: 35.6142°N 139.0726°E
- Operator: JR East
- Line: ■ Chūō Main Line
- Distance: 74.0 km from Tokyo
- Platforms: 1 side + 1 island platforms
- Tracks: 3

Other information
- Status: Staffed
- Website: Official website

History
- Opened: December 15, 1910

Passengers
- FY2024: 2,514 (daily) ▼1.48%

Services
Preceding station	JR East	Following station
Yanagawa One-way operation	Chūō Line Commuter Special Rapid	Uenohara JC27 towards Tokyo
Yanagawa JC29 towards Ōtsuki	Chūō Line Chūō Special Rapid	Uenohara JC27 towards Tokyo
Yanagawa JC29 towards Ōtsuki	Chūō Line Commuter Rapid	Uenohara One-way operation
Yanagawa JC29 towards Ōtsuki	Chūō Line Rapid	Uenohara JC27 towards Tokyo
Yanagawa JC29 towards Shiojiri	Chūō Main Line Local	Uenohara JC27 towards Tachikawa
Location
- Location within Yamanashi Prefecture Location within Japan

Shiotsu Station (四方津駅, Shiotsu-eki) is a railway station of the Chūō Main Line, East Japan Railway Company (JR East) in the city of Uenohara, Yamanashi Prefecture, Japan.

== Lines ==
Shiotsu Station is served by the Chūō Rapid Line / Chūō Main Line, and is 74.0 kilometers from the terminus of the line at Tokyo Station.

== Station layout ==
The station has a single island platform and a single side platform serving three tracks, connected to the station building by a footbridge. The station is staffed.

=== Platforms ===
1	■ Chūō Main Line	For Takao, Tachikawa, Shinjuku
2	■ Chūō Main Line	auxiliary platform
3	■ Chūō Main Line	For Ōtsuki , Kōfu

== Station history ==
Shiotsu Station first opened on December 15, 1910, as a station for both freight and passenger service on the Japanese Government Railways (JGR) Chūō Main Line. The JGC became the JNR after the end of World War II. With the dissolution and privatization of the JNR on April 1, 1987, the station came under the control of the East Japan Railway Company. Automated turnstiles using the Suica IC Card system came into operation from November 18, 2001.

== Passenger statistics ==
In fiscal 2017, the station was used by an average of 1641 passengers daily (boarding passengers only).

== Surrounding area ==
- Shiotsu Elementary School
- Japan National Route 20

== See also ==
- List of railway stations in Japan
