= Sasago Station =

Railway station in Ōtsuki, Yamanashi Prefecture, Japan

CO34 Sasago Station 笹子駅
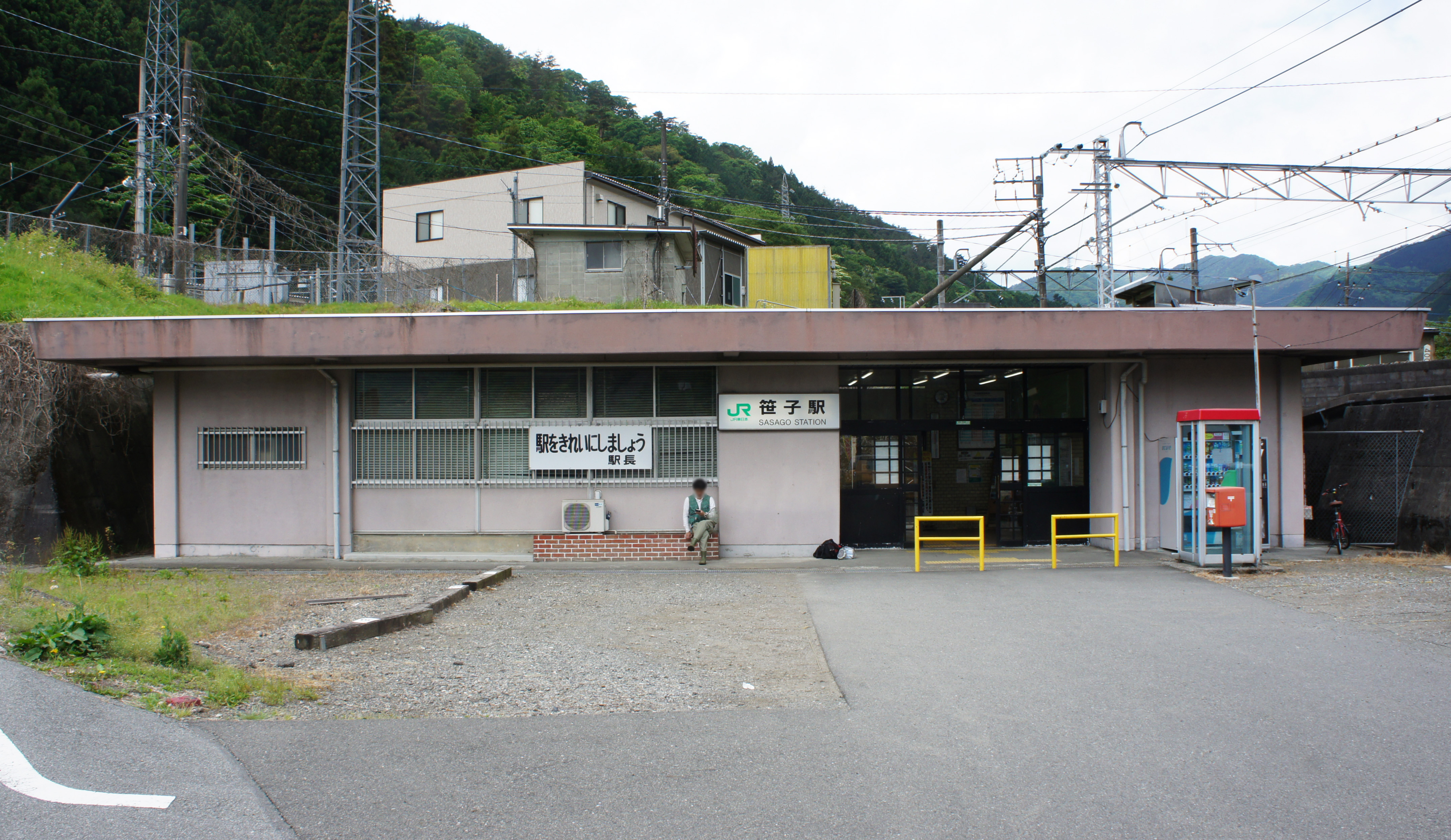
- Sasago Station in May 2021

General information
- Location: 1340, Sasago-machi Kuronoda, Ōtsuki-shi, Yamanashi-ken; Japan
- Coordinates: 35°36′15″N 138°49′37″E
- Operator: JR East
- Line: ■ Chūō Main Line
- Distance: 100.4 km from Tokyo
- Platforms: 1 island platform
- Tracks: 2

Other information
- Status: Unstaffed
- Website: Official website

History
- Opened: February 1, 1903

Passengers
- 2010: 141 daily

Services
Preceding station	JR East	Following station
Kai-Yamato CO35 towards Shiojiri	Chūō Main Line Local	Hatsukari CO33 towards Tachikawa
Location
- Location within Yamanashi Prefecture Location within Japan

Sasago Station (笹子駅, Sasago-eki) is a railway station on the Chūō Main Line, East Japan Railway Company (JR East) in Sasago-Kuronoda, in the city of Ōtsuki, Yamanashi Prefecture, Japan.

== Lines ==
Sasago Station is served by the Chūō Main Line and is 100.4 kilometers from the terminus of the line at Tokyo Station.

== Station layout ==
The station has a single island platform connected to the station building by an underpass. The station is unattended.

=== Platforms ===
1	■ Chūō Main Line	For Kōfu, Kobuchizawa and Matsumoto
2	■ Chūō Main Line	For Ōtsuki , Kōfu

== History ==
Sasago Station was opened on February 1, 1903 as station on the Japanese Government Railways (JGR) Chūō Main Line. The JGR became the JNR (Japanese National Railways) after the end of World War II. The station has been unattended since March 1985. With the dissolution and privatization of the JNR on April 1, 1987, the station came under the control of the East Japan Railway Company. Automated turnstiles using the Suica IC Card system came into operation from October 16, 2004.

== Passenger statistics ==
In fiscal 2010, the station was used by an average of 142 passengers daily (boarding passengers only).

== Surrounding area ==
- former Sasago village hall

== See also ==
- List of railway stations in Japan
