= Yanagawa Station =

Yanagawa Station is the name of three train stations in Japan:

- Yanagawa Station (Fukushima)
- Yanagawa Station (Okayama)
- Yanagawa Station (Yamanashi)
