= Fujino Station =

Railway station in Sagamihara, Kanagawa Prefecture, Japan

JC26 Fujino Station 藤野駅
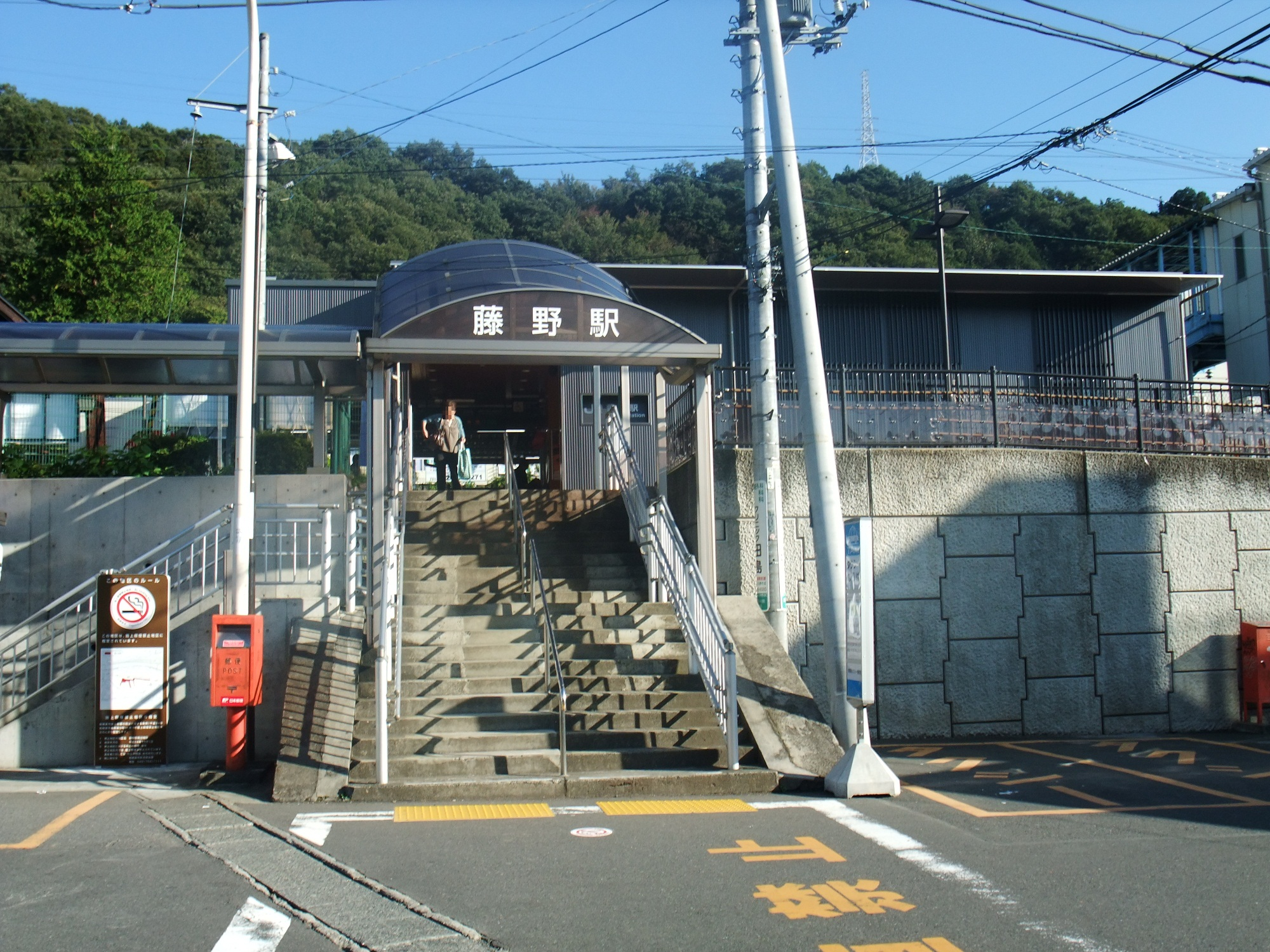
- Exit of Fujino Station, October 2012

General information
- Location: 1698 Obuchi, Midori-ku, Sagamihara-shi, Kanagawa-ken 252-0184; Japan
- Coordinates: 35.6160°N 139.1524°E
- Operator: JR East
- Line: ■ Chūō Main Line
- Distance: 66.2 km from Tokyo
- Platforms: 1 island platform
- Connections: Bus terminal

Other information
- Status: Staffed
- Station code: JC26
- Website: Official website

History
- Opened: July 15, 1901

Passengers
- FY2024: 3,488 (daily) ▼0.85%

Services
Preceding station	JR East	Following station
Uenohara One-way operation	Chūō Line Commuter Special Rapid	Sagamiko JC25 towards Tokyo
Uenohara JC27 towards Ōtsuki	Chūō Line Chūō Special Rapid	Sagamiko JC25 towards Tokyo
Uenohara JC27 towards Ōtsuki	Chūō Line Commuter Rapid	Sagamiko One-way operation
Uenohara JC27 towards Ōtsuki	Chūō Line Rapid	Sagamiko JC25 towards Tokyo
Uenohara JC27 towards Shiojiri	Chūō Main Line Local	Sagamiko JC25 towards Tachikawa
Location
- Location within Kanagawa Prefecture Location within Japan

Fujino Station (藤野駅, Fujino-eki) is a passenger railway station located in Midori-ku in the city of Sagamihara, Kanagawa Prefecture, Japan, and is operated by the East Japan Railway Company (JR East).

== Lines ==
Fujino Station is served by the Chūō Rapid Line / Chūō Main Line, and is located 66.3 kilometers from the terminus of the line at Tokyo.

== Station layout ==
The station consists of a single island platform serving two tracks, connected to the station building by a footbridge. The station is staffed

=== Platforms ===
1	Chūō Main Line	for Ōtsuki, Kōfu, Yokohama
2	Chūō Main Line	for Tachikawa, Shinjuku, and Tokyo

== History ==
Fujino Station first opened on July 15, 1901, as a passenger station on the Japanese Government Railways (JGR) Chūō Line. The JGR became the JNR after the end of World War II. With the dissolution and privatization of the JNR on April 1, 1987, the station came under the control of the East Japan Railway Company. Automated turnstiles using the Suica IC Card system came into operation from November 18, 2001.

== Passenger statistics ==
In fiscal 2019, the station was used by an average of 2,151 passengers daily (boarding passengers only).

The passenger figures (boarding passengers only) for previous years are as shown below.

Fiscal year	daily average
2005	3,007
2010	2,775
2015	2,538

== Surrounding area ==
- former Fujino Town Hall
- Lake Sagami

== See also ==
- List of railway stations in Japan
