= Kamiōtsuki Station =

Railway station in Ōtsuki, Yamanashi Prefecture, Japan

Kamiōtsuki Station 上大月駅
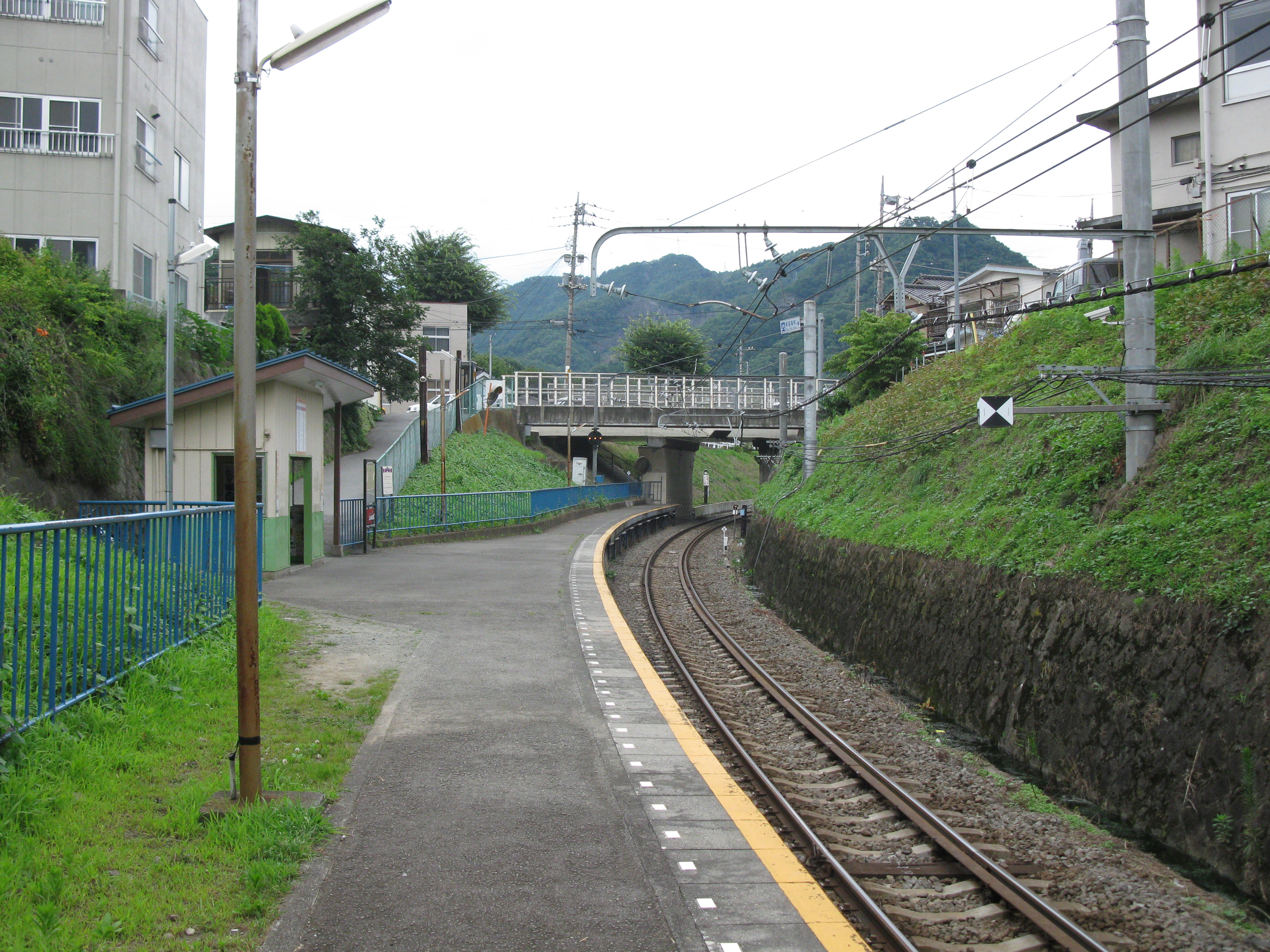
- View of the platform, July 2009

General information
- Location: 2-223-3 Ōtsuki, Ōtsuki-shi, Yamanashi-ken; Japan
- Coordinates: 35°36′33″N 138°56′17″E
- Elevation: 520 m (1,710 ft)
- Operator: Fuji Kyuko
- Line: ■ Fujikyuko Line
- Distance: 0.6 km from Ōtsuki
- Platforms: 1 side platform
- Tracks: 1

Other information
- Status: Unstaffed
- Station code: FJ02
- Website: Official website

History
- Opened: 19 June 1929

Passengers
- FY2014: 95 daily
Location
- Location within Yamanashi Prefecture Location within Japan

Kamiōtsuki Station (上大月駅, Kamiōtsuki-eki) is a railway station on the Fujikyuko Line in the city of Ōtsuki, Yamanashi, Japan, operated by Fuji Kyuko (Fujikyu).

== Lines ==
Kamiōtsuki Station is served by the 26.6 km (16.5 mi) privately operated Fujikyuko Line from Ōtsuki to Kawaguchiko, and lies 0.6 kilometres (0.37 mi) from the terminus of the line at Ōtsuki Station.

== Station layout ==
The station is unstaffed, and consists of a single side platform serving a single bidirectional track. The station structure consists of a simple waiting room with no other facilities.

== Adjacent stations ==
«	Service	»
Fujikyuko Line
Ōtsuki JC32	Local	Tanokura
Fujisan Tokkyū: Does not stop at this station
Fuji Tozan Densha: Does not stop at this station

== History ==
Kamiōtsuki Station opened on 19 June 1929 as Ōtsukibashi Station (大月橋駅). It was renamed Kamiōtsuki in 1934.

== Passenger statistics ==
In fiscal 1998, the station was used by an average of 74 passengers daily.

== Surrounding area ==
- Tsuru High School
- Ōtsuki Municipal Hospital
- National Route 20

== See also ==
- List of railway stations in Japan
