= Hatsukari Station =

Railway station in Ōtsuki, Yamanashi Prefecture, Japan

CO33 Hatsukari Station 初狩駅
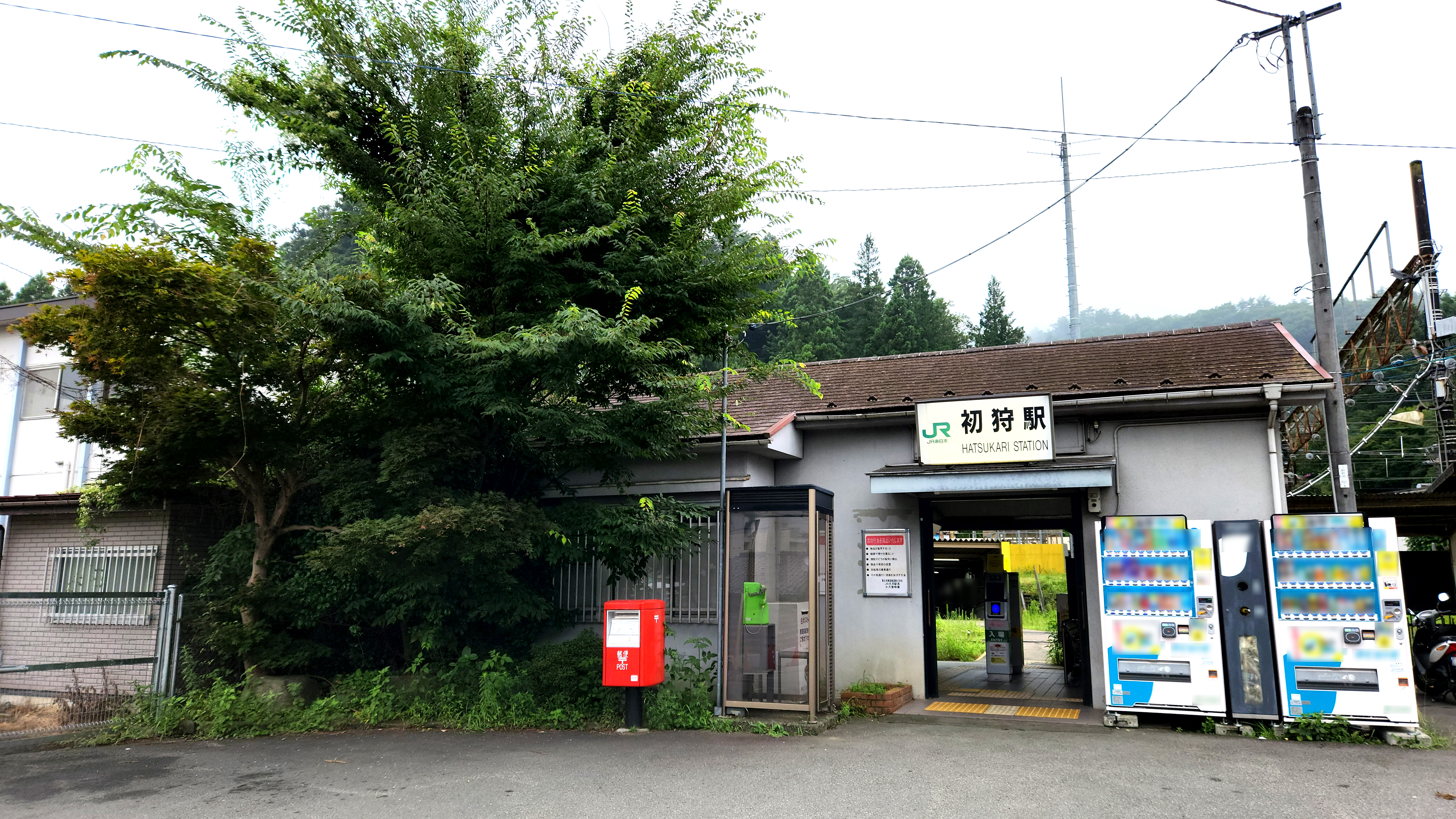
- The station building in August 2022

General information
- Location: 3390, Hatsukari-machi Shimohatsukari, Ōtsuki-shi, Yamanashi-ken; Japan
- Coordinates: 35°35′41″N 138°53′04″E
- Operator: East Japan Railway Company; Japan Freight Railway Company
- Line: ■ Chūō Main Line
- Distance: 93.9 km from Tokyo
- Platforms: 1 island platform
- Tracks: 2

Other information
- Status: Unstaffed
- Website: Official website

History
- Opened: February 10, 1910

Passengers
- 2012: 393 daily

Services
Preceding station	JR East	Following station
Sasago CO34 towards Shiojiri	Chūō Main Line Local	Ōtsuki JC32 towards Tachikawa
Location
- Location within Yamanashi Prefecture Location within Japan

Hatsukari Station (初狩駅, Hatsukari-eki) is a railway station of the Chūō Main Line, East Japan Railway Company (JR East) in Hatsukari-Shimohatsukari, in the city of Ōtsuki, Yamanashi Prefecture, Japan. The station also has a freight terminal operated by the Japan Freight Railway Company.

== Lines ==
Hatsukari Station is served by the Chūō Main Line, and is 93.9 kilometers from the terminus of the line at Tokyo Station.

== Station layout ==
The station consists of one ground level island platform, connected to the station building by a level crossing. The station is unattended.

=== Platforms ===
1	■ Chūō Main Line	for Ōtsuki, Takao, Hachiōji and Tachikawa
2, 3	■ Chūō Main Line	for Kōfu, Kami-Suwa and Matsumoto

== Station history ==
Hatsukari Station was opened on July 9, 1908 as a signal stop on the Japanese Government Railways (JGR) Chūō Main Line. It was elevated to a full station for passenger and freight services on February 10, 1910. The JGR became the JNR (Japanese National Railways) after the end of World War II. The current station building was completed in October 1951. With the dissolution and privatization of the JNR on April 1, 1987, the station came under the control of the East Japan Railway Company. Automated turnstiles using the Suica IC Card system came into operation from October 16, 2004.

== Passenger statistics ==
In fiscal 2012, the station was used by an average of 393 passengers daily (boarding passengers only).

== Surrounding area ==
- former Hatsukari village hall

== See also ==
- List of railway stations in Japan
