= Torisawa Station =

Railway station in Ōtsuki, Yamanashi Prefecture, Japan

JC30 Torisawa Station 鳥沢駅
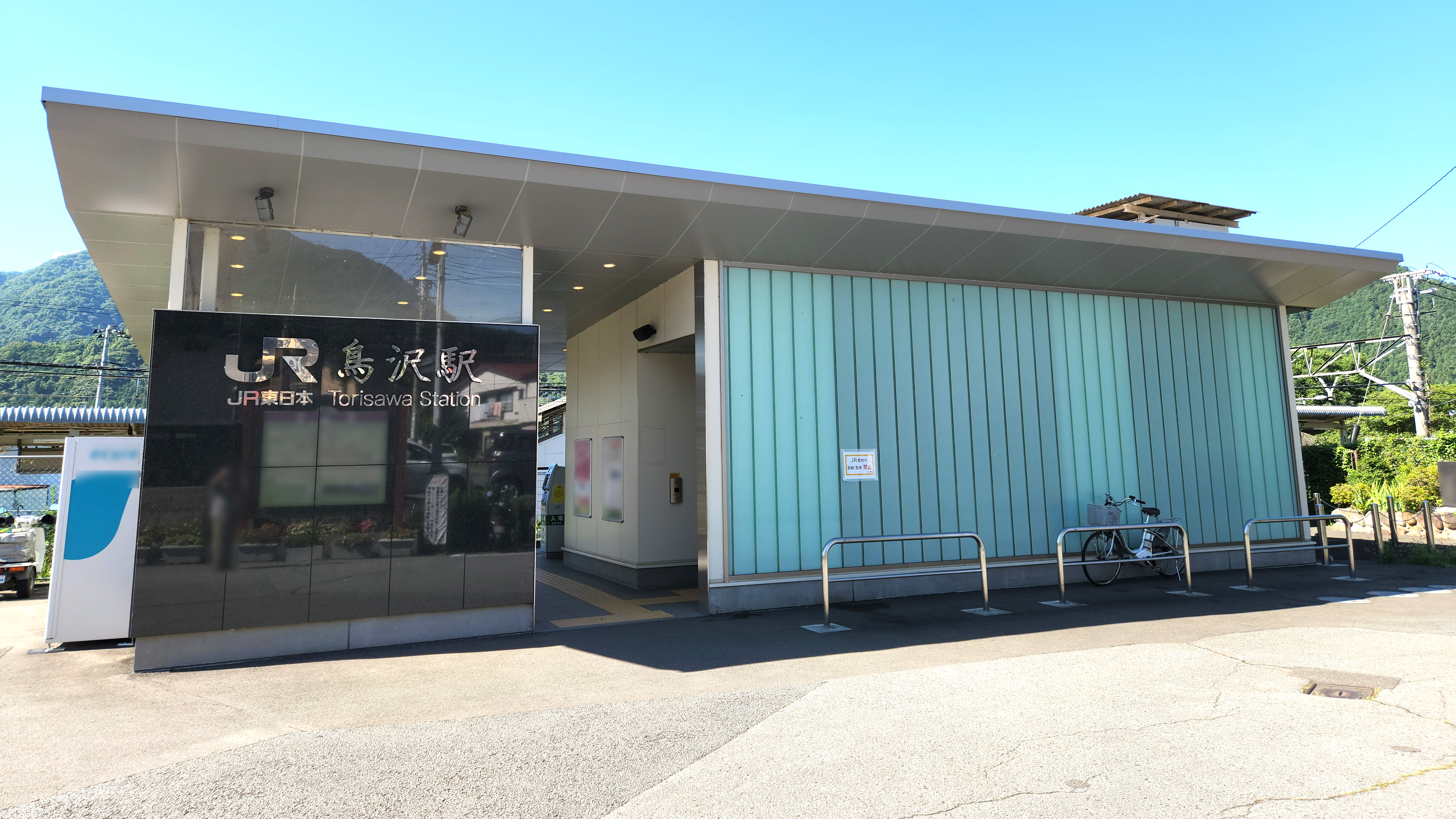
- The station building in July 2022

General information
- Location: 319-2 Torisawa, Tomihama-machi, Ōtsuki-shi, Yamanashi-ken; Japan
- Coordinates: 35.6079°N 139.0031°E
- Operator: JR East
- Line: ■ Chūō Main Line
- Distance: 81.2 km from Tokyo
- Platforms: 1 island platform
- Tracks: 2

Other information
- Status: Unstaffed
- Website: Official website

History
- Opened: June 1, 1902

Passengers
- 2014: 871 daily

Services
Preceding station	JR East	Following station
Saruhashi One-way operation	Chūō Line Commuter Special Rapid	Yanagawa JC29 towards Tokyo
Saruhashi JC31 towards Ōtsuki	Chūō Line Chūō Special Rapid	Yanagawa JC29 towards Tokyo
Saruhashi JC31 towards Ōtsuki	Chūō Line Commuter Rapid	Yanagawa One-way operation
Saruhashi JC31 towards Ōtsuki	Chūō Line Rapid	Yanagawa JC29 towards Tokyo
Saruhashi JC31 towards Shiojiri	Chūō Main Line Local	Yanagawa JC29 towards Tachikawa
Location
- Location within Yamanashi Prefecture Location within Japan

Torisawa Station (鳥沢駅, Torisawa-eki) is a railway station of the Chūō Main Line, East Japan Railway Company (JR East) in the city of Ōtsuki, Yamanashi, Japan.

== Lines ==
Torisawa Station is served by the Chūō Main Line / Chūō Rapid Line, and is 81.2 kilometers from the terminus of the line at Tokyo Station.

== Station layout ==
The station consists of one ground level island platform, connected to the station building by a footbridge. The station is unattended.

=== Platforms ===
1	■ Chūō Main Line	for Ōtsuki and Kōfu
2, 3	■ Chūō Main Line	for Takao, Tachikawa, and Shinjuku

== History ==
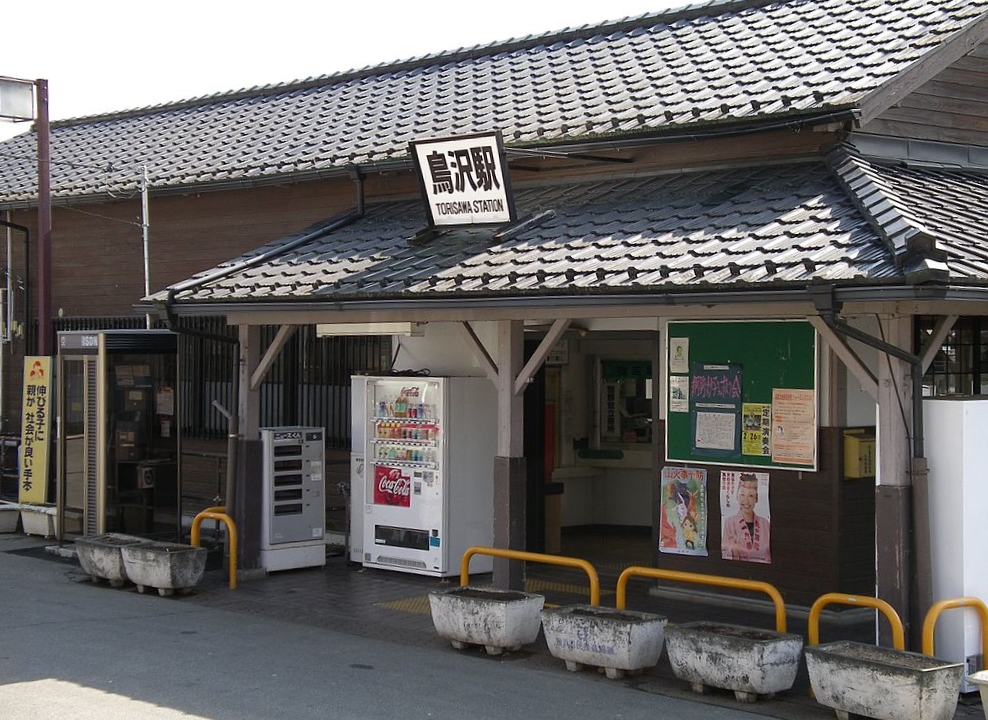
The station in February 2006, before rebuilding

Torisawa Station opened on June 1, 1902, as a passenger and freight station on the Japanese National Railways (JNR) Chūō Main Line. With the dissolution and privatization of the JNR on April 1, 1987, the station came under the control of the East Japan Railway Company.

== Passenger statistics ==
In fiscal 2014, the station was used by an average of 871 passengers daily (boarding passengers only).

== Surrounding area ==
- Torizawa-juku on the old Koshu-kaido

== See also ==
- List of railway stations in Japan
