= Uenohara Station =

Railway station in Uenohara, Yamanashi Prefecture, Japan

JC27 Uenohara Station 上野原駅
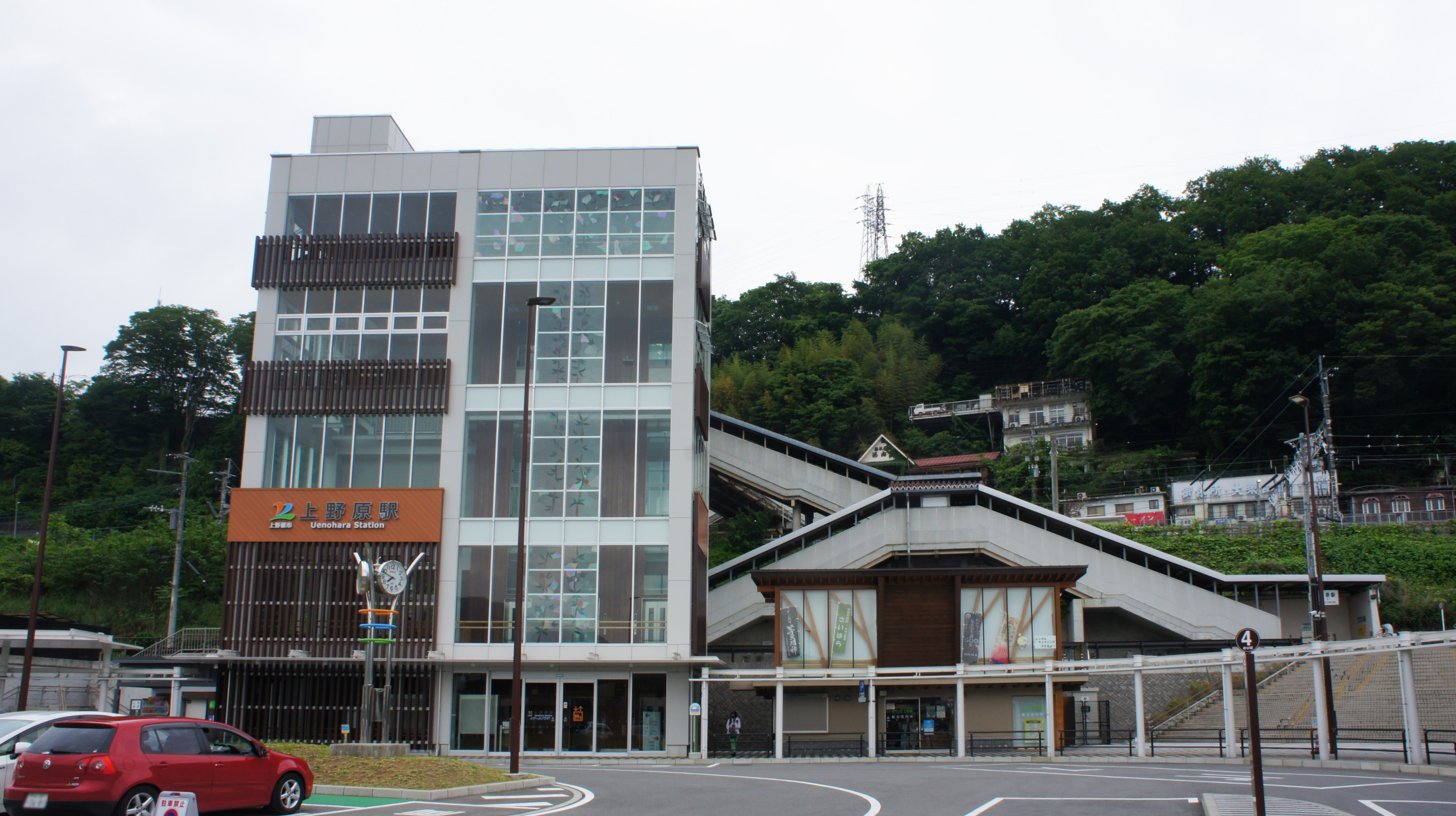
- South Exit of the Station in May 2021

General information
- Location: 1025 Arata, Uenohara-shi, Yamanashi-ken; Japan
- Coordinates: 35.6188°N 139.1162°E
- Operator: JR East
- Line: ■ Chūō Main Line
- Distance: 69.8 km from Tokyo
- Platforms: 1 island platform
- Tracks: 2

Other information
- Status: Staffed
- Website: Official website

History
- Opened: August 1, 1901

Passengers
- FY2024: 8,240 (daily) ▼1.24%

Services
Preceding station	JR East	Following station
Shiotsu One-way operation	Chūō Line Commuter Special Rapid	Fujino JC26 towards Tokyo
Shiotsu JC28 towards Ōtsuki	Chūō Line Chūō Special Rapid	Fujino JC26 towards Tokyo
Shiotsu JC28 towards Ōtsuki	Chūō Line Commuter Rapid	Fujino One-way operation
Shiotsu JC28 towards Ōtsuki	Chūō Line Rapid	Fujino JC26 towards Tokyo
Shiotsu JC28 towards Shiojiri	Chūō Main Line Local	Fujino JC26 towards Tachikawa
Location
- Location within Yamanashi Prefecture Location within Japan

Uenohara Station (上野原駅, Uenohara-eki) is a railway station of the Chūō Main Line, East Japan Railway Company (JR East) in the city of Uenohara, Yamanashi Prefecture, Japan.

== Lines ==
Uenohara Station is served by the Chūō Line (Rapid) / Chūō Main Line, and is 69.8 kilometers from the terminus of the line at Tokyo Station.

== Station layout ==
The station has a single island platform serving two tracks, connected to the station building by a footbridge. The station is staffed.

=== Platforms ===
1	■ Chūō Main Line	For Takao, Tachikawa, Shinjuku
2	■ Chūō Main Line	For Ōtsuki , Kōfu

== Station history ==
Uenohara Station first opened on August 1, 1901, as a station for both freight and passenger service on the Japanese Government Railways (JGR) Chūō Main Line. The JGR became the Japanese National Railways (JNR) after the end of World War II. With the dissolution and privatization of the JNR on April 1, 1987, the station came under the control of the East Japan Railway Company. Automated turnstiles using the Suica IC Card system came into operation from November 18, 2001. All express trains passed the station from March 2017. In January 2018, the Midori no Madoguchi ticket office ceased operations.

== Passenger statistics ==
In fiscal 2017, the station was used by an average of 5041 passengers daily (boarding passengers only). Uenohara is the third busiest station in Yamanashi Prefecture after Kōfu and Ōtsuki.

== Surrounding area ==
- Uenohara City Hall
- Teikyo University of Science
- Japan National Route 20

== See also ==
- List of railway stations in Japan
