= Sagamiko Station =

Railway station in Sagamihara, Kanagawa Prefecture, Japan

JC25 Sagamiko Station 相模湖駅
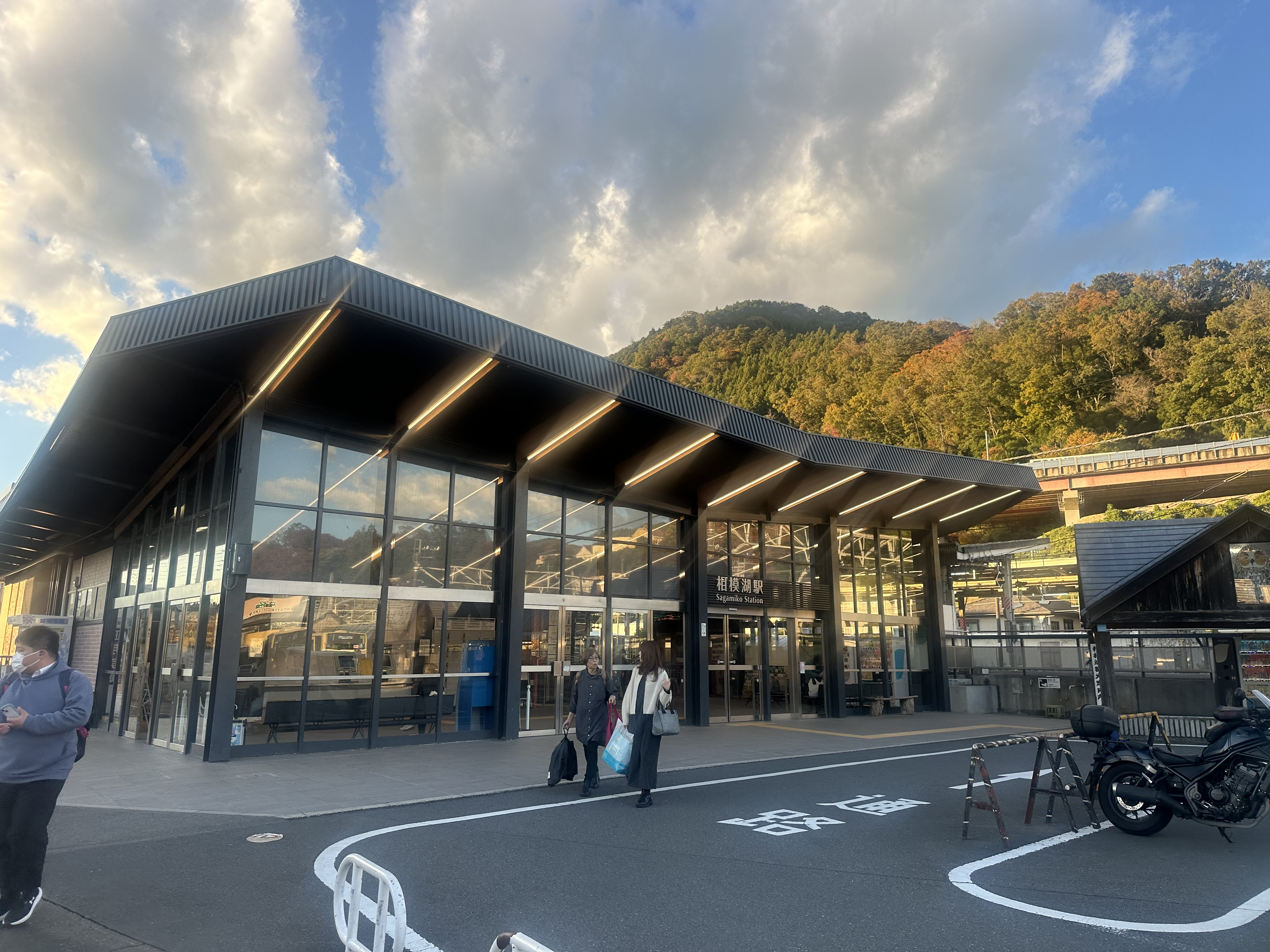
- Exit of Sagamiko Station, November 2025

General information
- Location: Yose, Midori-ku, Sagamihara-shi, Kanagawa-ken 252-0171; Japan
- Coordinates: 35.6170293°N 139.188956°E
- Operator: JR East
- Line: ■ Chūō Main Line
- Distance: 62.6 km from Tokyo
- Platforms: 1 side + 1 island platform
- Connections: Bus terminal

Other information
- Status: Staffed
- Station code: JC25
- Website: Official website

History
- Opened: August 1, 1901
- Former names: Yose (until 1956)

Passengers
- FY2024: 3,648 (daily) ▲0.05%

Services
Preceding station	JR East	Following station
Fujino One-way operation	Chūō Line Commuter Special Rapid	Takao JC24 towards Tokyo
Fujino JC26 towards Ōtsuki	Chūō Line Chūō Special Rapid	Takao JC24 towards Tokyo
Fujino JC26 towards Ōtsuki	Chūō Line Commuter Rapid	Takao One-way operation
Fujino JC26 towards Ōtsuki	Chūō Line Rapid	Takao JC24 towards Tokyo
Fujino JC26 towards Shiojiri	Chūō Main Line Local	Takao JC24 towards Tachikawa
Location
- Location within Kanagawa Prefecture Location within Japan

Sagamiko Station (相模湖駅, Sagamiko-eki) is a passenger railway station located in Midori-ku in the city of Sagamihara, Kanagawa Prefecture, Japan, and is operated by the East Japan Railway Company (JR East).

== Lines ==
Sagamiko Station is served by the Chūō Rapid Line / Chūō Main Line, and is located 62.6 kilometers from the terminus of the line at Tokyo.

== Station layout ==
The station consists of a single island platform and a side platform serving three tracks, connected to the station building by a footbridge. The middle platform (Platform 2) is used only for through traffic. The station is staffed.

=== Platforms ===
1	Chūō Main Line	for Ōtsuki, Kōfu, Matsumoto
2	Chūō Main Line	for through traffic
3	Chūō Main Line	for Takao, Shinjuku, Tokyo

== Station history ==
Sagamiko Station first opened on August 1, 1901, as Yose Station (与瀬駅, Yosei-eki) for both freight and passenger service on the Japanese Government Railways (JGR) Chūō Line. The JGR became the JNR after the end of World War II. The station was renamed to its present name on April 10, 1956. Regularly scheduled freight services were discontinued in 1971. With the dissolution and privatization of the JNR on April 1, 1987, the station came under the control of the East Japan Railway Company. Automated turnstiles using the Suica IC Card system came into operation from November 18, 2001.

== Passenger statistics ==
In fiscal 2019, the station was used by an average of 2,077 passengers daily (boarding passengers only).

The passenger figures (boarding passengers only) for previous years are as shown below.

Fiscal year	daily average
2005	3,376
2010	3,373
2015	2,442

== Surrounding area ==
- former Sagamiko Town Hall
- Sagamiko Post Office
- Lake Sagami

== See also ==
- List of railway stations in Japan
