= Yanagawa Station (Yamanashi) =

Railway station in Ōtsuki, Yamanashi Prefecture, Japan

JC29 Yanagawa Station 梁川駅
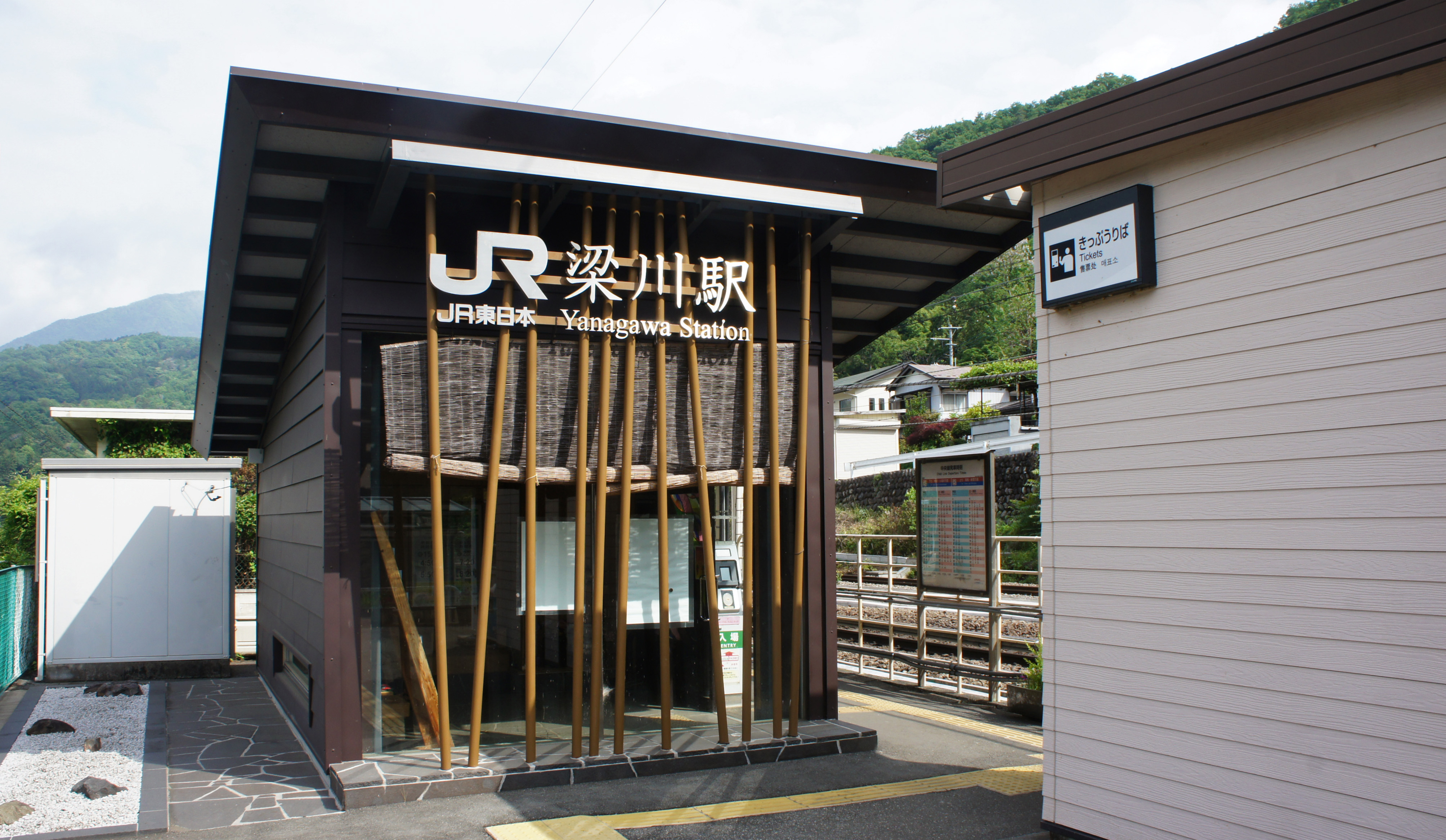
- The entrance to the station in May 2021

General information
- Location: Yanagawa-cho Tsunoe 1484, Ōtsuki-shi, Yamanashi-ken; Japan
- Coordinates: 35°36′19″N 139°02′17″E
- Operator: JR East
- Line: ■ Chūō Main Line
- Distance: 77.6 km from Tokyo
- Platforms: 1 island platform
- Tracks: 2

Other information
- Status: Unstaffed
- Website: Official website

History
- Opened: April 1, 1949

Passengers
- 2010: 227 daily

Services
Preceding station	JR East	Following station
Torisawa One-way operation	Chūō Line Commuter Special Rapid	Shiotsu JC28 towards Tokyo
Torisawa JC30 towards Ōtsuki	Chūō Line Chūō Special Rapid	Shiotsu JC28 towards Tokyo
Torisawa JC30 towards Ōtsuki	Chūō Line Commuter Rapid	Shiotsu One-way operation
Torisawa JC30 towards Ōtsuki	Chūō Line Rapid	Shiotsu JC28 towards Tokyo
Torisawa JC30 towards Shiojiri	Chūō Main Line Local	Shiotsu JC28 towards Tachikawa
Location
- Location within Yamanashi Prefecture Location within Japan

Yanagawa Station (梁川駅, Yanagawa-eki) is a railway station of the Chūō Main Line, East Japan Railway Company (JR East) in Ōtsuki, Yamanashi Prefecture, Japan.

== Lines ==
Yanagawa Station is served by the Chūō Main Line / Chūō Rapid Line, and is 77.6 kilometers from the terminus of the line at Tokyo Station.

== Station layout ==
The station consists of one ground level island platform, connected to the station building by a footbridge. The station is unattended.

=== Platforms ===
1	■ Chūō Main Line	for Ōtsuki, Kōfu and Matsumoto
2, 3	■ Chūō Main Line	for Takao, Tachikawa, Shinjuku

== Station history ==
Yanagawa Station was opened on April 1, 1949, as a passenger station on the Japanese National Railways (JNR) Chūō Main Line. It has been unattended since March 1, 1985. With the dissolution and privatization of the JNR on April 1, 1987, the station came under the control of the East Japan Railway Company. The station building was rebuilt in November 1990 in a log-cabin style after a fire destroyed the former building. Automated turnstiles using the Suica IC Card system came into operation from November 18, 2001.

== Passenger statistics ==
In fiscal 2010, the station was used by an average of 227 passengers daily (boarding passengers only).

== Surrounding area ==
- former Yanagawa village hall

== See also ==
- List of railway stations in Japan
