= Ōtsuki, Yamanashi =

Ōtsuki 大月市
- City
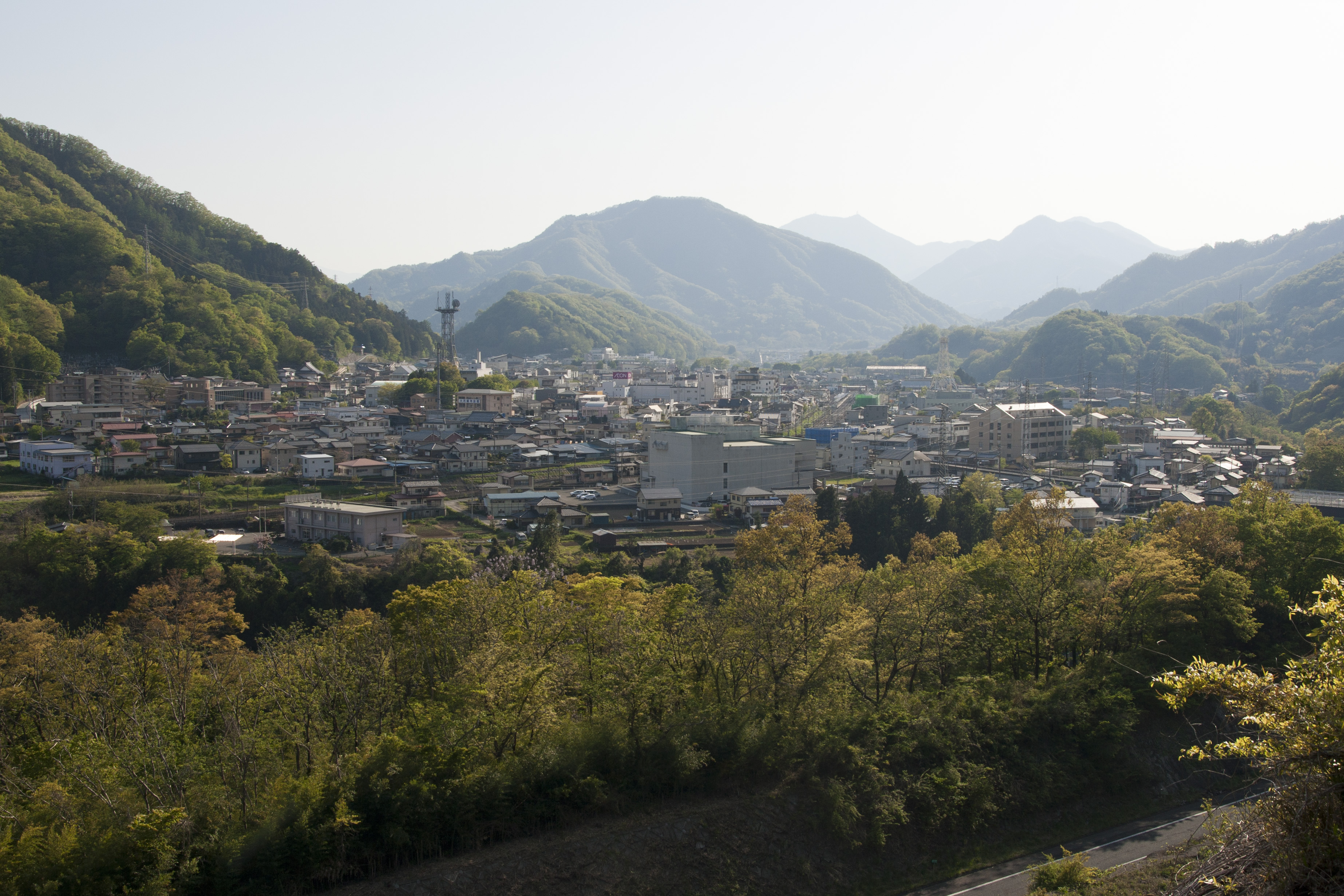
- Panoramic view of Ōtsuki City, from Mount Iwadono

- Flag Seal

- Location of Ōtsuki in Yamanashi Prefecture

- Coordinates: 35°36′38″N 138°56′24″E
- Country: Japan
- Region: Chūbu (Tōkai)
- Prefecture: Yamanashi

Government
  - Mayor: Nobuyasu Kobayashi (from August 2019)

Area
  - Total: 280.25 km^{2} (108.21 sq mi)

Population (October 1, 2023)
  - Total: 21,835
  - Density: 77.913/km^{2} (201.79/sq mi)
- Time zone: UTC+9 (Japan Standard Time)
- Phone number: 0554-22-2111
- Address: 2-6-20 Ōtsuki, Ōtsuki-shi, Yamanashi-ken 401-8601
- Climate: Cfa
- Website: Official website
- Symbols
- Flower: Lilium auratum
- Tree: Yaezakura (Prunus lannesiana)

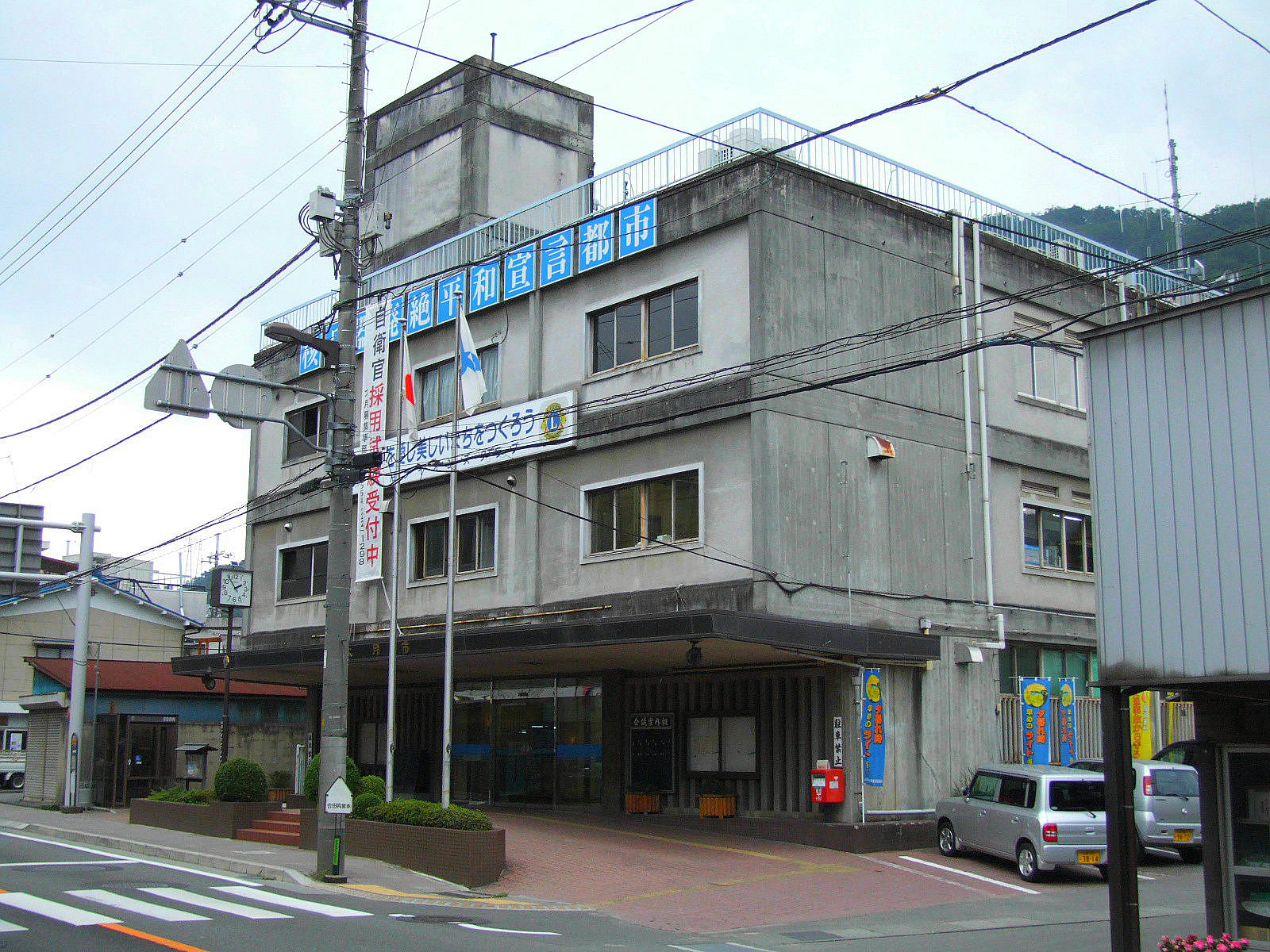
Ōtsuki City Hall

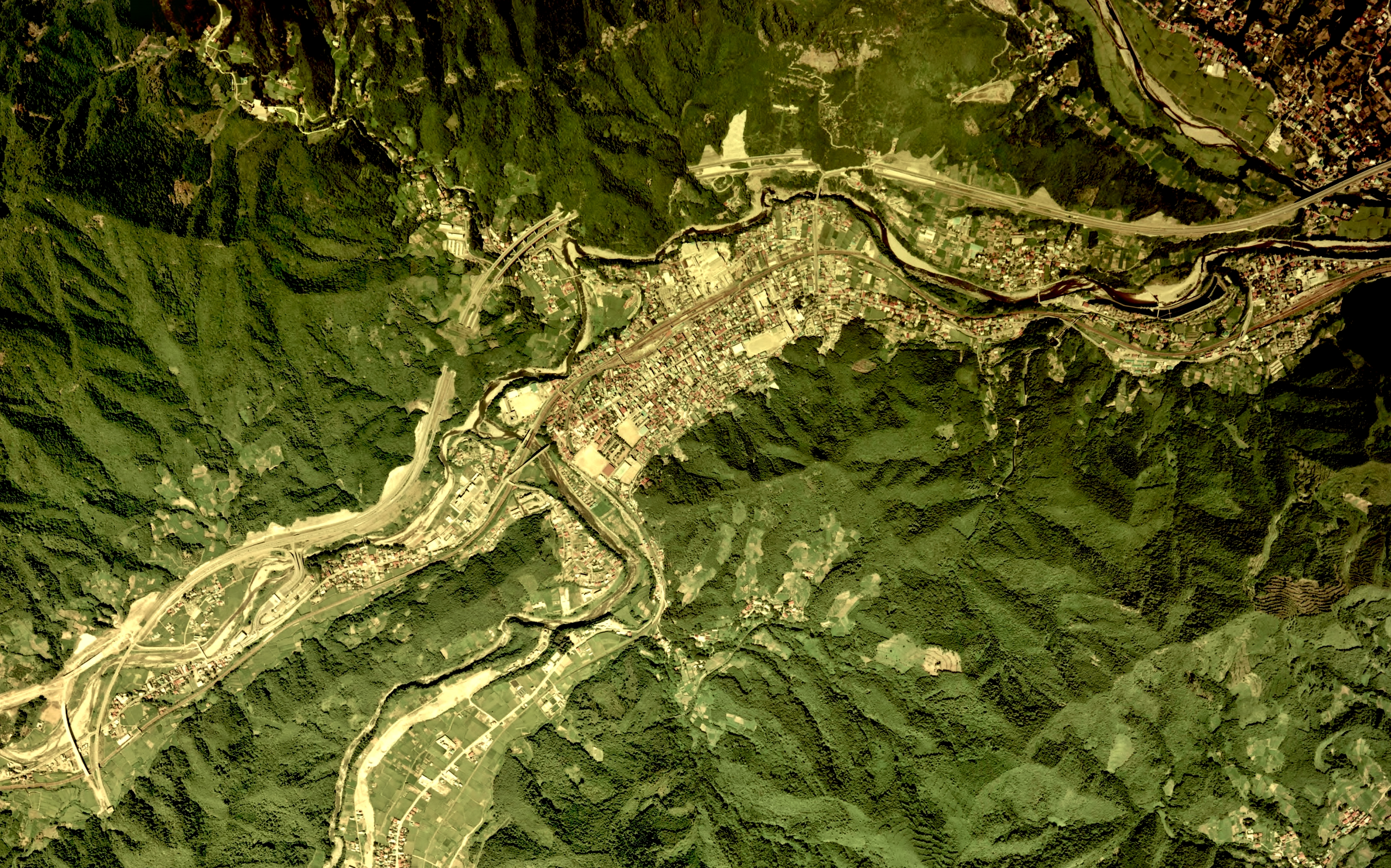
Ōtsuki city center area

Ōtsuki (大月市, Ōtsuki-shi; Japanese pronunciation: [ò̞ó̞.t͡sɨ̥.k̟ʲí(.ɕì), ó̞ó̞-]) is a city located in Yamanashi Prefecture, Japan. As of 1 October 2023, the city had an estimated population of 21,835 in 10207 households, and a population density of 86 persons per km^{2}. The total area of the city is 380.25 square kilometres (146.82 sq mi).

== Geography ==
Ōtsuki is located in eastern Yamanashi Prefecture, approximately 80 kilometers from Tokyo. the city is located in the Chichibu and the Tanzawa Mountains and the Sagami River (known locally as the Katsura River) flows through the city.

=== Surrounding municipalities ===
Yamanashi Prefecture

- Fuefuki
- Fujikawaguchiko
- Kōshū
- Kosuge
- Tsuru
- Uenohara

== Climate ==
The city has a climate characterized by hot and humid summers, and relatively mild winters (Köppen climate classification Cfa). The average annual temperature in Ōtsuki is 11.2 °C. The average annual rainfall is 1523 mm with September as the wettest month. The temperatures are highest on average in August, at around 23.5 °C, and lowest in January, at around -0.5 °C.

Climate data for Ōtsuki (1991–2020 normals, extremes 1977–present)
Month	Jan	Feb	Mar	Apr	May	Jun	Jul	Aug	Sep	Oct	Nov	Dec	Year
Record high °C (°F)	21.0 (69.8)	24.5 (76.1)	28.1 (82.6)	32.8 (91.0)	35.4 (95.7)	39.1 (102.4)	39.9 (103.8)	39.3 (102.7)	37.8 (100.0)	33.7 (92.7)	26.1 (79.0)	24.9 (76.8)	39.9 (103.8)
Mean daily maximum °C (°F)	8.6 (47.5)	9.8 (49.6)	13.3 (55.9)	19.0 (66.2)	23.6 (74.5)	25.9 (78.6)	30.0 (86.0)	31.0 (87.8)	26.5 (79.7)	20.6 (69.1)	15.8 (60.4)	11.0 (51.8)	19.6 (67.3)
Daily mean °C (°F)	1.8 (35.2)	3.0 (37.4)	6.7 (44.1)	12.1 (53.8)	16.9 (62.4)	20.4 (68.7)	24.2 (75.6)	25.0 (77.0)	21.1 (70.0)	15.2 (59.4)	9.3 (48.7)	4.1 (39.4)	13.3 (55.9)
Mean daily minimum °C (°F)	−3.3 (26.1)	−2.4 (27.7)	1.0 (33.8)	5.9 (42.6)	11.1 (52.0)	16.0 (60.8)	20.0 (68.0)	20.7 (69.3)	17.1 (62.8)	11.0 (51.8)	4.3 (39.7)	−1.0 (30.2)	8.4 (47.1)
Record low °C (°F)	−11.6 (11.1)	−12.8 (9.0)	−8.9 (16.0)	−3.9 (25.0)	0.4 (32.7)	7.3 (45.1)	12.6 (54.7)	12.8 (55.0)	5.5 (41.9)	−0.2 (31.6)	−4.1 (24.6)	−8.5 (16.7)	−12.8 (9.0)
Average precipitation mm (inches)	52.2 (2.06)	45.3 (1.78)	89.9 (3.54)	87.7 (3.45)	101.5 (4.00)	143.6 (5.65)	179.3 (7.06)	179.3 (7.06)	238.4 (9.39)	204.8 (8.06)	68.8 (2.71)	43.6 (1.72)	1,434.3 (56.47)
Average precipitation days (≥ 1.0 mm)	4.7	5.1	9.3	8.7	9.5	12.1	12.7	10.5	11.8	10.1	6.7	4.5	105.9
Mean monthly sunshine hours	202.1	188.3	188.5	189.9	194.4	137.1	157.8	188.4	133.1	139.7	163.0	181.6	2,080
Source: Japan Meteorological Agency

== Demographics ==
Per Japanese census data, the population of Ōtsuki has declined at an accelerating rate in recent decades.

Historical population
Year	Pop.	±%
1940	31,830	—
1950	41,650	+30.9%
1960	39,783	−4.5%
1970	36,858	−7.4%
1980	35,404	−3.9%
1990	34,941	−1.3%
2000	33,124	−5.2%
2010	28,120	−15.1%
2020	22,512	−19.9%

== History ==
Located in the headwaters of the Sagami River, the area around present-day Ōtsuki was heavily settled in the Jōmon period, and over 80 Jōmon sites have been found within city limits. However, there are fewer Yayoi period sites. During the Nara period ritsuryo organization of Kai Province, the area came under Tsuru County. From the middle of the Kamakura period, much of the province came under the control of the Takeda clan.

During the Edo period, all of Kai Province was tenryō territory under direct control of the Tokugawa shogunate, although the portion around modern day Ōtsuki was part of the short-lived Tamimura Domain, which was suppressed in 1704. Also during the Edo period, the Kōshū Kaidō, one of the Edo Five Routes, passed through Ōtsuki, which with 12 of the 45 post stations has more post stations than any other municipality in Japan. The eleven post stations spread from Shimotorisawa-shuku to Kuronoda-shuku.

During the cadastral reform of the early Meiji period on July 1, 1889, the village of Hirosato was created within Kitatsuru District, Yamanashi Prefecture. On April 1, 1933, the village was raised to town status, and renamed Ōtsuki. The town was bombed by the United States on August 13, 1945, only two days before the end of World War II. The town was elevated to city status on August 8, 1954, by merging with the neighboring towns of Saruhashi and Nanaho and the villages of Sasago, Nigioka, Hatsukari and Yanagawa.

== Government ==
Ōtsuki has a mayor-council form of government with a directly elected mayor and a unicameral city legislature of 12 members.

== Economy ==
Ōtsuki was noted traditionally for its production of fine silk. In the modern period, it became the location of numerous factories producing synthetic fibers.

== Education ==
- Ohtsuki City College
- Ōtsuki has five public elementary schools and two public middle schools operated by the city government and two public high schools operated by the Yamanashi Prefectural Board of Education.

== Transportation ==
=== Railway ===
- East Japan Railway Company - Chūō Main Line
  - Yanagawa – Torisawa – Saruhashi – Ōtsuki – Hatsukari – Sasago
- Fuji Kyuko - Fujikyuko Line
  - Ōtsuki - Kamiōtsuki

=== Highway ===
- Chūō Expressway
- Kawaguchiko Route
- National Route 20
- National Route 139

== Sister cities ==
- Fraser Coast, Queensland, Australia

== Local attractions ==
- Saruhashi - A famous historical bridge and designated National Place of Scenic Beauty
- Yatsuzawa Power Station

== Notable people ==
- Masahide Kobayashi – former professional baseball player
- Masanori Murakami – former professional baseball player, first Japanese to play in MLB
