= Saruhashi Station =

Railway station in Ōtsuki, Yamanashi Prefecture, Japan

JC31 Saruhashi Station 猿橋駅
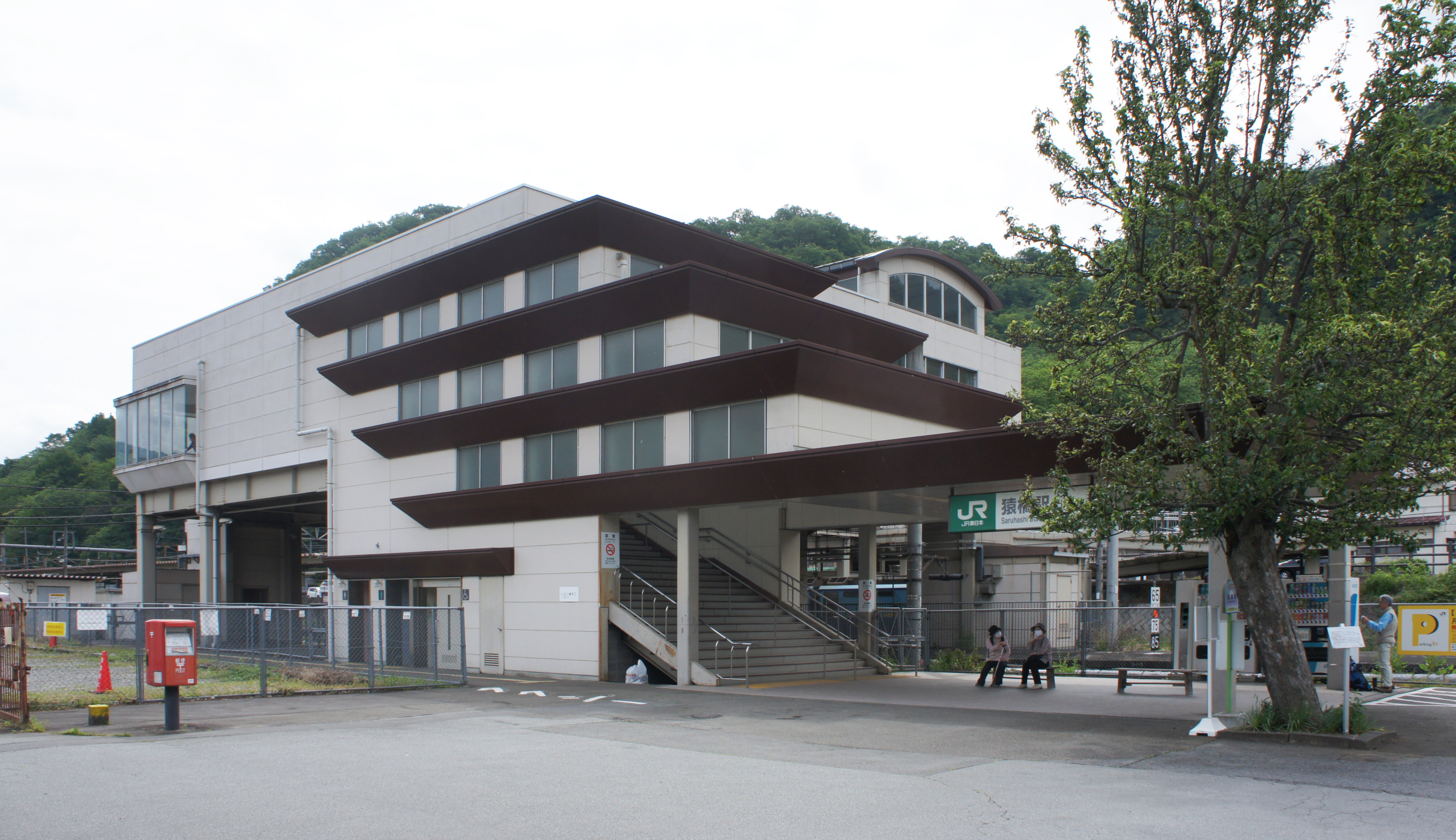
- Saruhashi Station north entrance, May 2021

General information
- Location: Tonoe, Saruhashi-machi, Ōtsuki-shi, Yamanashi-ken 409-0617; Japan
- Coordinates: 35°36′46.3″N 138°58′6.6″E
- Operator: JR East
- Line: ■ Chūō Main Line
- Distance: 85.3 km from Tokyo
- Platforms: 1 island platform
- Tracks: 2

Other information
- Status: Staffed
- Website: Official website

History
- Opened: October 1, 1902

Passengers
- FY2023: 1,928 (daily)

Services
Preceding station	JR East	Following station
Ōtsuki One-way operation	Chūō Line Commuter Special Rapid	Torisawa JC30 towards Tokyo
Ōtsuki JC32 Terminus	Chūō Line Chūō Special Rapid	Torisawa JC30 towards Tokyo
Ōtsuki JC32 Terminus	Chūō Line Commuter Rapid	Torisawa One-way operation
Ōtsuki JC32 Terminus	Chūō Line Rapid	Torisawa JC30 towards Tokyo
Ōtsuki JC32 towards Shiojiri	Chūō Main Line Local	Torisawa JC30 towards Tachikawa
Location
- Location within Yamanashi Prefecture Location within Japan

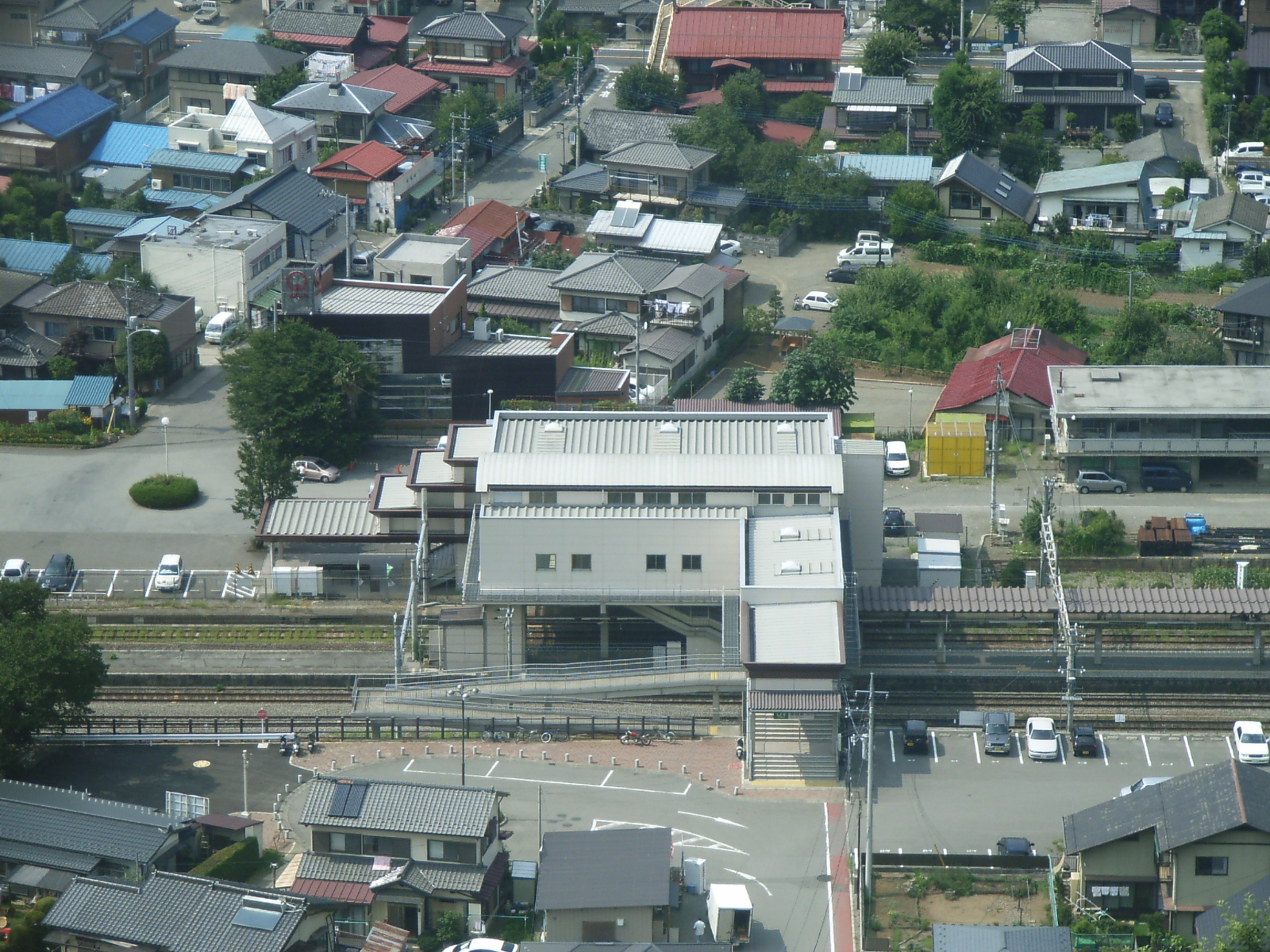
Saruhashi Station seen from nearby hill

Saruhashi Station (猿橋駅, Saruhashi-eki) is a railway station of the Chūō Main Line, East Japan Railway Company (JR East) in the city of Ōtsuki, Yamanashi Prefecture, Japan.

== Lines ==
Saruhashi Station is served by the Chūō Main Line / Chūō Rapid Line, and is 85.3 kilometers from the terminus of the line at Tokyo Station.

== Station layout ==
The station consists of one ground level island platform, with an elevated station building located above the platform. The station is staffed.

=== Platforms ===
1	■ Chūō Main Line	for Takao, Tachikawa, Shinjuku
2, 3	■ Chūō Main Line	for Ōtsuki, Kōfu and Matsumoto

== Station history ==
Saruhashi Station was opened on October 1, 1902, as a passenger and freight station on the Japanese National Railways (JNR) Chūō Main Line. The name of the station was originally Eikyo-eki, but changed to its present pronunciation of the same kanji on August 1, 1918. Freight services were discontinued from April 20, 1960. With the dissolution and privatization of the JNR on April 1, 1987, the station came under the control of the East Japan Railway Company. The station building was rebuilt in 1997. Automated turnstiles using the Suica IC Card system came into operation from November 18, 2001.

== Passenger statistics ==
In fiscal 2017, the station was used by an average of 1358 passengers daily (boarding passengers only).

== Surrounding area ==
- Saruhashi, a famous historical bridge and designated National Place of Scenic Beauty

== See also ==
- List of railway stations in Japan
