= Ohtsuki City College =

Coordinates: 35°36′46.27″N 138°56′48.67″E

- 大月短期大学
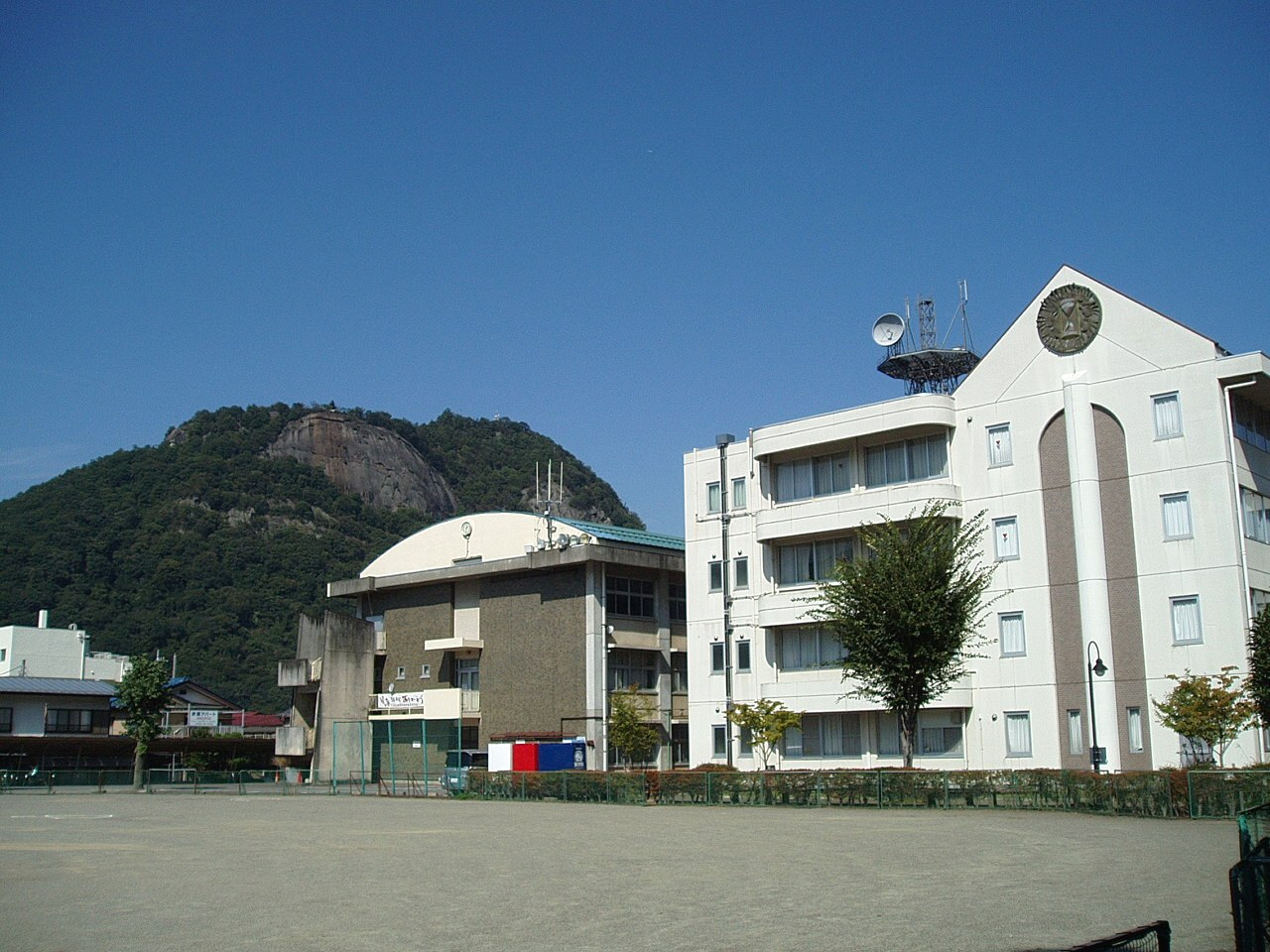
- Ohtsuki City College and Mount Iwadono
- Type: public
- Established: 1955
- Location: Ōtsuki, Yamanashi, Japan
- Website: www.ohtsuki.ac.jp

Ohtsuki City College (大月短期大学, Ōtsuki Tanki Daigaku) is a public junior college in Ōtsuki, Yamanashi, Japan. It was founded in 1955.

== Departments ==
- Department of economics

== See also ==
- List of junior colleges in Japan
