= 215 series =

Japanese train type

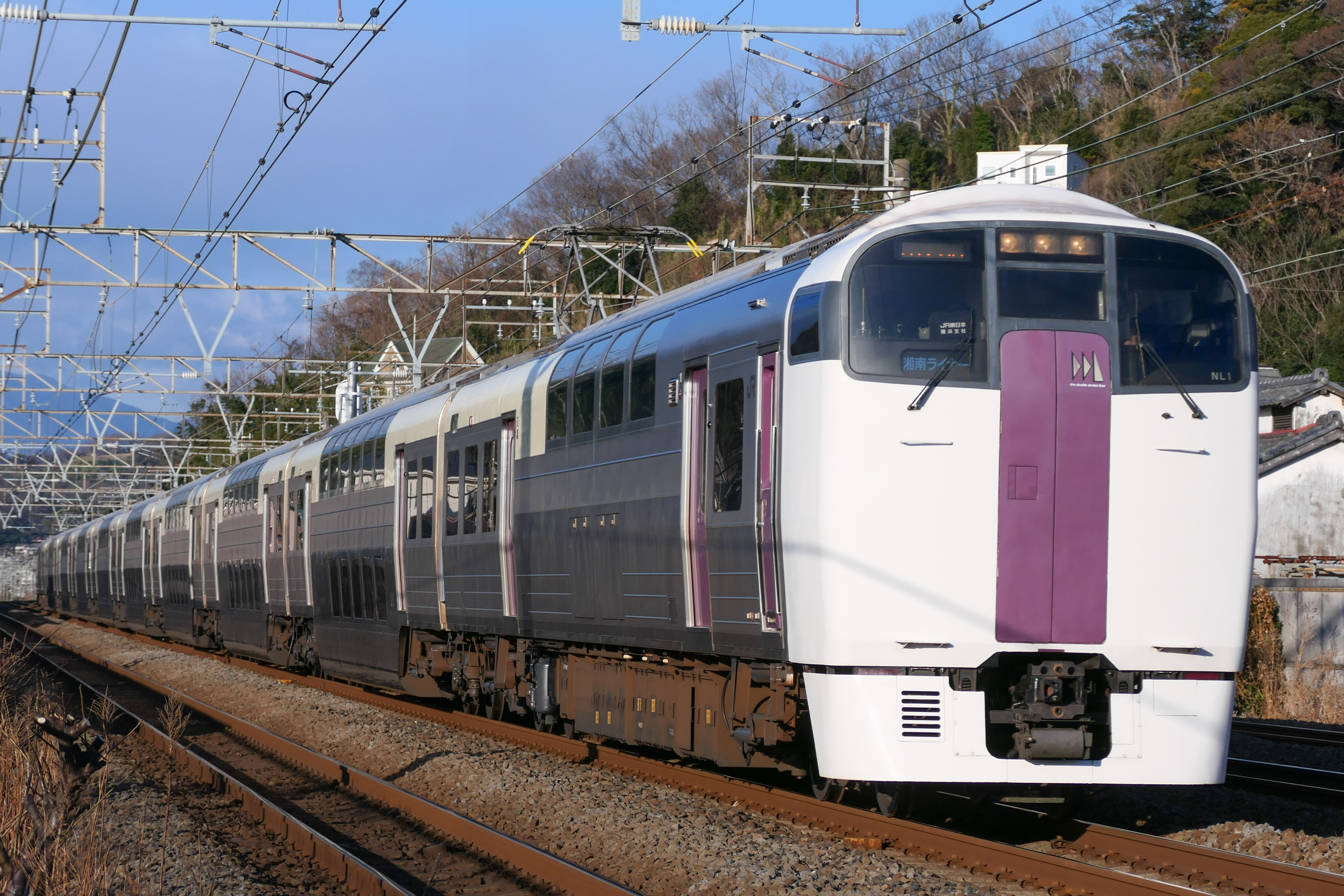
- 215 series in February 2021
- In service: 1992–March 2021
- Manufacturers: Hitachi, Nippon Sharyo
- Family name: Double Decker Liner
- Constructed: 1992–1993
- Entered service: 4 April 1992
- Scrapped: 2021
- Number built: 40 vehicles (4 sets)
- Number in service: None
- Number preserved: None
- Number scrapped: 40 vehicles (4 sets)
- Formation: 10 cars per trainset
- Fleet numbers: NL1–4
- Capacity: 1010 seated
- Operator: JR East
- Depot: Kōzu
- Line served: Chuo Main Line

Specifications
- Car body construction: Stainless steel
- Car length: 20,000 mm (65 ft 7 in)
- Width: 2,900 mm (9 ft 6 in)
- Height: 4,070 mm (13 ft 4 in)
- Doors: 2 per side
- Maximum speed: 120 km/h (75 mph)
- Traction system: Resistor control + field system superimposed field excitation control
- Electric system: 1,500 V DC overhead catenary
- Current collection: PS24 pantograph
- Safety systems: ATS-SN, ATS-P
- Track gauge: 1,067 mm (3 ft 6 in)

The 215 series (215系) was a bilevel suburban electric multiple unit (EMU) train type operated by East Japan Railway Company (JR East) in the Kantō region of Japan from 1992 to 2021.

== Design ==
The trains were built jointly by Hitachi and Nippon Sharyo. The trains were developed to accommodate the increasing number of long-distance commuters along the Tōkaidō Main Line and to provide seated services and express services using the parallel freight lines. The bilevel designs are based on the Green car of the 211 series and the prototype Kuha 415-1901 of the 415 series.

Excluding the leading cars, all cars are bilevel with ordinary-seating cars fitting at most 120 passengers. A set can carry up to 1010 passengers.

As the train was intended to be operated only on the warmer Tōkaidō Main Line, it was not designed to withstand the cold or snow. As such, the train operated on the Chūō Main Line only between spring and autumn.

== Formation ==
All sets consisted of 10 cars with only the first two cars at each end powered. Cars 4 and 5 were "Green" (first class) cars.

Car No.	1	2	3	4	5	6	7	8	9	10
Designation	Mc	M'D	TD	TSD		TD			M'D	Mc
Numbering	KuMoHa 215	MoHa 214	SaHa 215-200 (Note: Car 3 of Set NL1 is numbered SaHa 215-2.)	SaRo 214	SaRo 215	SaHa 214		SaHa 215-100 (Note: Car 8 of Set NL1 is numbered SaHa 215-1.)	MoHa 214-100	KuMoHa 215-100

== Interior ==
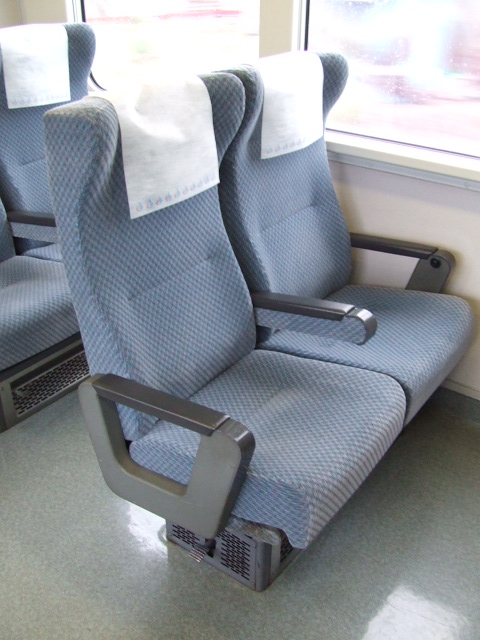
Lower level Green car seating

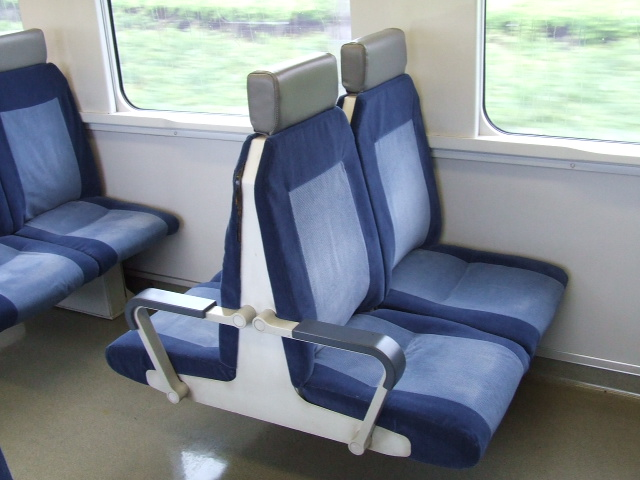
Lower level ordinary class seating

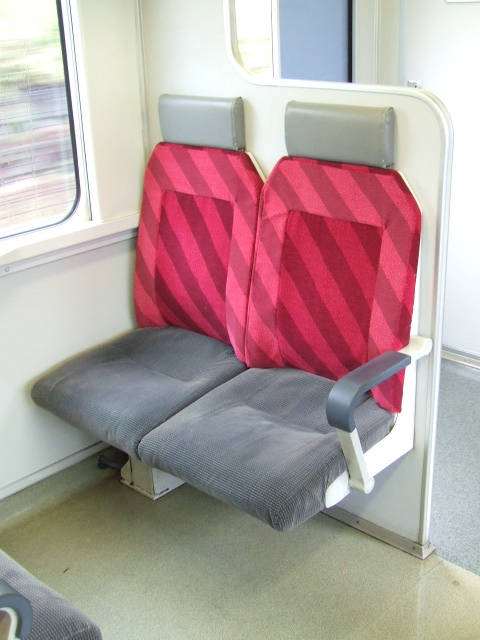
Priority seat in lower level ordinary class saloon

== History ==
The first trainset was delivered in March 1992, and entered service from 4 April 1992 on Tōkaidō Main Line daytime Acty rapid services and evening Shōnan Liner services. Three more sets were delivered in October 1993. The 215 series suffered from multiple issues related to the bilevel design while operating as the Acty. The bilevel design meant each car only had two doors on each side of the vehicle, and the 10 car formation was considered short on the Tokaido Main Line which mainly operated with 15-car trains. Due to these problems, it took a considerate amount of time for passengers to get on and off at each stop, and delays became noticeable.

From December 2001, the 215 series fleet was removed from Tōkaidō Line Acty services, and reassigned to new Shōnan–Shinjuku Line services between Shinjuku and Yokosuka. Their use on Shōnan–Shinjuku Line services continued until 16 October 2004, from which date all Shōnan–Shinjuku Line services were standardized with E231 series rolling stock.

From October 2004 onward, scheduled services using 215 series stock were limited to a small number of weekday Home Liner services, with only occasional holiday weekend workings, such as the Holiday Rapid View Yamanashi on the Chūō Main Line. The 215 series was ridiculed amongst Japanese railroad fans as the "NEET Liner" as, besides the occasional limited services, the train was often moved between Shinagawa and Kōzu as an out-of-service train.

With the abolition of the Shōnan Liner service with the 2021 timetable revision, the 215 series sets were withdrawn from service on 12 March 2021, a day before the timetable revision. No special events were held to mark their withdrawal. No 215 series cars have been preserved, with two sets being scrapped at Nagano General Rolling Stock Center and the other two sets scrapped at the Aomori branch of the Morioka Rolling Stock Center.
