= Ōtsuki Station =

Railway station in Ōtsuki, Yamanashi Prefecture, Japan

JC32 Ōtsuki Station 大月駅
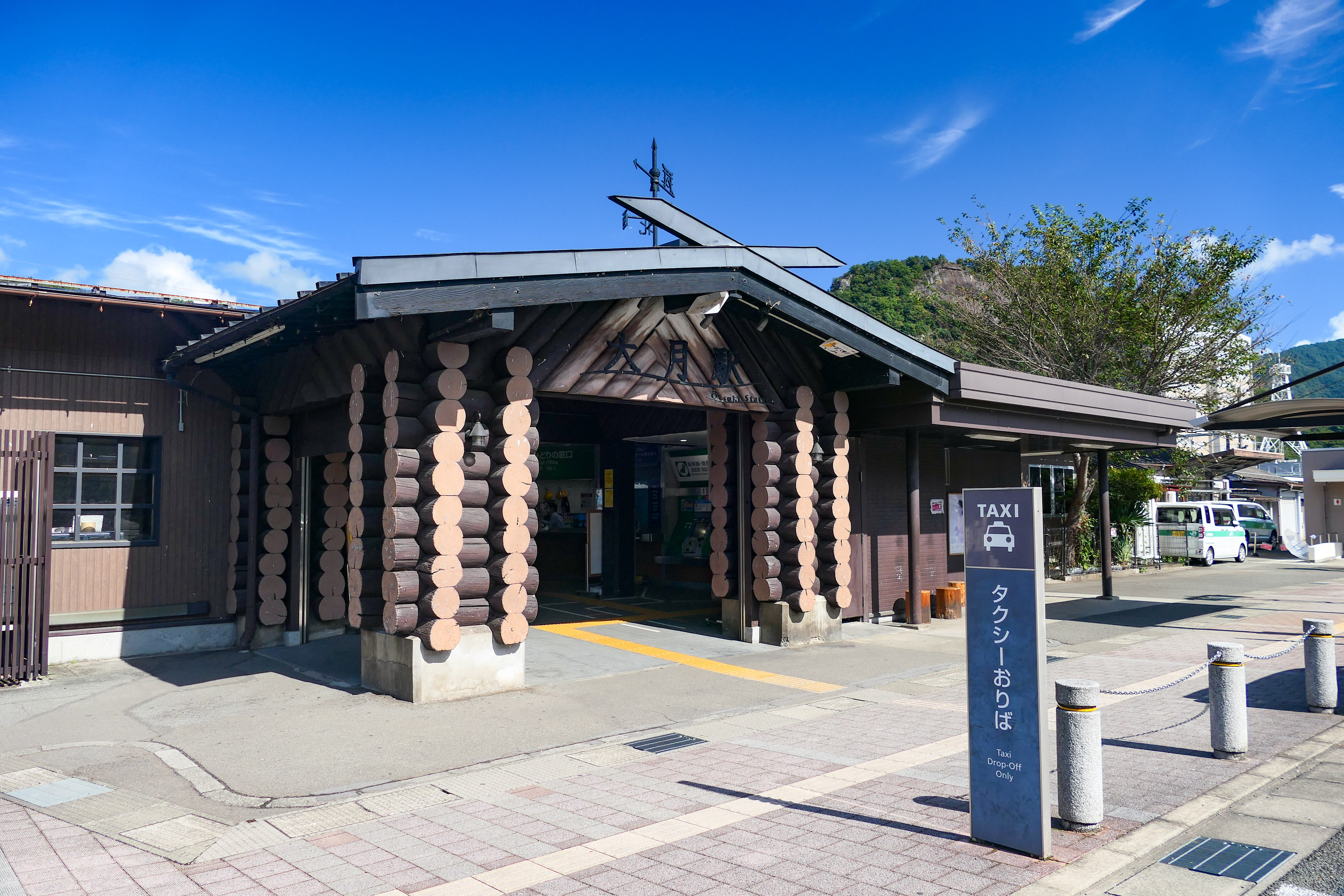
- Ōtsuki Station, October 2024

General information
- Location: 1-1-1 Ōtsuki, Ōtsuki-shi Yamanashi-ken; Japan
- Coordinates: 35°36′48″N 138°56′34″E
- Elevation: 358 m (1,175 ft)
- Operator: JR East; Fuji Kyuko
- Lines: ■ Chūō Main Line; ■ Fujikyuko Line
- Distance: 87.8 km from Tokyo
- Platforms: 1 side + 2 island platforms
- Tracks: 5
- Connections: Bus stop

Other information
- Status: Staffed (Midori no Madoguchi)
- Station code: JC32 (JR), FJ01 (Fuji Kyuko)
- Website: Official website

History
- Opened: 1 October 1902; 123 years ago

Passengers
- FY2024: 11,288 daily; 4,462 daily

Services
Preceding station	JR East	Following station
Enzan CO37 towards Hakuba	Azusa	Hachiōji JC22 towards Chiba or Tokyo
Enzan CO37 towards Ryūō	Kaiji	Hachiōji JC22 towards Tokyo
through to Fuji Kyuko	Fuji Excursion	Hachiōji JC22 towards Shinjuku
Terminus	Chūō Line Commuter Special Rapid Chūō Special Rapid	Saruhashi JC31 towards Tokyo
Terminus	Chūō Line Commuter Rapid	Saruhashi One-way operation
Terminus	Chūō Line Rapid	Saruhashi JC31 towards Tokyo
Hatsukari CO33 towards Shiojiri	Chūō Main Line Local	Saruhashi JC31 towards Tachikawa
Preceding station	Fuji Kyuko	Following station
Tsurubunkadaigakumae (FJ08) towards Kawaguchiko	Fuji Excursion	through to JR East
Tsurubunkadaigakumae (FJ08) towards Kawaguchiko	Fujisan and Mt. Fuji View	Terminus
Kamiōtsuki (FJ02) towards Kawaguchiko	Fujikyuko Line	Terminus
Location
- Location within Yamanashi Prefecture Location within Japan

Ōtsuki Station (大月駅, Ōtsuki-eki) is a railway station on the Chūō Main Line in the city of Ōtsuki, Yamanashi, Japan, jointly operated by the East Japan Railway Company (JR East) and Fuji Kyuko.

== Lines ==
Ōtsuki Station is served by the Chūō Main Line (including Chūō Line (Rapid) services) from Tokyo, and is 87.8 rail kilometers from the terminus of the line at Tokyo Station on the Chūō Main Line. It is also the terminus of the privately operated 26.6 km (16.5 mi) Fujikyuko Line to Kawaguchiko.

Kaiji limited express services and some Azusa and Super Azusa limited express services stop at this station. A limited number of Narita Express trains also stop at this station, with some of them continuing on to Kawaguchiko on the Fujikyuko Line.

== Station layout ==
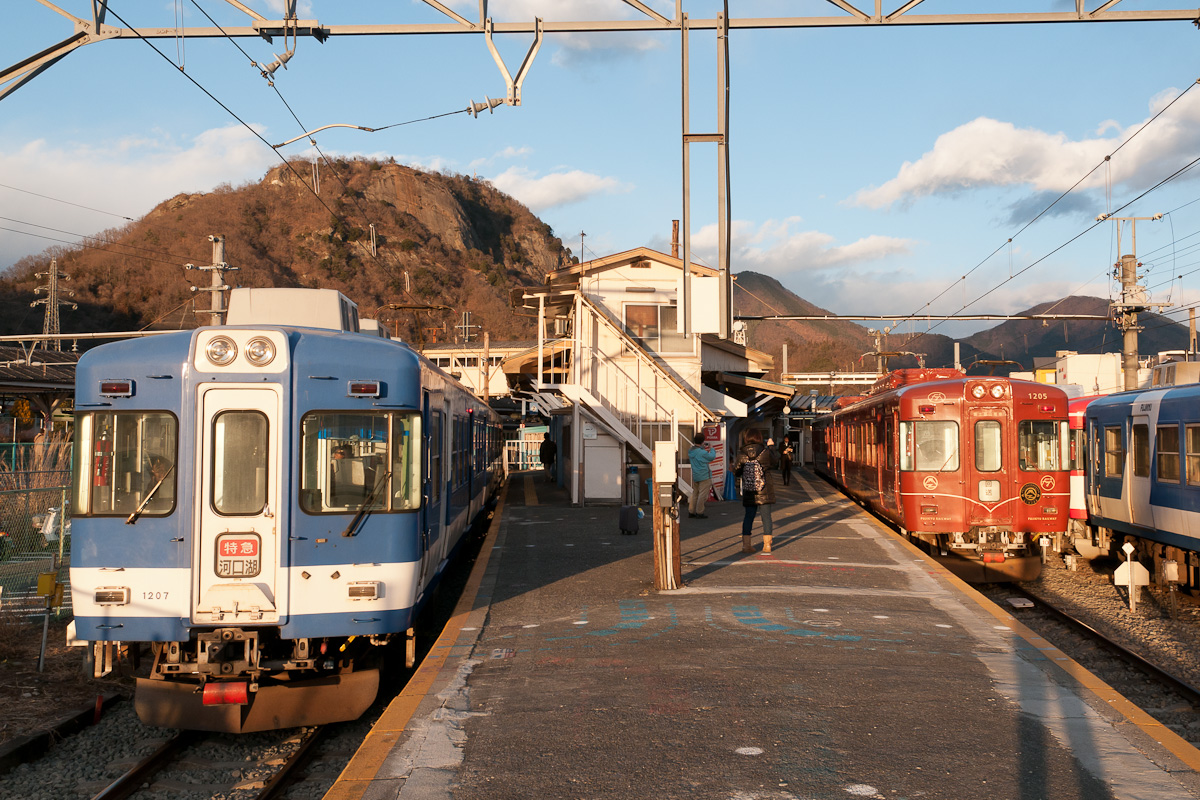
Fujikyuko Line platforms 1 & 2, January 2011

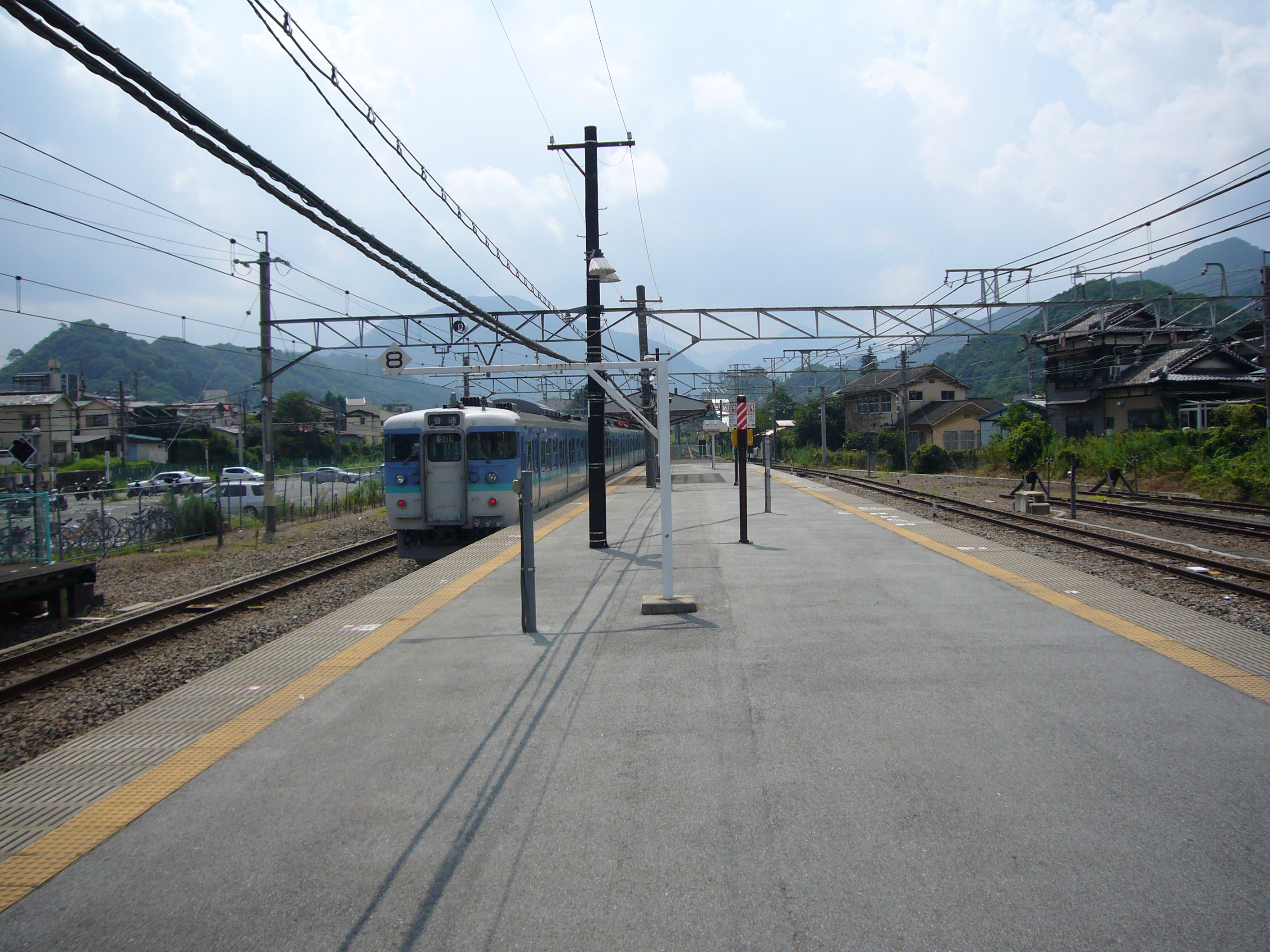
View of JR East platforms 4 & 5, August 2006

The JR East section of the station consists of one side platform and one island platform serving three tracks, connected by a footbridge. The station has a Midori no Madoguchi staffed ticket office.

The Fujikyuko section of the station consists of a single island platform serving two terminating tracks, and also shares Platform 3, the side platform, with JR East.

=== Platforms ===
1, 2	■ Fujikyuko Line	for Fujisan and Kawaguchiko
3	■ Chūō Main Line	for Kōfu, Kobuchizawa, Kami-Suwa, and Matsumoto
3	■ Chūō Main Line	for Hachiōji, Shinjuku, and Tokyo
3	■ Chūō Line (Rapid)	for Takao, Hachiōji, Tachikawa, Shinjuku, and Tokyo
4	■ Chūō Line (Rapid)	for Takao, Hachiōji, Tachikawa, Shinjuku, and Tokyo
4	■ Fujikyuko Line	for Fujisan and Kawaguchiko (through services)
5	■ Chūō Main Line	for Hachiōji, Shinjuku, and Tokyo
5	■ Chūō Line (Rapid)	for Takao,Hachiōji, Tachikawa, Shinjuku, and Tokyo

== Station history ==
Ōtsuki Station opened on 1 October 1902. The Fujikyuko station opened on 19 June 1929.

== Passenger statistics ==
In fiscal 2017, the JR East station was used by an average of 5,377 passengers daily (boarding passengers only). The Fujiyuko portion of the station was used by an average of 3417 passengers daily (boarding passengers only) in 2016.

The passenger figures for JR East in previous years are as shown below.

Fiscal year	Daily average
2000	5,825
2005	5,378
2010	5,241
2015	5,528

== Surrounding area ==
- Ōtsuki City Office
- Ohtsuki City College
- National Route 20
