= Oiwake-shuku =

Twentieth rest area along the route from Edo to Kyoto

Coordinates: 36.3391°N 138.5427°E

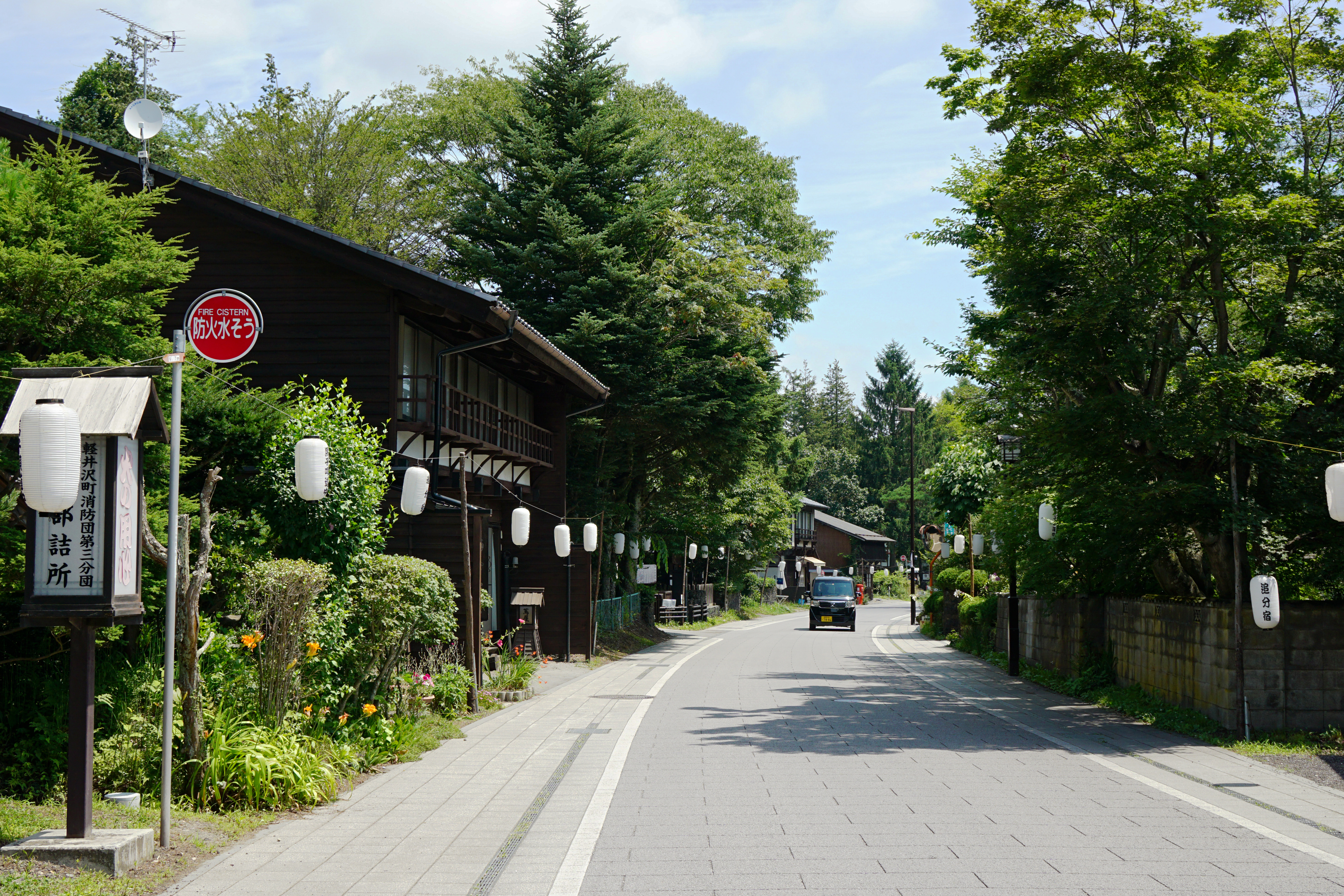
Oiwake-shuku

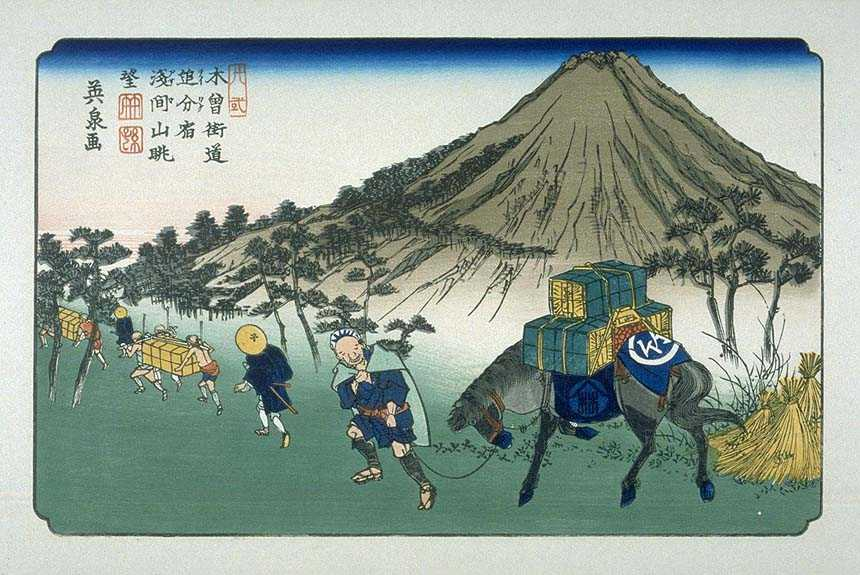
Keisai Eisen's print of Oiwake-shuku, part of The Sixty-nine Stations of the Kiso Kaidō series

Oiwake-shuku (追分宿, Oiwake-shuku) was the twentieth of the sixty-nine stations of the Nakasendō. It is located in the present-day town of Karuizawa, in the Kitasaku District of Nagano Prefecture, Japan.

== History ==
This post town was named Oiwake, which means "where two roads split," because it was at this point that the Nakasendō split from the Hokkoku Kaidō. In the late 17th century, during the Genroku period, it flourished as a post town that could hold over 200 guests. There are still many remnants from the Edo period in the town today.

Though not a neighboring post town, Matsuida-shuku also provides a direct connection to Oiwake-shuku along the Nakasendō, by way of a minor hime kaidō. This hime kaidō allows travelers to avoid the Usuinoseki Checkpoint, one of the major checkpoints along the highway.

== Neighboring post towns ==
Nakasendō
Kutsukake-shuku - Oiwake-shuku - Otai-shuku
Hokkoku Kaidō
Oiwake-shuku (starting location) - Komoro-shuku
