= Himekawa =

Himekawa (written: 姫川) is a Japanese surname which means "Princess of Rivers". It may refer to:

- Akira Himekawa, a pen name of a duo of female Japanese comic book artists
- Himekawa Dam, three dams in Hakuba, Nagano Prefecture, Japan
- Himekawa Station (Hokkaido), a railway station in Mori, Japan
- Himekawa Station (Niigata), a railway station in Itoigawa, Japan

== Fictional characters ==
- Aoi Himekawa, a supporting character in the anime series Haikyu!!
- Elena Himekawa, a supporting character in the anime series Phi Brain: Kami no Puzzle
- Fuuka Himekawa, a main character in the game Kamikaze ☆ Explorer!
- Hayuru Himekawa, a main character in the anime/light novel series Masou Gakuen HxH
- Kaori Himekawa, a supporting character in the anime/manga Kenkō Zenrakei Suieibu Umishō
- Kazumi Himekawa, a supporting character in the game series Pia Carrot e Youkoso!!
- Kotone Himekawa, a supporting character in the anime/game series To Heart
- Maika Himekawa, a supporting character in the anime/manga series Shugo Chara!
- Tatsuya Himekawa, a supporting character in the anime/manga series Beelzebub
- Tokino Himekawa, a supporting character in the anime/light novel series Saenai Heroine no Sodatekata
- Youko Himekawa, a supporting character in the anime/manga series Natsu no Arashi!
- Yuki Himekawa, a supporting character in the anime/game series THE iDOLM@STER CINDERELLA GIRLS
