= Kutsukake-shuku =

Coordinates: 36.3486°N 138.5917°E

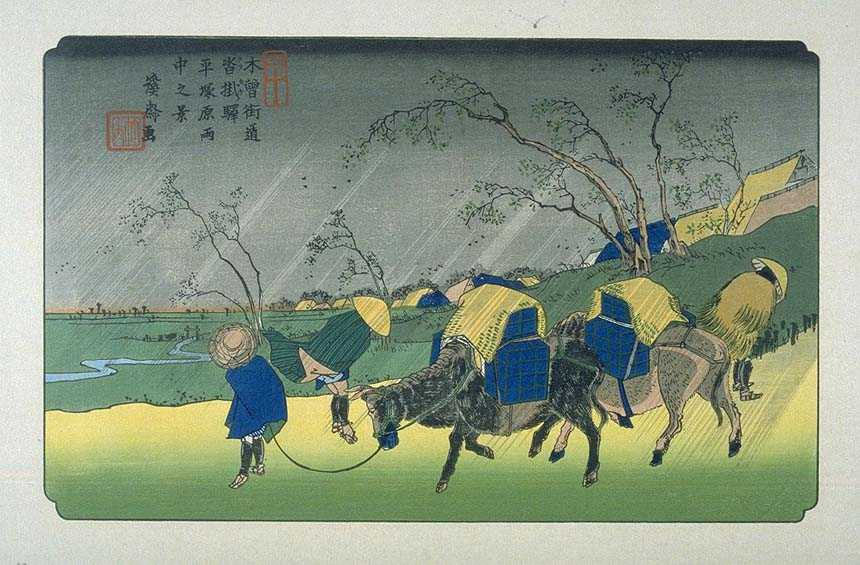
Keisai Eisen's print of Kutsukake-shuku, part of The Sixty-nine Stations of the Kiso Kaidō series

Kutsukake-shuku (沓掛宿, Kutsukake-shuku) was the nineteenth of the sixty-nine stations of the Nakasendō. It is located in the present-day town of Karuizawa, in the Kitasaku District of Nagano Prefecture, Japan.

== History ==
This post town's name, which roughly translates to "stuck shoes," came about because it was located near the western entrance to the difficult Usui Pass. When there was severe weather, it was impossible for people or animals to pass. Kutsukake-shuku, along with the neighboring Karuisawa-shuku and Oiwake-shuku, was one of the Sengenmi Shuku ("three shallow passes").

In 1951, there was a large fire, which destroyed nearly all of the remaining historical buildings. All that remains of the honjin are a well and a storehouse.

== Neighboring post towns ==
Nakasendō
Karuisawa-shuku - Kutsukake-shuku - Oiwake-shuku
