= Matsumoto Kaidō =

Pre-modern Japanese road

- 松本街道

Route information
- Length: 120 km (75 mi)
- Time period: Jomon to Edo
- Cultural significance: Most important road connecting Shinano with the Sea of Japan

Major junctions
- From: Matsumoto, Nagano

Location
- Country: Japan

Highway system
- National highways of Japan; Expressways of Japan
- National Historic Site of Japan

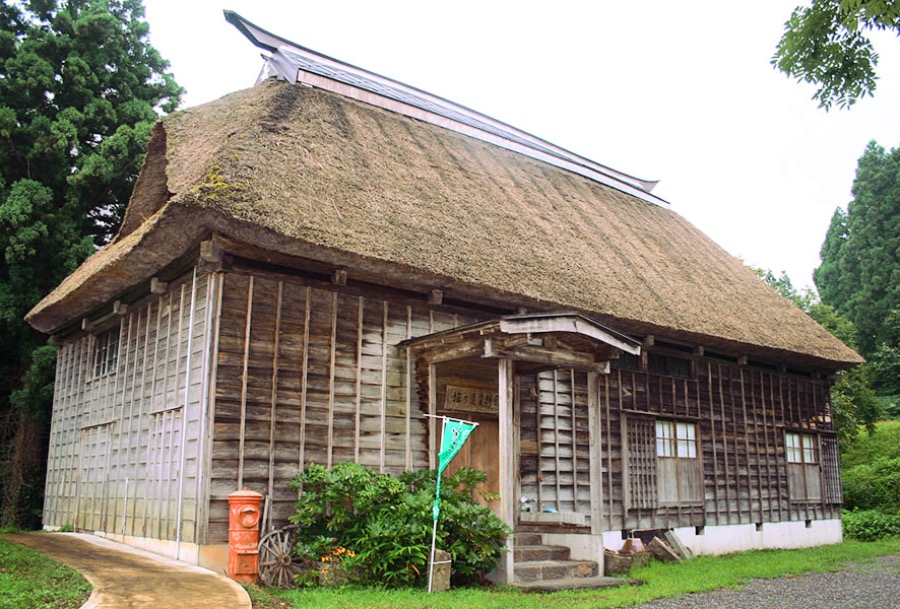
Shio-no-michi Shiryokan, Itoigawa, Niigata

The Matsumoto Kaidō (松本街道), also known as the Chikuni Kaidō (千国街道), the Itoigawa Kaidō (糸魚川街道) or simply as the Shio-no-michi (塩の道) was a secondary road in pre-modern Japan, connecting Matsumoto in Shinano Province with Itoigawa in Echigo Province. In the year 2002, a well-preserved 20-kilometer section of the original path in the city of Itoigawa was designated a National Historic Site of Japan, and an additional 10-kilometer section was added in 2007.

== Overview ==
The Matsumoto Kaidō was a steep mountain trail following the Himekawa River valley, about 120 kilometers in length, and has been in existence since very ancient times, as evidenced by Jōmon period jade beads and jadeite stone axes produced in the Itoigawa area found at archaeological sites in the Kantō region of Japan. The road was used for the transport of salt and preserved seafood from the Sea of Japan to inland regions, and for the export of soybeans, tobacco, herbal medicines, cotton, hemp and livestock from Shinano Province and the Kantō region. The standard method of travel was by foot, as wheeled carts were almost nonexistent and the road was too steep in most places. The route was also frequently closed due to heavy snowfall, avalanches, landslides, and flooding.

Salt was a critical commodity in pre-modern Japan, and the Sengoku period warlord Uesugi Kenshin was famous for abolishing taxes on salt and allowing it to be exported to his enemy, Takada Shingen, both as a gesture of magnanimity and also to remove a possible casus belli. The salt trade came to be monopolized by six merchant houses from Shinano, who received official permits from the Tokugawa shogunate in 1604. Pack horses and cows were used to transport loads at an average pace of 30 kilometers per day. During the Edo period, as no daimyō processions used the route for sankin-kōtai, no formal system of post stations with honjin was established. However, there were numerous checkpoints where domain officials examined travel permits and cargos, levied taxes, and at which were located small shops whose exorbitant prices and lack of goods was a perennial complaint by travellers. The checkpoints were removed after the Meiji restoration in 1867.

After the start of the Meiji period, the opening of the Shin'etsu Main Line and the Ōito Line railways, and later Japan National Route 147 / Japan National Route 148 eliminated the need for this road by 1892, and it gradually fell into ruin, although portions continued to be used as forestry roads and by local inhabitants. The city of Itoigawa maintains a museu, the Shio-no-michi Shiryokan (塩の道資料館) with historical materials on the route.

== See also ==
- Edo Five Routes
