= Matsuida-shuku =

Coordinates: 36.3152°N 138.7964°E

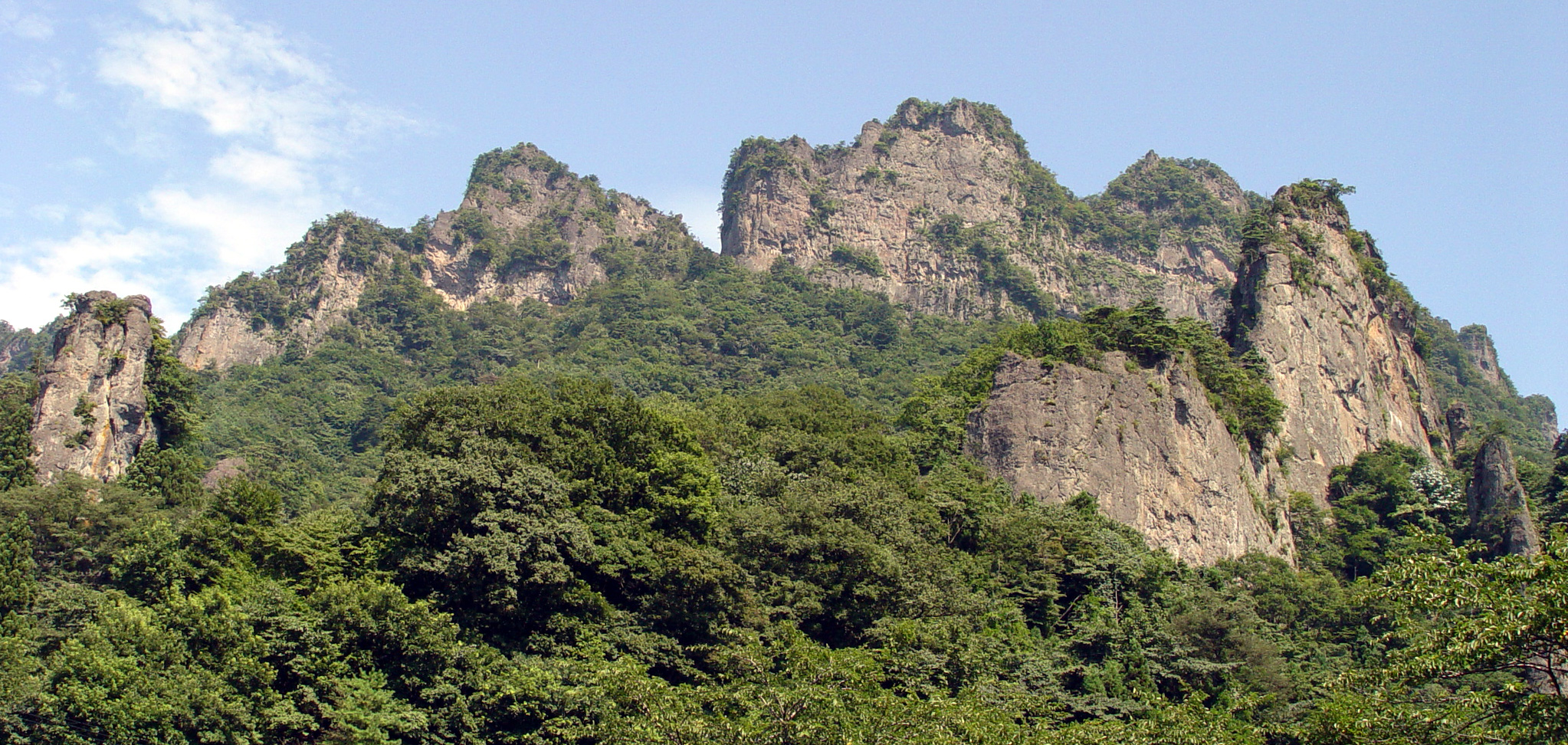
Mount Myōgi, which overlooks the post station

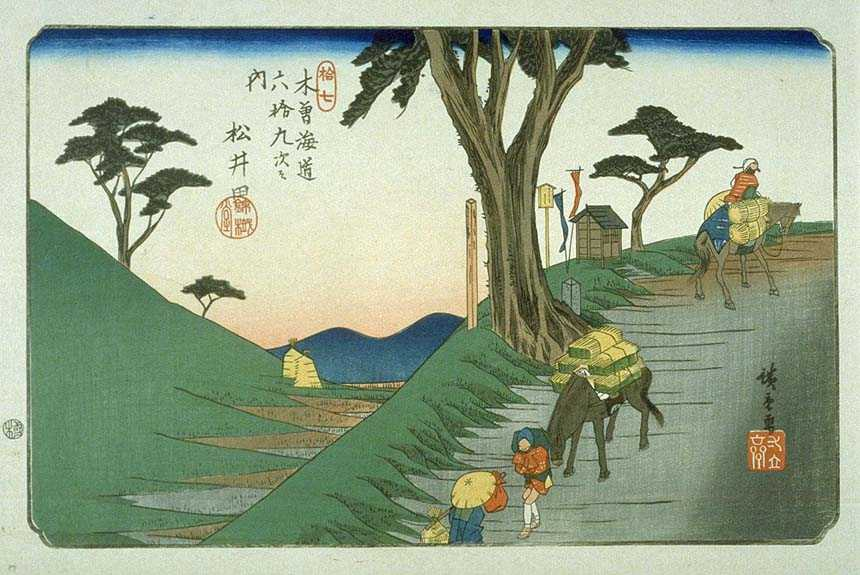
Hiroshige's print of Matsuida-shuku, part of the series The Sixty-nine Stations of the Kiso Kaidō

Matsuida-shuku (松井田宿, Matsuida-shuku) was the sixteenth of the sixty-nine stations of the Nakasendō. It is located in the present-day city of Annaka, Gunma Prefecture, Japan, at the foot of Mount Myōgi.

== Travel towards Kyoto ==
Usuinoseki Checkpoint was one of the four major checkpoints along the Nakasendō and was between Matsuida-shuku and Sakamoto-shuku. Travelers who wanted to avoid this checkpoint could make use of a hime kaidō that would take them over the mountains and to Oiwake-shuku, the twentieth station on the Nakasendō.

== Neighboring Post Towns ==
Nakasendō
Annaka-shuku - Matsuida-shuku - Sakamoto-shuku
