= Hiraiwa =

Hiraiwa (written: 平岩) is a Japanese surname. Notable people with the surname include:

- Hiraiwa Chikayoshi (平岩 親吉, 1542–1611), Japanese daimyō
- Kami Hiraiwa (平岩 紙, born 1979), Japanese actress
- Yumie Hiraiwa (平岩 弓枝, born 1932), Japanese writer
- Yuna Hiraiwa (平岩 優奈, born 1998), Japanese artistic gymnast

== See also ==
- Hiraiwa Station, a railway station in Itoigawa, Niigata Prefecture, Japan
