= Kubiki-Ōno Station =

Railway station in Itoigawa, Niigata Prefecture, Japan

Kubiki-Ōno Station 頸城大野駅
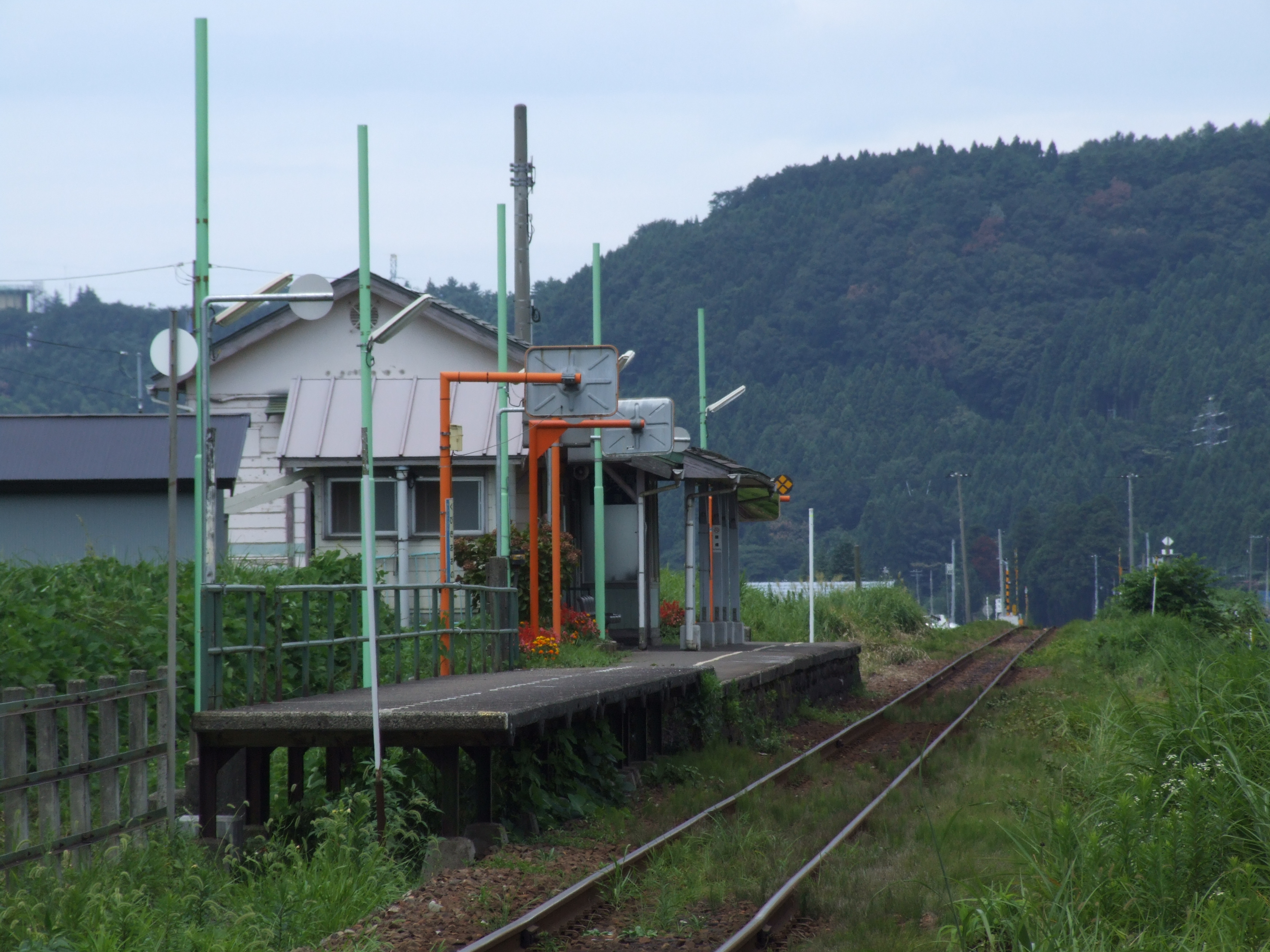
- Kubiki-Ōno Station, May 2009

General information
- Location: Ono, Itoigawa-shi, Niigata-ken 941-0071; Japan
- Coordinates: 37.0060°N 137.8727°E
- Operator: JR West
- Line: ■ Ōito Line
- Distance: 100.3 km from Matsumoto
- Platforms: 1 side platform
- Tracks: 1

Other information
- Status: Unstaffed
- Website: Official website

History
- Opened: 14 November 1934; 91 years ago

Passengers
- 9 (FY2016)

Services
Preceding station	JR West	Following station
Himekawa towards Itoigawa	Ōito Line	Nechi towards Minami-Otari
Location
- Location within Japan

Kubiki-Ōno Station (頸城大野駅, Kubiki-Ōno-eki) is a railway station in the city of Itoigawa, Niigata, Japan, operated by West Japan Railway Company (JR West).

== Lines ==
Kubiki-Ōno Station is served by the Ōito Line and is 30.2 kilometers from the intermediate terminus of the line at Minami-Otari Station, and is 100.3 kilometers from the terminus of the line at Matsumoto Station.

== Station layout ==
The station consists of one ground-level side platform serving a single bi-directional track. The station is unattended.

== History ==
Kubiki-Ōno Station opened on 14 November 1934. With the privatization of Japanese National Railways (JNR) on 1 April 1987, the station came under the control of JR West.

== Passenger statistics ==
In fiscal 2016, the station was used by an average of 8 passengers daily (boarding passengers only).

== Surrounding area ==
- National Route 148
- Ono Post Office

== See also ==
- List of railway stations in Japan
