= Itoigawa =

Itoigawa 糸魚川市
- City
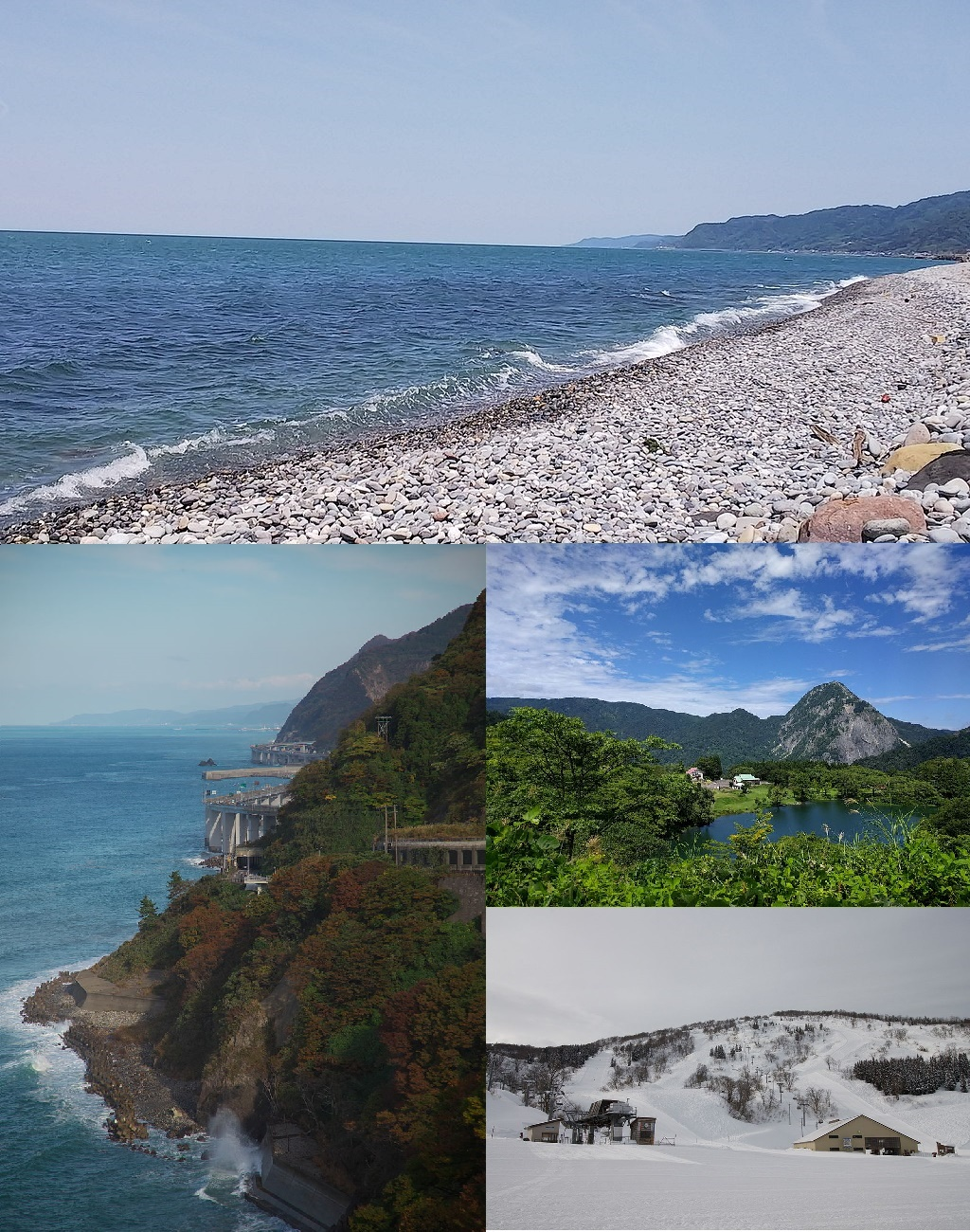
Hisui Kaigan ("Jade Beach"
| Oya-shirazu | Lake Takanami & Mt Myojo |
| Oya-shirazu | Charmant Hiuchi Snow Resort |
- Flag Seal

- Location of Itoigawa in Niigata

- Coordinates: 37°2′20.5″N 137°51′45.6″E
- Country: Japan
- Region: Chūbu (Kōshin'etsu) (Hokuriku)
- Prefecture: Niigata
- First official recorded: 100 AD
- City settled: June 1, 1954

Government
  - Mayor: Ikuo Kubota (久保田郁夫) - from April 2025

Area
  - Total: 746.24 km^{2} (288.12 sq mi)

Population (September 1, 2024)
  - Total: 38,224
  - Density: 51.222/km^{2} (132.66/sq mi)
- Time zone: UTC+9 (Japan Standard Time)
- Symbols
  - Tree: Siebold's beech
  - Flower: Lilium japonicum
  - Bird: Common kingfisher
  - Stone: Jade
- Phone number: 025-552-1511
- Address: 1-2-5 Ichinomiya, Itoigawa-shi, Niigata-ken 941-8501
- Climate: Cfa
- Website: Official website

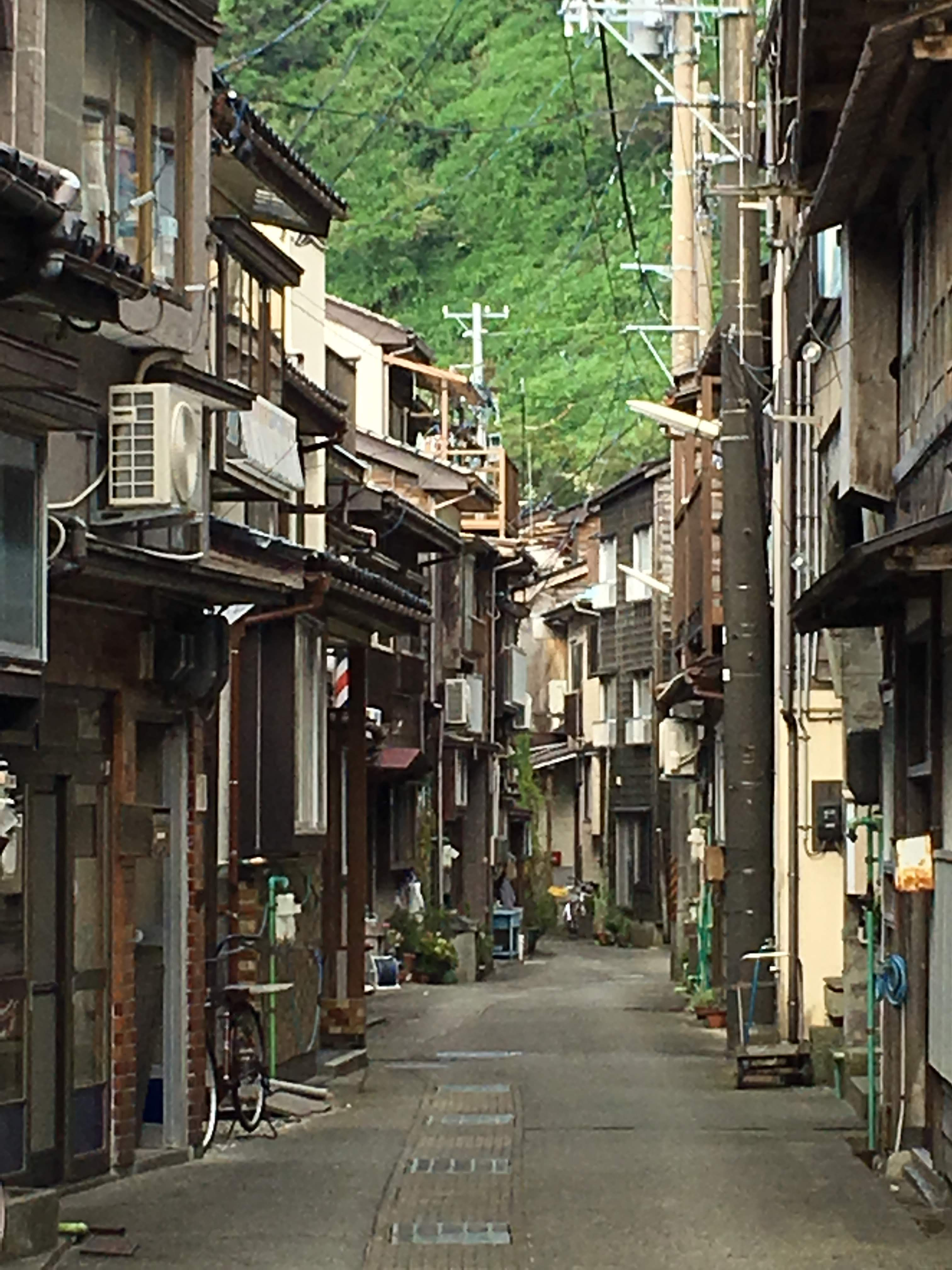
Tsutsuishi city scape

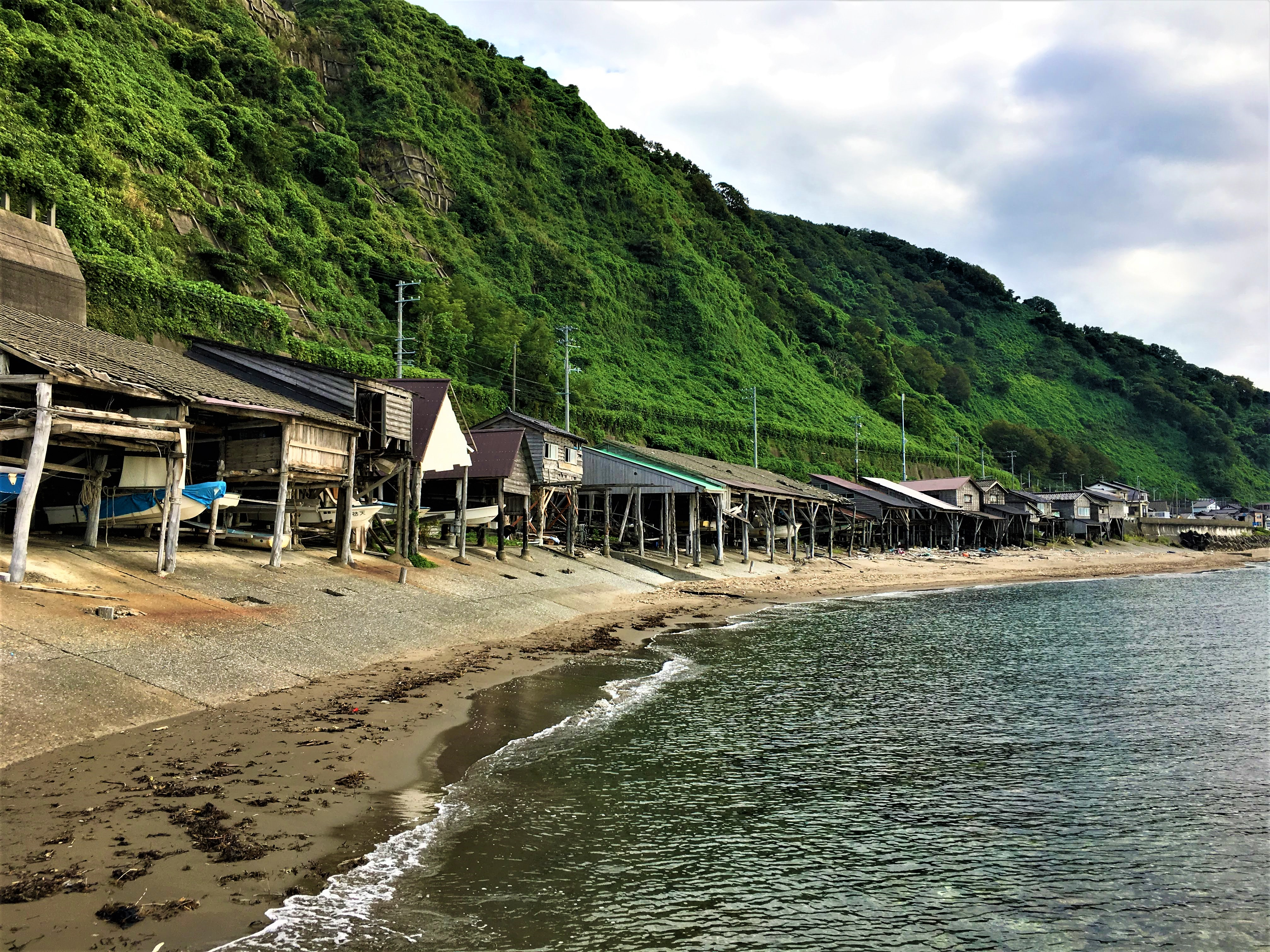
Tsutsuishi funaya

Itoigawa (糸魚川市, Itoigawa-shi; Japanese pronunciation: [ì.tó̞.í.ɡä̀.β̞ä̀, -tó̞ì.ɡä̀.β̞ä̀, -ŋä̀.β̞ä̀, -tó̞í.ɡä́.β̞ä́.ɕì, -ŋä́.β̞ä́-]) is a city located in Niigata Prefecture, Japan. As of 1 September 2024, the city had an estimated population of 38,224 living in 17,028 households, and a population density of 51 persons per km^{2}. The total area of the city is 746.24 square kilometres (288.12 sq mi).

== Geography ==
Itoigawa is located in the far southwestern corner of Niigata Prefecture, bordered by the Sea of Japan to the north, Nagano Prefecture to the south, and Toyama Prefecture to the west. Parts of the city are within the borders of the Chūbu-Sangaku National Park or the Myōkō-Togakushi Renzan National Park. Itoigawa is also famous for its jade which can be found on local beaches. Itoigawa also lends its name to the Itoigawa-Shizuoka Tectonic Line, a major fault that runs from Itoigawa, through Lake Suwa to the city of Shizuoka in Shizuoka Prefecture, forming the western border of the Fossa Magna.

=== Surrounding municipalities ===
- Nagano Prefecture
  - Hakuba
  - Otari
- Niigata Prefecture
  - Jōetsu
  - Myōkō
- Toyama Prefecture
  - Asahi

=== Climate ===
Itoigawa has a humid subtropical climate (Köppen Cfa) characterized by warm, wet summers and cold winters with heavy snowfall. The average annual temperature in Itoigawa is 14.4 °C (57.9 °F). The average annual rainfall is 2,901.5 mm (114.23 in) with December as the wettest month. The temperatures are highest on average in August, at around 26.6 °C (79.9 °F), and lowest in January, at around 3.6 °C (38.5 °F). In addition, Itoigawa has the highest record warm daily minimum in Japan, at 31.4 °C (88.5 °F) on August 10, 2023.

Climate data for Itoigawa, elevation 8 m (26 ft), (1991−2020 normals, extremes 1978−present)
| Month | Jan | Feb | Mar | Apr | May | Jun | Jul | Aug | Sep | Oct | Nov | Dec | Year |
|---|---|---|---|---|---|---|---|---|---|---|---|---|---|
| Record high °C (°F) | 17.5 (63.5) | 23.6 (74.5) | 28.4 (83.1) | 30.7 (87.3) | 31.8 (89.2) | 36.8 (98.2) | 37.2 (99.0) | 39.3 (102.7) | 37.6 (99.7) | 35.1 (95.2) | 28.1 (82.6) | 26.0 (78.8) | 39.3 (102.7) |
| Mean daily maximum °C (°F) | 7.0 (44.6) | 7.4 (45.3) | 10.9 (51.6) | 16.3 (61.3) | 21.2 (70.2) | 23.4 (74.1) | 28.5 (83.3) | 30.3 (86.5) | 26.6 (79.9) | 21.3 (70.3) | 15.7 (60.3) | 10.2 (50.4) | 18.3 (64.9) |
| Daily mean °C (°F) | 3.6 (38.5) | 3.8 (38.8) | 6.7 (44.1) | 11.8 (53.2) | 16.8 (62.2) | 20.7 (69.3) | 25.0 (77.0) | 26.6 (79.9) | 22.8 (73.0) | 17.3 (63.1) | 11.6 (52.9) | 6.5 (43.7) | 14.4 (57.9) |
| Mean daily minimum °C (°F) | 0.9 (33.6) | 0.7 (33.3) | 2.9 (37.2) | 7.6 (45.7) | 12.9 (55.2) | 17.7 (63.9) | 22.3 (72.1) | 23.6 (74.5) | 19.7 (67.5) | 14.0 (57.2) | 8.2 (46.8) | 3.4 (38.1) | 11.2 (52.2) |
| Record low °C (°F) | −5.3 (22.5) | −5.2 (22.6) | −3.1 (26.4) | −1.3 (29.7) | 5.1 (41.2) | 10.7 (51.3) | 15.4 (59.7) | 17.2 (63.0) | 11.4 (52.5) | 4.8 (40.6) | 0.8 (33.4) | −4.2 (24.4) | −5.3 (22.5) |
| Average precipitation mm (inches) | 354.8 (13.97) | 225.5 (8.88) | 204.5 (8.05) | 135.1 (5.32) | 120.5 (4.74) | 168.0 (6.61) | 237.8 (9.36) | 223.3 (8.79) | 251.4 (9.90) | 232.4 (9.15) | 341.0 (13.43) | 407.4 (16.04) | 2,901.5 (114.23) |
| Average precipitation days (≥ 1.0 mm) | 24.8 | 19.8 | 18.9 | 13.2 | 11.4 | 11.8 | 14.2 | 11.7 | 14.0 | 15.2 | 19.1 | 23.4 | 197.5 |
| Mean monthly sunshine hours | 52.9 | 85.2 | 135.4 | 178.8 | 205.3 | 160.4 | 159.2 | 195.2 | 138.9 | 133.9 | 99.7 | 66.6 | 1,611.5 |
Source 1: 理科年表
Source 2: Japan Meteorological Agency

== Demographics ==
Per Japanese census data, the population of Itoigawa has declined steadily over the past 70 years and is now less than it was a century ago.

Historical population
| Year | Pop. | ±% |
|---|---|---|
| 1920 | 58,580 | — |
| 1930 | 63,103 | +7.7% |
| 1940 | 64,019 | +1.5% |
| 1950 | 78,727 | +23.0% |
| 1960 | 77,641 | −1.4% |
| 1970 | 67,785 | −12.7% |
| 1980 | 61,488 | −9.3% |
| 1990 | 56,803 | −7.6% |
| 2000 | 53,021 | −6.7% |
| 2010 | 47,702 | −10.0% |
| 2020 | 40,765 | −14.5% |

== History ==
The area of present-day Itoigawa was part of ancient Echigo Province. Historically, Itoigawa lies at the end of the shio no michi (salt road) that supplied salt from the Sea of Japan to Edo via Shinano Province. During the Edo period, Itoigawa was the castle town for Itoigawa Domain. After the Meiji restoration, with the establishment of the modern municipalities system on April 1, 1889, Itoigawa became a town within Nishikubiki District, Niigata.

The modern city was created on June 1, 1954 when the former town of Itoigawa absorbed the villages of Uramoto, Shimohayakawa, Kamihayakawa, Yamatogawa, Saikai, Ōno (Daino), Nechi and Kotati (Otaki) to elevate city status. On April 1, 2005, the towns of Nō and Ōmi (both from Nishikubiki District) were merged into Itoigawa.

=== Oldest known jadeite-using culture ===
A great many jadeite beads and axe heads as well as the remains of jadeite workshops from the Neolithic era have been uncovered in Itoigawa. These beads and axes were traded throughout Japan and the Korean Peninsula and were produced by the world's oldest known jadeite-using culture, centered on the Itoigawa region.

== Government ==
Itoigawa has a mayor-council form of government with a directly elected mayor and a unicameral city legislature of 20 members. Itoigawa contributes one member to the Niigata Prefectural Assembly. In terms of national politics, the city is part of Niigata 6th district of the lower house of the Diet of Japan.

== Economy ==
Commercial fishing and the production of limestone and cement are the mainstays of the local economy.

== Education ==
Itoigawa has 14 public elementary schools and four public middle schools operated by the city government, and three public high schools operated by the Niigata Prefectural Bureau of Education. The city and prefecture also operate one special education school each for the handicapped.

== Transportation ==
=== Railway ===
– Hokuriku Shinkansen

- Itoigawa

JR West - Ōito Line

- Hiraiwa - Kotaki - Nechi - Kubiki-Ōno - Himekawa - Itoigawa

Echigo Tokimeki Railway - Nihonkai Hisui Line

- Ichiburi - Oyashirazu - Ōmi - Itoigawa - Kajiyashiki - Uramoto - Nō - Tsutsuishi

Ainokaze Toyama Railway

- Ichiburi

=== Highway ===
- Hokuriku Expressway – Oyashirazu IC, Itoigawa IC, Nō IC
- National Route 49
- National Route 290
- National Route 8
- National Route 148

== Local attractions ==
- The entire territory of Itoigawa is "Itoigawa Global Geopark" which is a member of the Japanese Geoparks Network and Global Geoparks Network on account of its outstanding geological heritage, educational programs and projects, and promotion of geotourism.
- The city is known for its distinctive black-colored yakisoba.
- Itoigawa is also known for its unique bugaku, a variety of traditional Japanese performance art. Itoigawa Bugaku can be seen at festivals taking place at Hakusan Shrine and Amatsu Shrine, and has been nationally designated as an Important Intangible Cultural Asset.

=== National Historic Sites ===
- Chōjagahara Site, Jōmon period archaeological site
- Matsumoto Kaidō, ancient highway
- Terachi Site, Jōmon period archaeological site

== Notable people from Itoigawa ==
- Hideki Hosaka, Japanese professional wrestler (known for his work in Frontier Martial-Arts Wrestling, All Japan Pro Wrestling, and Pro Wrestling Zero-One)
- The poet Ryōkan (1758-1831) writes that Itoigawa is his former village.
