= Karuisawa-shuku =

Coordinates: 36.3586°N 138.6355°E

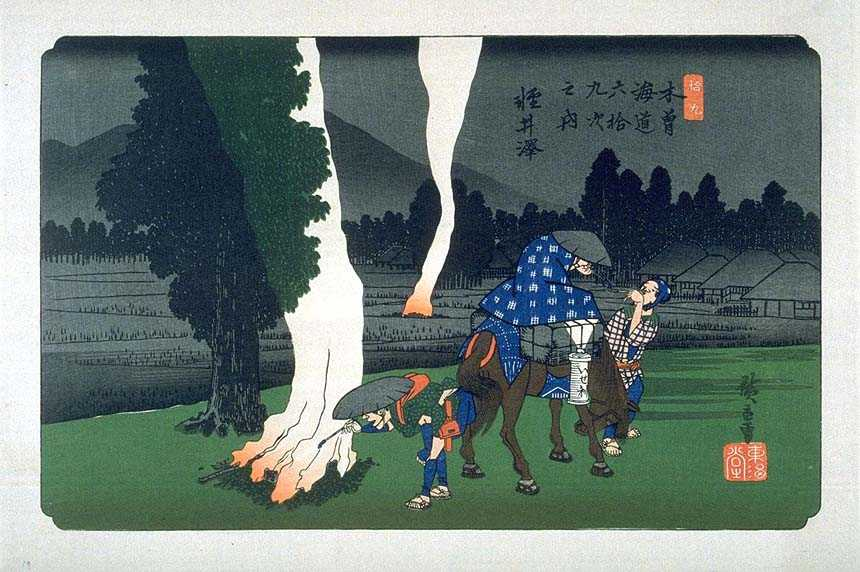
Hiroshige's print of Karuisawa-shuku, part of The Sixty-nine Stations of the Kiso Kaidō series

Karuisawa-shuku (軽井沢宿, Karuisawa-shuku) was the eighteenth of the sixty-nine stations of the Nakasendō. It is located in the northern portion of the present-day town of Karuizawa, in the Kitasaku District of Nagano Prefecture, Japan. Karuisawa-shuku is 10 km (6.2 mi) from the preceding post station, Sakamoto-shuku, and 4 km (2.5 mi) from the following one, Kutsukake-shuku.

== History ==
The place that was originally called Karuisawa is, in actuality, approximately two to three kilometers from the post town, which is located at the western entrance to the Usui Pass. Karuisawa-shuku flourished more than any other post town along the Nakasendō, with five honjin and sub-honjin, in addition to over 100 other structures for travelers. During the Edo period, the post town also employed hundreds of meshimori onna (飯盛女), women who were employed by the Shōgun to serve food to travelers. To the east of the post town, a bridge crossed over the Yakazaki River, where travelers reluctantly parted with the meshimori onna.

From the Meiji period onwards, Karuisawa became a popular place with Western missionaries. It was at this point that the area's name changed from "Karuisawa" to the modern "Karuizawa," which is easier for foreigners to pronounce. Because there was a large number of foreigners in the area, many western-styled structures were also built up, which has resulted in few structures from the past remaining today.

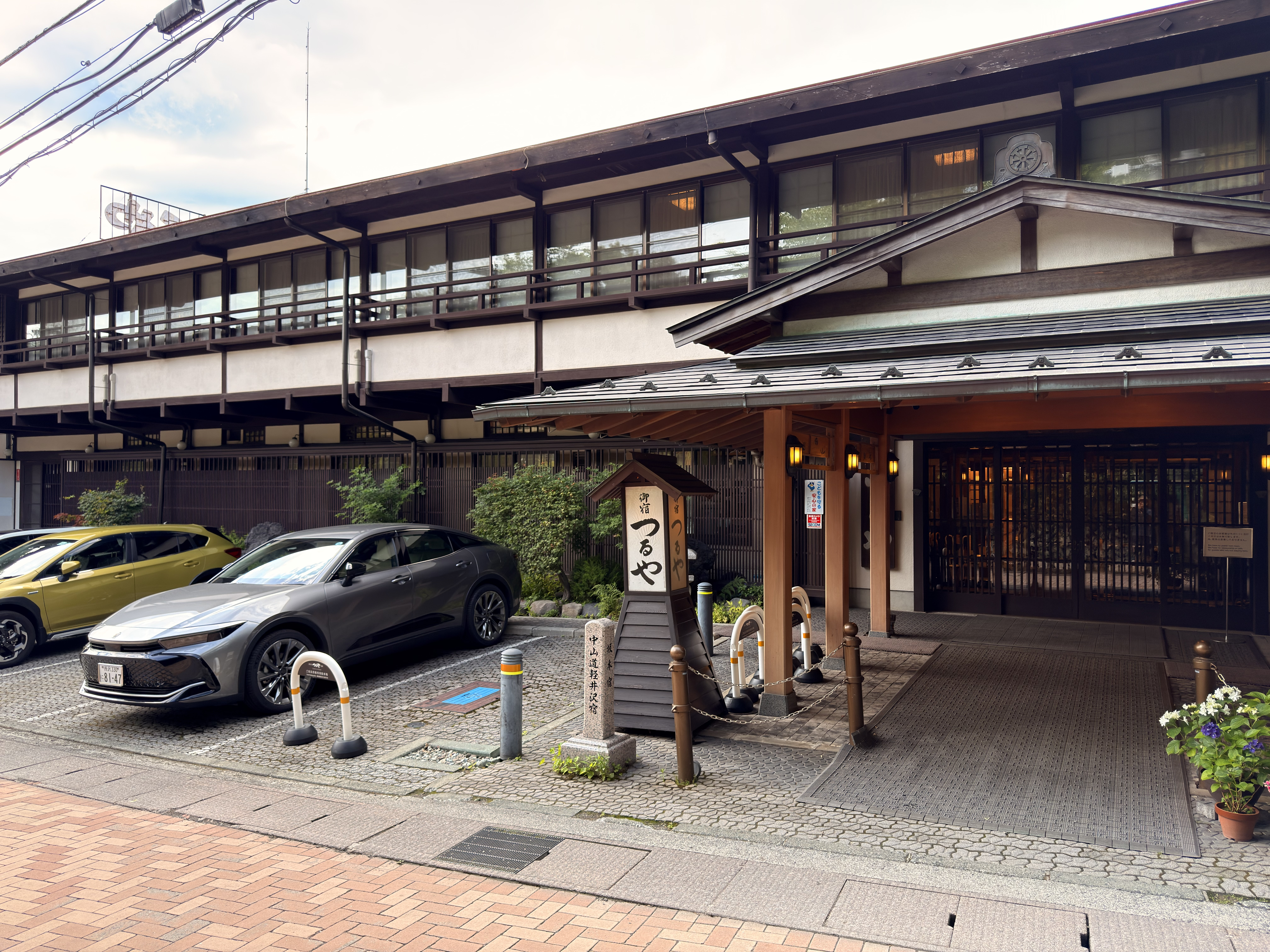
Karuizawa juku post station environs within present day Karuizawa

== Neighboring Post Towns ==
Nakasendō
Sakamoto-shuku - Karuisawa-shuku - Kutsukake-shuku
