= Kita-Otari Station =

Railway station in Otari, Nagano Prefecture, Japan

Coordinates: 36.8427°N 137.9063°E

Kita-Otari Station 北小谷駅
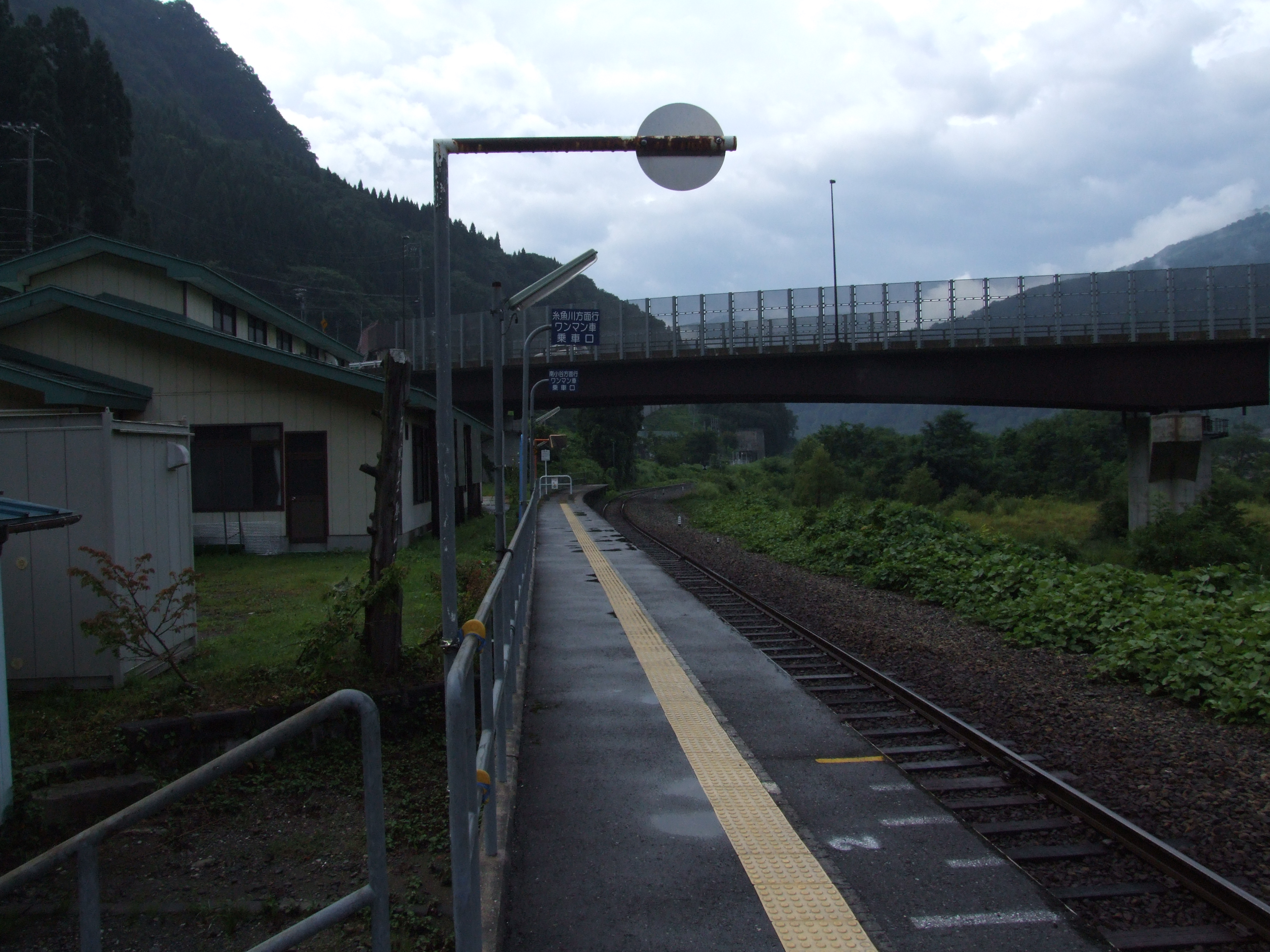
- Kita-Otari Station in May 2009

General information
- Location: 4321 Mukaihira, Kita-Otari Otari-mura, Kitaazumi-gun, Nagano-ken 399-9601; Japan
- Elevation: 400.0 m (1,312.3 ft)
- Operator: JR West
- Line: ■ Ōito Line
- Distance: 8.4 km from Minami-Otari
- Platforms: 1 side platform

Other information
- Website: Official website

History
- Opened: 15 August 1957; 69 years ago

Services
Preceding station	JR West	Following station
Hiraiwa towards Itoigawa	Ōito Line	Nakatsuchi towards Minami-Otari
Location
- Location within Japan

Kita-Otari Station (北小谷駅, Kita-Otari-eki) is a railway station on the Ōito Line in Otari, Kitaazumi District, Nagano Prefecture, Japan, operated by West Japan Railway Company (JR West).

== Lines ==
Kita-Otari Station is served by the Ōito Line and is 8.4 kilometers from the Minami-Otari Station, and 78.5 kilometers from the starting point of the line at Matsumoto Station.

== Station layout ==
The station consists of one ground-level side platform serving a single bi-directional track. The station is unattended.

== History ==
Kita-Otari Station opened on 15 August 1957. With the privatization of Japanese National Railways (JNR) on 1 April 1987, the station came under the control of JR West.

== Surrounding area ==
- Raiba Onsen
- National Route 148

== See also ==
- List of railway stations in Japan
