= Sakamoto-shuku =

Coordinates: 36.3498°N 138.7175°E

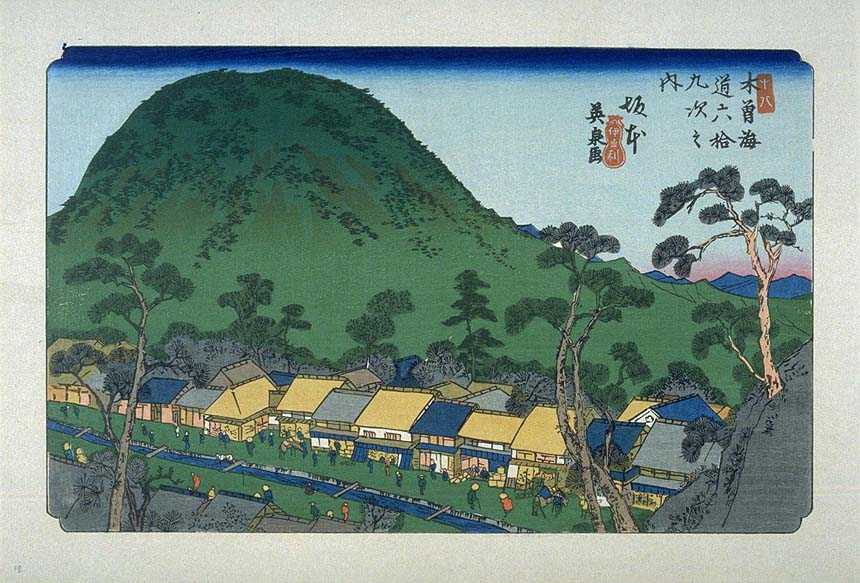
Keisai Eisen's print of Sakamoto-shuku, part of The Sixty-nine Stations of the Kiso Kaidō series

Sakamoto-shuku (坂本宿, Sakamoto-shuku) was the seventeenth of the sixty-nine stations of the Nakasendō. It is located in the present-day city of Annaka, Gunma Prefecture, Japan.

== History ==
Sakamoto-shuku is located at the eastern entrance to the Usui Pass. During the Edo period, there were a total of four honjin and sub-honjin combined. There were an additional 40 other buildings for travelers to use, making it a comparatively large station along the Nakasendō.

== Neighboring post towns ==
Nakasendō
Matsuida-shuku - Sakamoto-shuku - Karuisawa-shuku
