= Nechi Station =

Railway station in Itoigawa, Niigata Prefecture, Japan

Nechi Station 根知駅
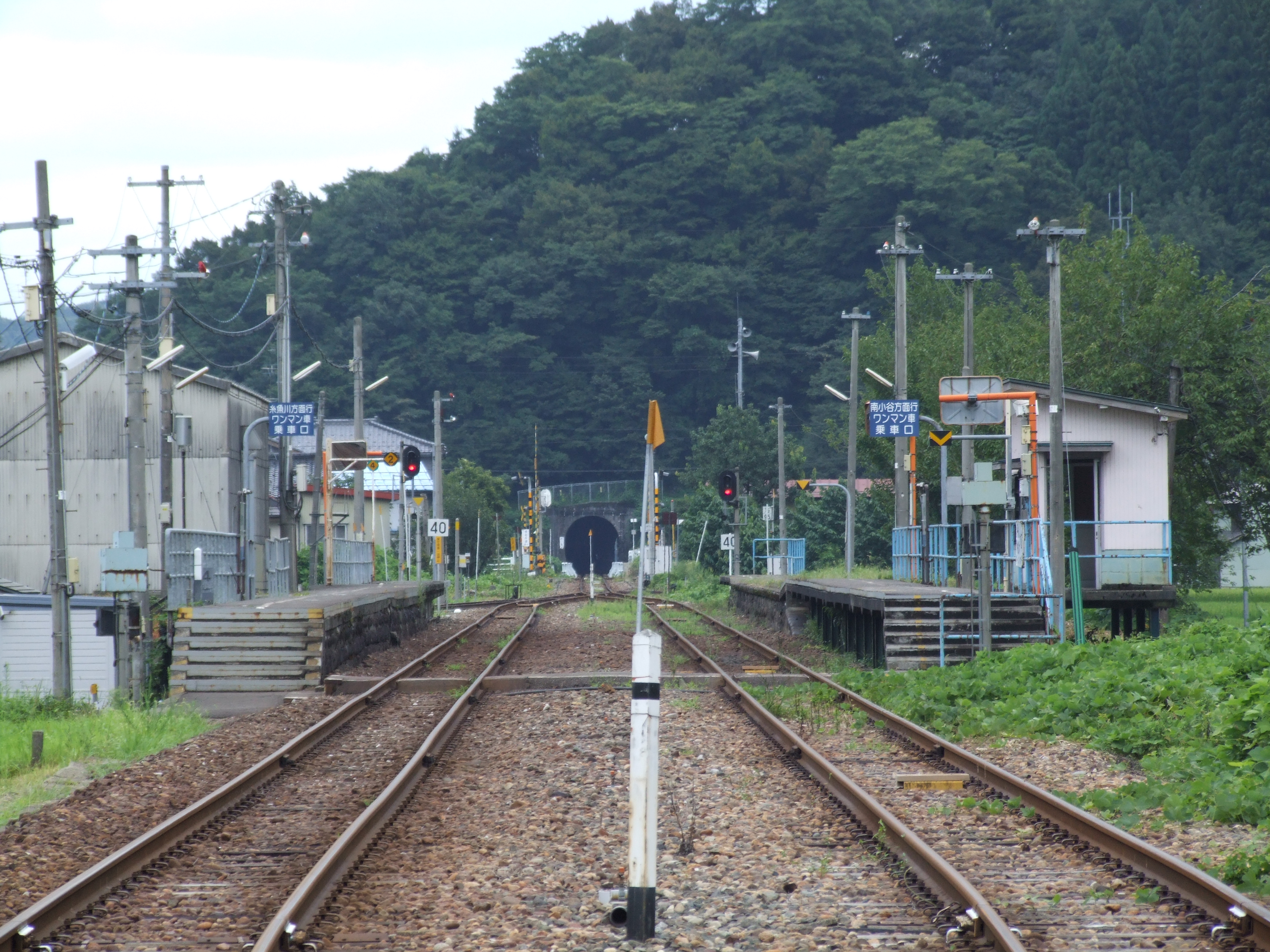
- Nechi Station, August 2006

General information
- Location: Negoya, Itoigawa-shi, Niigata-ken 949-0536; Japan
- Coordinates: 36.9665°N 137.8668°E
- Elevation: 90 m (300 ft)
- Operator: JR West
- Line: ■ Ōito Line
- Distance: 95.4 km from Matsumoto
- Platforms: 2 side platforms
- Tracks: 2

Other information
- Status: Unstaffed
- Website: Official website

History
- Opened: 14 November 1934; 91 years ago

Passengers
- 6 (FY2016)

Services
Preceding station	JR West	Following station
Kubiki-Ōno towards Itoigawa	Ōito Line	Kotaki towards Minami-Otari
Location
- Location within Japan

Nechi Station (根知駅, Nechi-eki) is a railway station in the city of Itoigawa, Niigata, Japan, operated by West Japan Railway Company (JR West).

== Lines ==
Nechi Station is served by the Ōito Line and is 25.3 kilometers from the intermediate terminus of the line at Minami-Otari Station, and is 95.4 kilometers from the terminus of the line at Matsumoto Station.

== Station layout ==
The station consists of two ground-level opposed side platforms connected by a level crossing, serving two tracks. The station is unattended.

=== Platforms ===
1	■ Ōito Line	for Itoigawa
2	■ Ōito Line	for Minami-Otari

== History ==
Nechi Station opened on 14 November 1934. With the privatization of Japanese National Railways (JNR) on 1 April 1987, the station came under the control of JR West.

== Passenger statistics ==
In fiscal 2016, the station was used by an average of 6 passengers daily (boarding passengers only).

== Surrounding area ==
- Amegazari Onsen
- Shio-no-michi Museum

== See also ==
- List of railway stations in Japan
