= Kotaki Station =

Railway station in Itoigawa, Niigata Prefecture, Japan

Kotaki Station 小滝駅
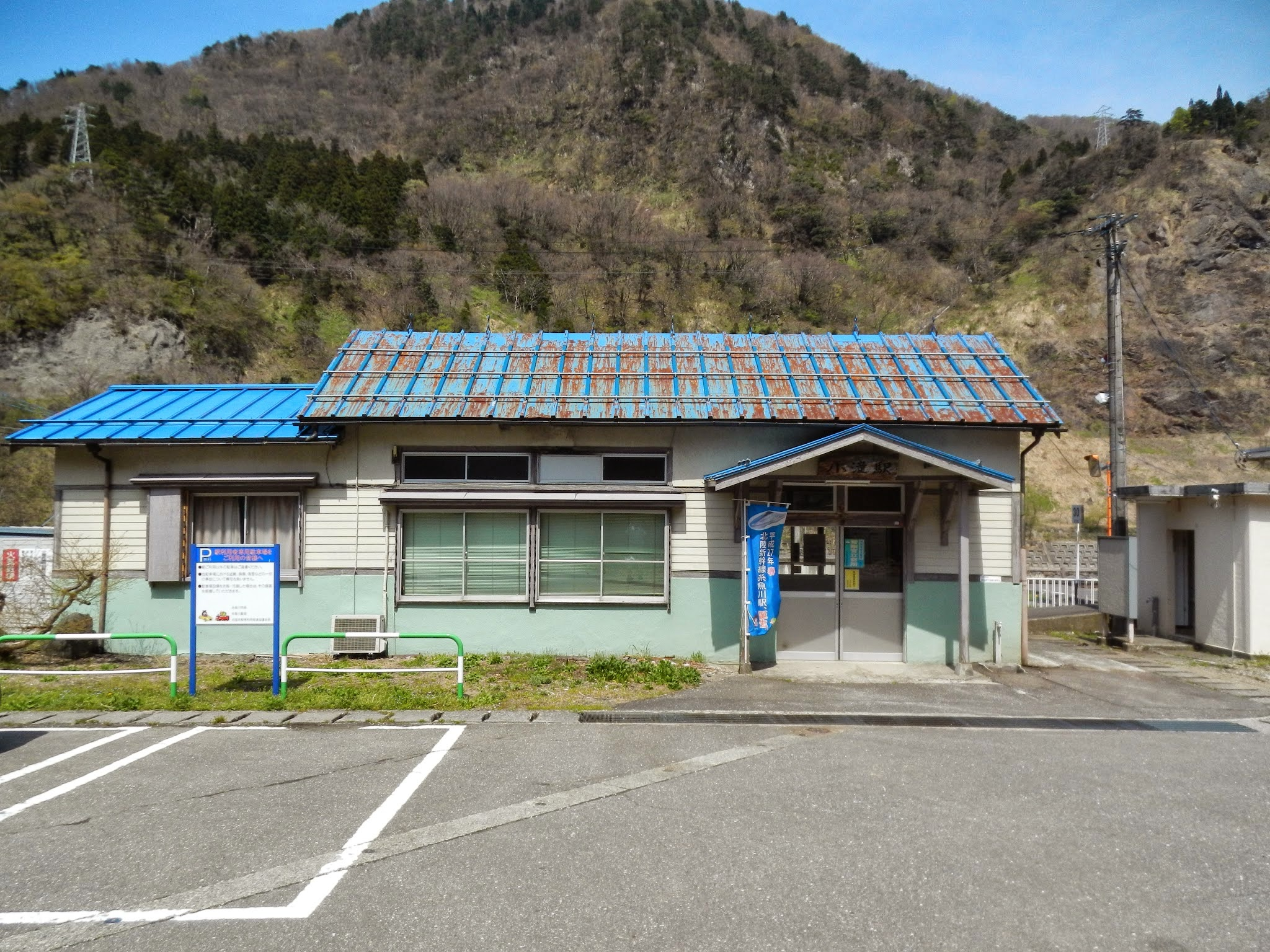
- Kotaki Station

General information
- Location: Kotaki, Itoigawa-shi, Niigata-ken 949-0462; Japan
- Coordinates: 36.9381°N 137.8592°E
- Elevation: 134 m (440 ft)
- Operator: JR West
- Line: ■ Ōito Line
- Distance: 91.8 km from Matsumoto
- Platforms: 1 island platform
- Tracks: 2

Other information
- Status: Unstaffed
- Website: Official website

History
- Opened: 24 December 1935; 90 years ago

Passengers
- 3 (FY2016)

Services
Preceding station	JR West	Following station
Nechi towards Itoigawa	Ōito Line	Hiraiwa towards Minami-Otari
Location
- Location within Japan

Kotaki Station (小滝駅, Kotaki-eki) is a railway station in Itoigawa, Niigata, Japan, operated by West Japan Railway Company (JR West).

== Lines ==
Kotaki Station is served by the Ōito Line and is 21.7 kilometers from the intermediate terminus of the line at Minami-Otari Station, and is 91.8 kilometers from the terminus of the line at Matsumoto Station.

== Station layout ==
The station consists of one ground-level island platform serving two tracks, connected to the station building by a level crossing. The station is unattended.

=== Platforms ===
■ Ōito Line	for Itoigawa
■ Ōito Line	for Minami-Otari

== History ==
Kotaki Station opened on 24 December 1935. With the privatization of Japanese National Railways (JNR) on 1 April 1987, the station came under the control of JR West.

== Passenger statistics ==
In fiscal 2016, the station was used by an average of 3 passengers daily (boarding passengers only).

== Surrounding area ==
- Himekawa No.6 Hydroelectric Power Plant

== See also ==
- List of railway stations in Japan
