= Himekawa Station (Niigata) =

Railway station in Itoigawa, Niigata Prefecture, Japan

Himekawa Station 姫川駅
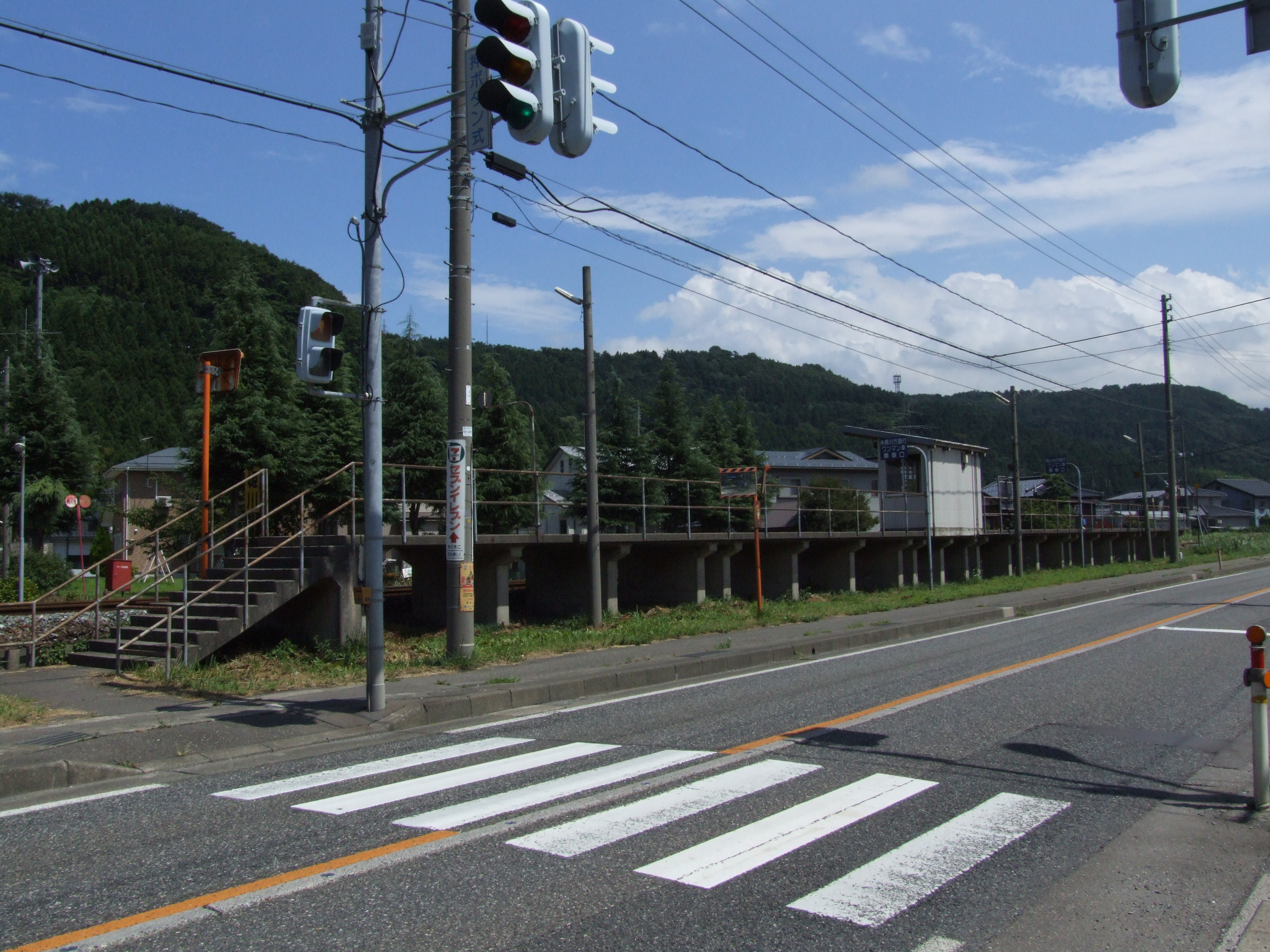
- Himekawa Station, August 2008

General information
- Location: Ono, Itoigawa-shi, Niigata-ken 941-0071; Japan
- Coordinates: 37°01′13″N 137°51′39″E
- Operator: JR West
- Line: ■ Ōito Line
- Distance: 102.2 km from Matsumoto
- Platforms: 1 side platform
- Tracks: 1

Other information
- Status: Unstaffed
- Website: Official website

History
- Opened: 1 November 1986; 39 years ago

Passengers
- 3 (FY2016)

Services
Preceding station	JR West	Following station
Itoigawa Terminus	Ōito Line	Kubiki-Ōno towards Minami-Otari
Location
- Location within Japan

Himekawa Station (姫川駅, Himekawa-eki) is a railway station in the city of Itoigawa, Niigata, Japan, operated by West Japan Railway Company (JR West).

== Lines ==
Himekawa Station is served by the Ōito Line and is 32.2 kilometers from the intermediate terminus of the line at Minami-Otari Station, and is 102.2 kilometers from the terminus of the line at Matsumoto Station.

== Station layout ==
The station consists of one ground-level side platform serving a single bi-directional track. There is no station building, and the station is unattended.

== History ==
Himekawa Station opened on 1 November 1986. With the privatization of Japanese National Railways (JNR) on 1 April 1987, the station came under the control of JR West.

== Passenger statistics ==
In fiscal 2016, the station was used by an average of 3 passengers daily (boarding passengers only).

== Surrounding area ==
- Himekawa Housing Area

== See also ==
- List of railway stations in Japan
