= Hiraiwa Station =

Railway station in Itoigawa, Niigata Prefecture, Japan

Hiraiwa Station 平岩駅
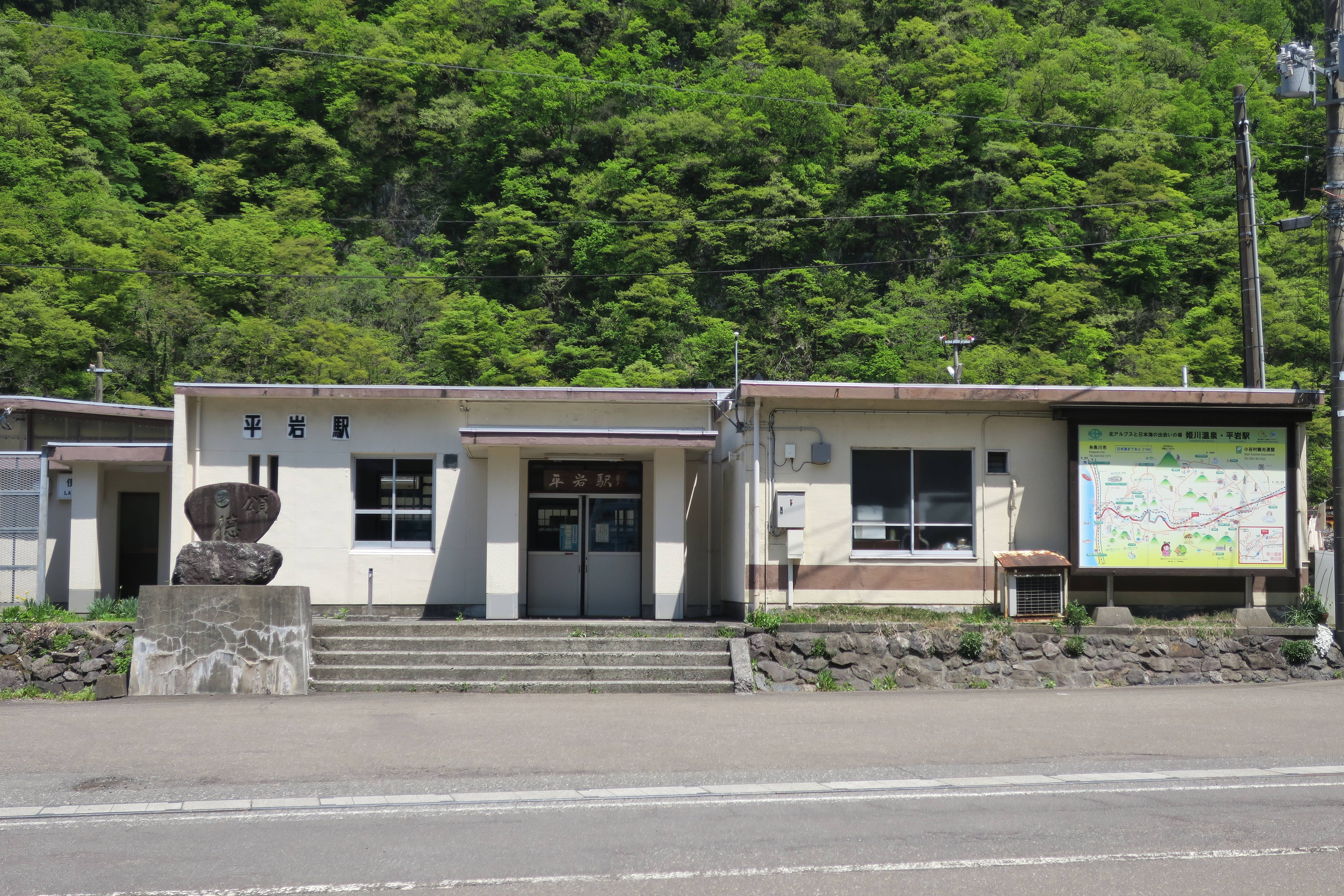
- Hiraiwa Station, May 2022

General information
- Location: Daisho, Itoigawa-shi, Niigata-ken e 949-0464; Japan
- Coordinates: 36.8871°N 137.8656°E
- Elevation: 264.2 m (867 ft)
- Operator: JR West
- Line: ■ Ōito Line
- Distance: 85.0 km from Matsumoto
- Platforms: 1 side platform
- Tracks: 1

Other information
- Status: Unstaffed
- Website: Official website

History
- Opened: 15 August 1957; 69 years ago

Passengers
- 5 (FY2016)

Services
Preceding station	JR West	Following station
Kotaki towards Itoigawa	Ōito Line	Kita-Otari towards Minami-Otari
Location
- Location within Japan

Hiraiwa Station (平岩駅, Hiraiwa-eki) is a railway station in Itoigawa, Niigata, Japan, operated by West Japan Railway Company (JR West).

== Lines ==
Hiraiwa Station is served by the Ōito Line and is 14.9 kilometers from the intermediate terminus of the line at Minami-Otari Station, and is 85.0 kilometers from the terminus of the line at Matsumoto Station.

== Station layout ==
The station consists of one ground-level side platform serving a single bi-directional track, connected to the station building by a level crossing. The station is unattended.

== History ==
Hiraiwa Station opened on 15 August 1957. With the privatization of Japanese National Railways (JNR) on 1 April 1987, the station came under the control of JR West.

== Passenger statistics ==
In fiscal 2016, the station was used by an average of 5 passengers daily (boarding passengers only).

== Surrounding area ==
- Himekawa Onsen

== See also ==
- List of railway stations in Japan
