= Himekawa Dam =

Coordinates: 36°43′08″N 137°53′04″E

Himekawa Dam No. 2
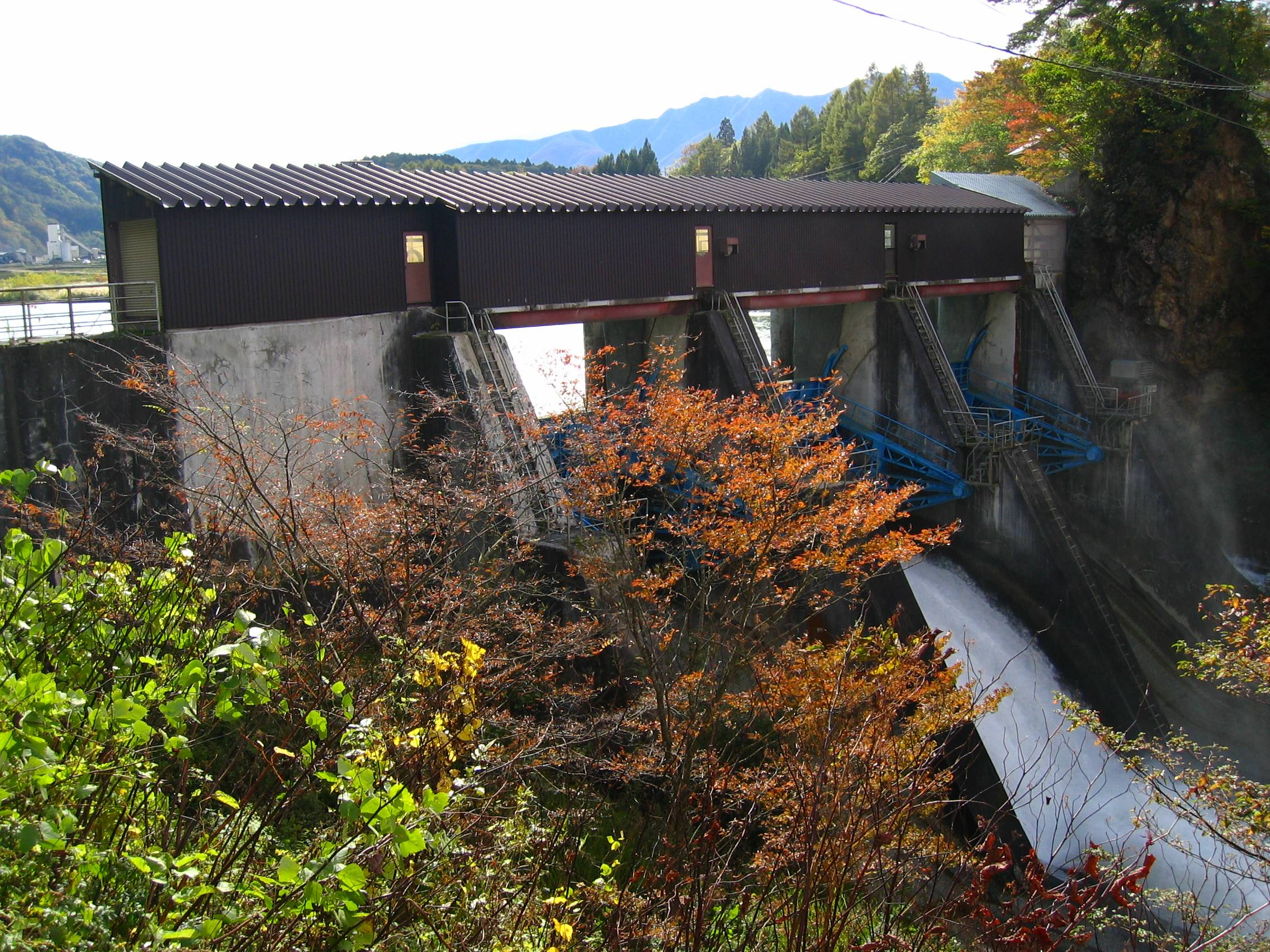
- Interactive map of Himekawa Dam No. 2
- Official name: 姫川第二ダム
- Location: Hakuba, Nagano, Japan
- Opening date: 1935

Dam and spillways
- Type of dam: Concrete gravity dam
- Impounds: Hime River

Himekawa Dam No. 2 (姫川第二ダム, Himekawa Daini damu) is a dam in Hakuba, Nagano Prefecture, Japan.
