= Karuizawa, Nagano =

Karuizawa 軽井沢町
- Town
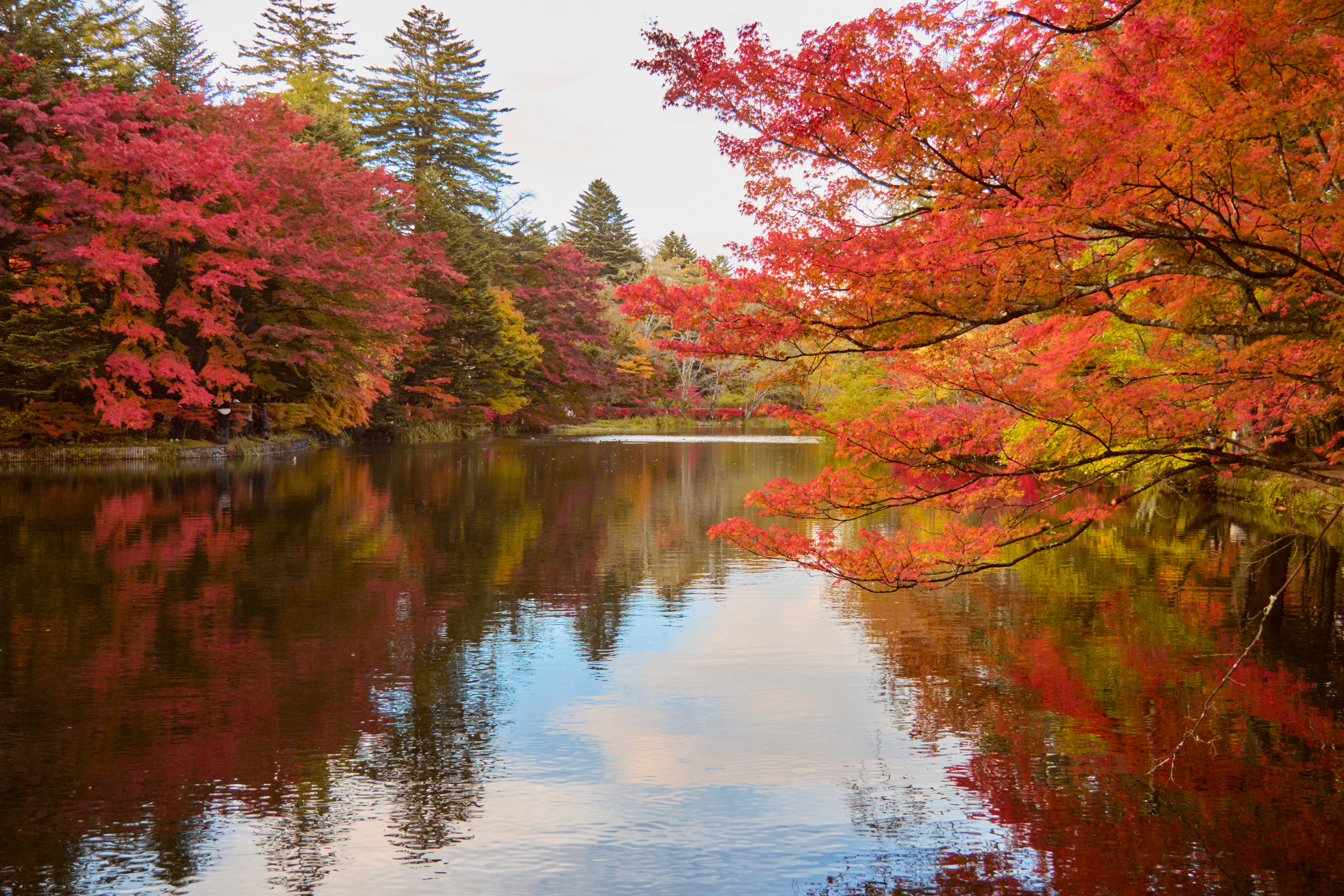
- Kumoba Pond, Karuizawa in autumn

- Flag Emblem

- Location of Karuizawa in Nagano Prefecture

- Karuizawa (Central Japan) Karuizawa (Nagano Prefecture)
- Coordinates: 36°20′55″N 138°35′49″E
- Country: Japan
- Region: Chūbu (Kōshin'etsu)
- Prefecture: Nagano
- District: Kitasaku

Area
  - Total: 156.03 km^{2} (60.24 sq mi)

Population (As of 1 October 2025)
  - Total: 21,834
  - Density: 139.93/km^{2} (362.43/sq mi)
- Time zone: UTC+9 (Japan Standard Time)
- Phone number: 0267-45-8111
- Address: 2381-1 Nagakura, Karuizawa-machi, Kitasaku-gun, Nagano-ken 389-0192
- Climate: Dfb
- Website: Official website
- Symbols
- Bird: Brown-headed thrush
- Flower: Sakurasō (Primula sieboldii)
- Tree: Magnolia kobus

Karuizawa (軽井沢町, Karuizawa-machi) is a resort town in Nagano Prefecture, Japan. As of 1 October 2025, it had an estimated population of 21,834 in 11,285 households, and a population density of 139 persons per km^{2}. The total area of the town is 156.03 km^{2} (60.24 sq mi).

Originally, there was a stage station (shukuba) called Karuisawa-shuku on the Nakasendō. The Shin'etsu Line opened in 1888 and the town became popular as a Western-style hill station around that time.

== Geography ==
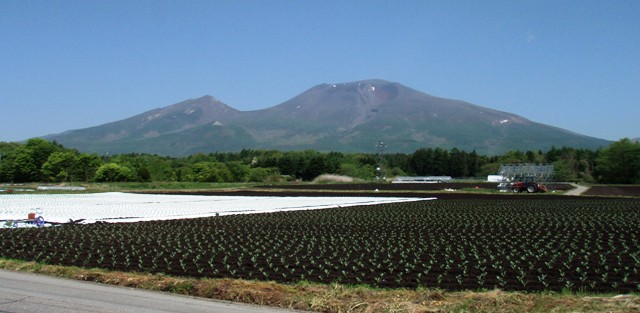
Mount Asama seen from Karuizawa

Karuizawa is located in eastern Nagano Prefecture, bordered by Gunma Prefecture to the north, east and south. The town is located on an elevated plain at the foot of Mount Asama, one of Japan's most active volcanoes. The mountain is classed as a Category A active volcano. A small eruption was detected in June 2015, and a more significant eruption spewing hot rocks and a plume of ash occurred in February 2015. Mount Asama's most destructive eruption in recent recorded history took place in 1783, when over 1,000 were killed. The volcano is actively monitored by scientists and climbing close to the summit is prohibited.

- Usui Pass
- Highest elevation: 2,568 m (8,425 ft) (Top of Mount Asama)
- Lowest elevation: 798.7 m (2,620.4 ft)

=== Surrounding municipalities ===
- Gunma Prefecture
  - Annaka
  - Naganohara
  - Shimonita
  - Takasaki
  - Tsumagoi
- Nagano Prefecture
  - Miyota
  - Saku

== Climate ==
Karuizawa has a humid continental climate (Köppen climate classification Dfb) with warm summers and cold winters. The average annual temperature in Karuizawa is 8.6 °C (47.5 °F). The average annual rainfall is 1,246.2 mm (49.06 in) with September as the wettest month. The temperatures are highest on average in August, at around 20.8 °C (69.4 °F), and lowest in January, at around −3.3 °C (26.1 °F). Precipitation is much heavier in the summer than in the winter.

Climate data for Karuizawa (1991–2020 normals, extremes 1925–present)
Month	Jan	Feb	Mar	Apr	May	Jun	Jul	Aug	Sep	Oct	Nov	Dec	Year
Record high °C (°F)	16.1 (61.0)	18.8 (65.8)	22.6 (72.7)	28.3 (82.9)	29.5 (85.1)	32.1 (89.8)	34.2 (93.6)	33.9 (93.0)	31.3 (88.3)	27.7 (81.9)	23.3 (73.9)	20.7 (69.3)	34.2 (93.6)
Mean daily maximum °C (°F)	2.3 (36.1)	3.5 (38.3)	7.8 (46.0)	14.3 (57.7)	19.2 (66.6)	21.5 (70.7)	25.3 (77.5)	26.3 (79.3)	21.7 (71.1)	16.2 (61.2)	11.2 (52.2)	5.3 (41.5)	14.6 (58.3)
Daily mean °C (°F)	−3.3 (26.1)	−2.6 (27.3)	1.1 (34.0)	7.0 (44.6)	12.3 (54.1)	16.0 (60.8)	20.1 (68.2)	20.8 (69.4)	16.7 (62.1)	10.5 (50.9)	4.8 (40.6)	−0.5 (31.1)	8.6 (47.5)
Mean daily minimum °C (°F)	−8.2 (17.2)	−8.0 (17.6)	−4.5 (23.9)	0.6 (33.1)	6.3 (43.3)	11.8 (53.2)	16.4 (61.5)	17.1 (62.8)	13.0 (55.4)	6.3 (43.3)	−0.2 (31.6)	−5.3 (22.5)	3.8 (38.8)
Record low °C (°F)	−20.3 (−4.5)	−19.6 (−3.3)	−21.0 (−5.8)	−11.6 (11.1)	−6.1 (21.0)	−0.9 (30.4)	5.0 (41.0)	7.0 (44.6)	−0.2 (31.6)	−6.5 (20.3)	−11.8 (10.8)	−18.0 (−0.4)	−21.0 (−5.8)
Average precipitation mm (inches)	36.8 (1.45)	36.8 (1.45)	68.3 (2.69)	81.0 (3.19)	108.8 (4.28)	154.6 (6.09)	191.8 (7.55)	141.6 (5.57)	193.5 (7.62)	151.1 (5.95)	52.5 (2.07)	29.6 (1.17)	1,246.2 (49.06)
Average snowfall cm (inches)	44 (17)	38 (15)	33 (13)	5 (2.0)	0 (0)	0 (0)	0 (0)	0 (0)	0 (0)	0 (0)	1 (0.4)	19 (7.5)	141 (56)
Average precipitation days (≥ 0.5 mm)	6.8	6.8	9.8	10.3	11.3	14.7	17.0	13.1	13.2	10.4	6.8	6.3	126.5
Average snowy days	20.2	17.5	15.4	4.8	0.0	0.0	0.0	0.0	0.0	0.1	3.2	15.7	75.8
Average relative humidity (%)	76	74	72	70	75	85	87	87	89	87	80	78	80
Mean monthly sunshine hours	181.6	191.8	194.8	204.6	198.5	144.8	138.6	162.7	126.6	140.3	162.5	171.9	2,022
Source: Japan Meteorological Agency (1991–2020 normals, extremes 1925–present)

== History ==
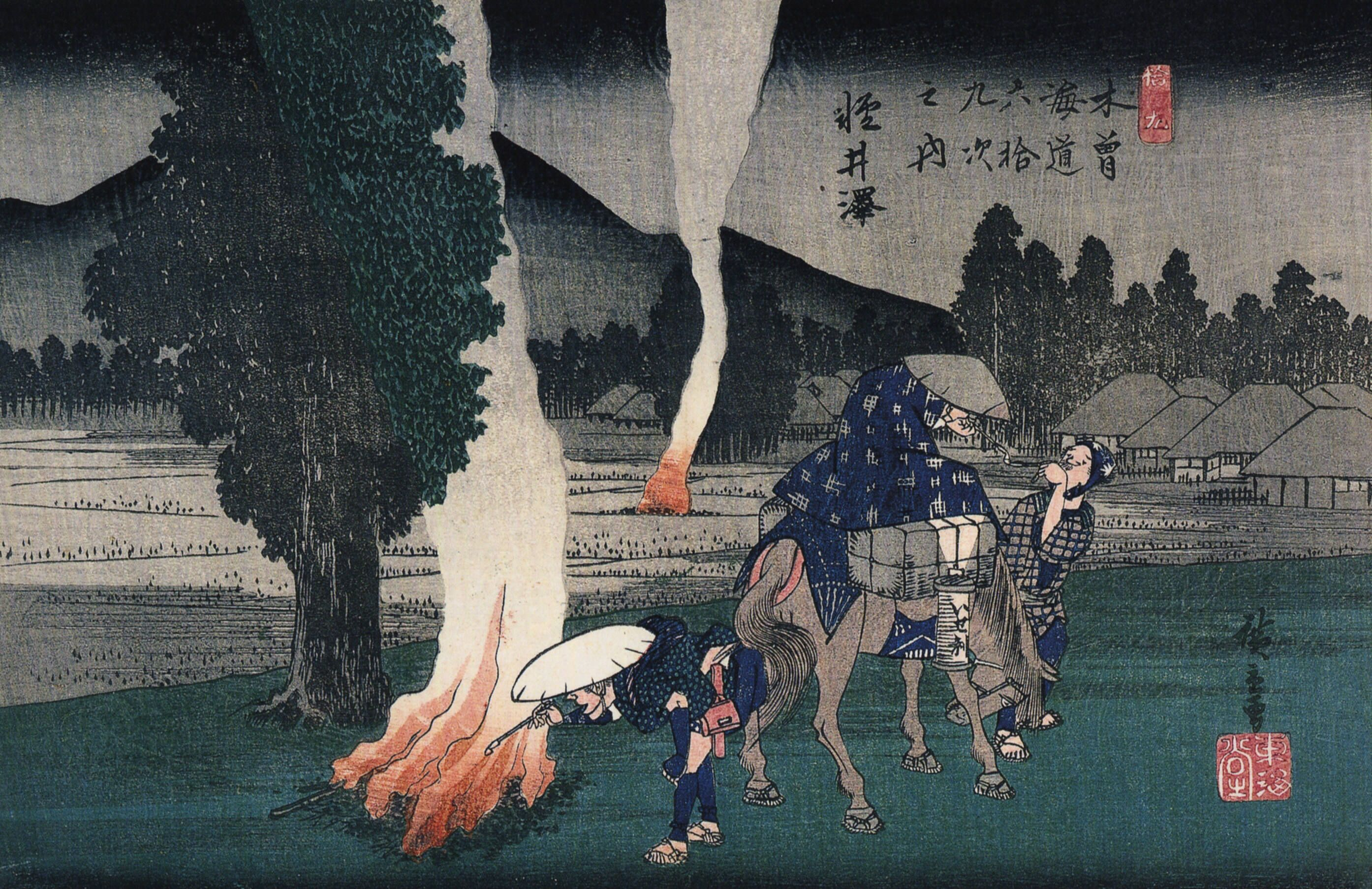
From Hiroshige's series Sixty-nine Stations of the Kisokaido (1834–1842), view 19 and station 18 at Karuisawa

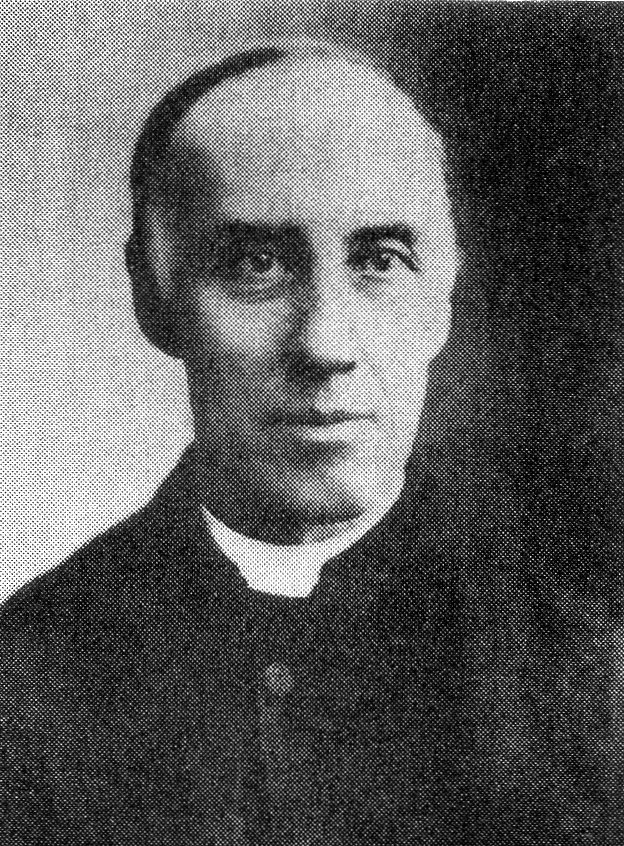
Alexander Croft Shaw

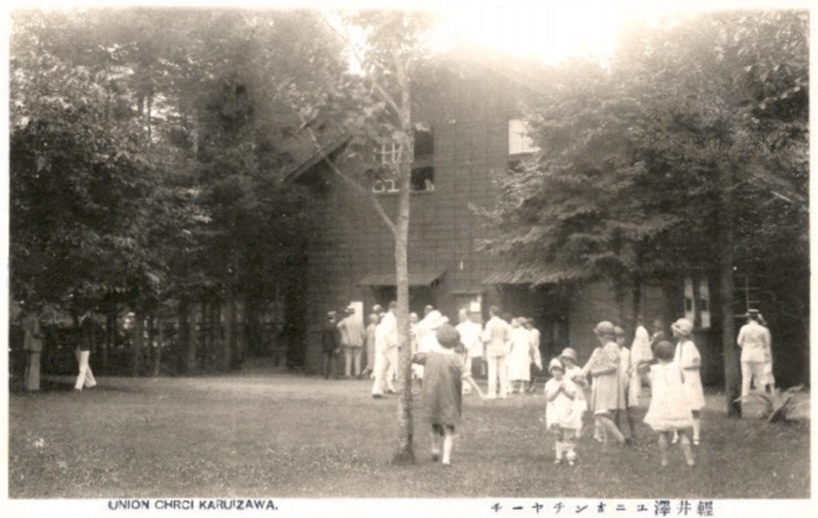
Karuizawa Union Church, before 1945

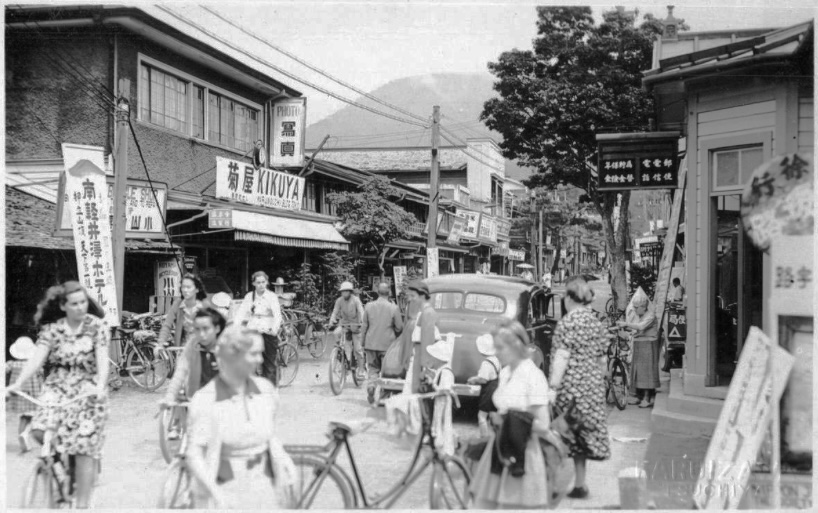
Kyu-Karuizawa Ginza (Main Street), 1930s

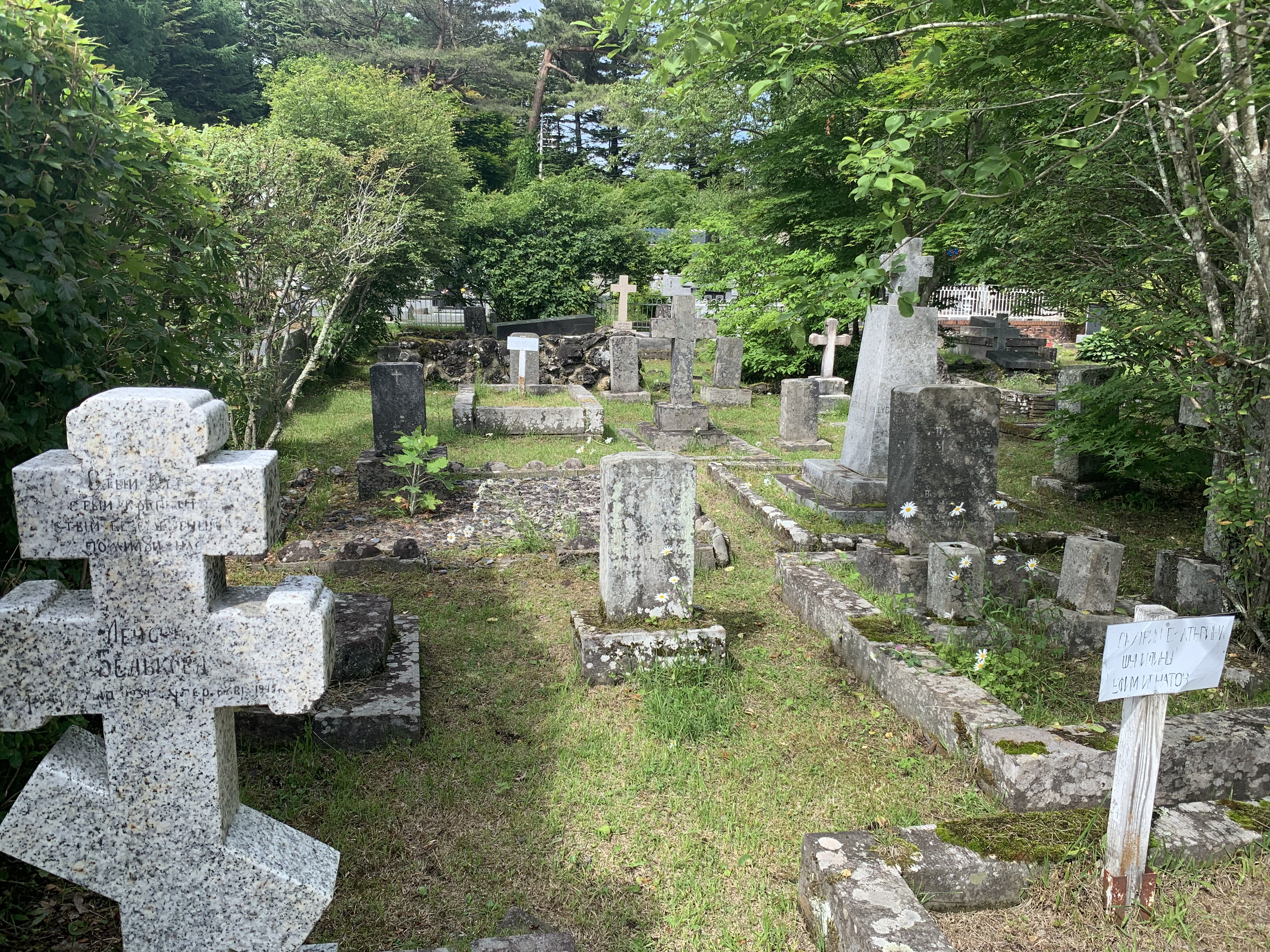
Karuizawa Foreigner's Cemetery

The area of present-day Karuizawa was part of ancient Shinano Province, and developed as Karuisawa-shuku, a post station on the Nakasendō highway connecting Edo with Kyoto during the Edo period.

- 2 August 1876: The hamlets of Kutsukake, Shiozawanitta, Karijuku, Narusawanitta, and Yui merged to form the village of Nagakura. The village of Hatsuji in Saku District absorbed the hamlet of Matorikaya.
- 14 January 1879: Kitasaku District was created, and the town of Usuitoge, and the villages of Karuizawa, Nagakura, Oiwake were established with Kitasaku District.
- 1886: Canadian Anglican missionary Rev. Alexander Croft Shaw and Tokyo Imperial University English professor James Main Dixon introduced Karuizawa as a summer resort.
- 1 April 1889: With the establishment of the modern municipalities system, the town of Usuitoge, and the villages of Karuizawa, and the areas of the former villages of Kutsukake, Shiozawanitta, and Karijuku from the village of Nagakura merged to form the village of Higashinagakura in Kitasaku District, and the areas of the former villages of Narusawanitta and Yui in the village of Nagakura, and the villages of Hatsuji and Oiwake merged to form the village of Nishinagakura in Kitasaku District.
- 1910s: Begins to attract the attention of other expatriates and Japanese. Specially Germans congregate here, language professors and academics hold annual conferences.
- 1 August 1923: The village of Higashinagakura gains town status to become the town of Karuizawa. (The pre-town areas before gaining the town status is known as Kyu-Karuizawa.)
- 8 May 1942: The village of Nishinagakura is merged into Karuizawa.
- 1942–45: Site of an internment camp for enemy foreigners and diplomats during World War 2
- From 1943 relocation of an increasing number of Germans from Tokyo, which is suffering from US fire bombing. The Supreme Commander for the Allied Powers deported most German nationals in late 1947.
- 1951: Selected as International Cultural and Tourism City
- 1 February 1957: Karuizawa absorbed Serizawa area from the former village of Goga, which was absorbed by the town of Miyota.
- 1 April 1959: The Kajikazawa area of the former village of Oiwake was split off and merged with the town of Miyota.
- 1964: 1964 Summer Olympics (Equestrian)
- February 1972: Asama-Sanso incident; Police besiege communist militants holed up in holiday resort after mass killing and hostage taking.
- 1 October 1997: The Nagano Shinkansen opens, serving Karuizawa.
- 1998: 1998 Winter Olympics (Curling)
- 2004: Mount Asama erupts.
- 2016: The G7 Transport Ministers' Meeting
- 2019: The G20 Energy and Environment Ministers' Meeting
- 2023: G7 Foreign Ministers' Meeting in conjunction with the G7 Summit

== Demographics ==
Per Japanese census data, the population of Karuizawa has been increasing over the past 60 years.

Historical population
Year	Pop.	±%
1940	8,746	—
1950	13,676	+56.4%
1960	13,299	−2.8%
1970	13,373	+0.6%
1980	14,195	+6.1%
1990	15,464	+8.9%
2000	16,181	+4.6%
2010	19,023	+17.6%
2020	19,188	+0.9%

== Economy ==
Since one of the origins of the Seibu Group is in Karuizawa (see also Yasujiro Tsutsumi), Seibu is still developing big businesses in this town such as Prince Hotels. Hoshino Resorts is headquartered in Karuizawa.

== Education ==
Karuizawa has three public elementary school and one public middle school operated by the town government, and one public high school is operated by the Nagano Prefectural Board of Education. The UWC ISAK Japan international school is also located in the town.

== Transportation ==
=== Railway ===
- East Japan Railway Company – Hokuriku Shinkansen
  - Karuizawa
- Shinano Railway
  - Karuizawa – Naka-Karuizawa – Shinano-Oiwake

=== Highway ===
- Jōshin-etsu Expressway
- National Route 18
- National Route 146

== International relations ==
- Campos do Jordão, Brazil
- Whistler, British Columbia, Canada

== Local attractions ==
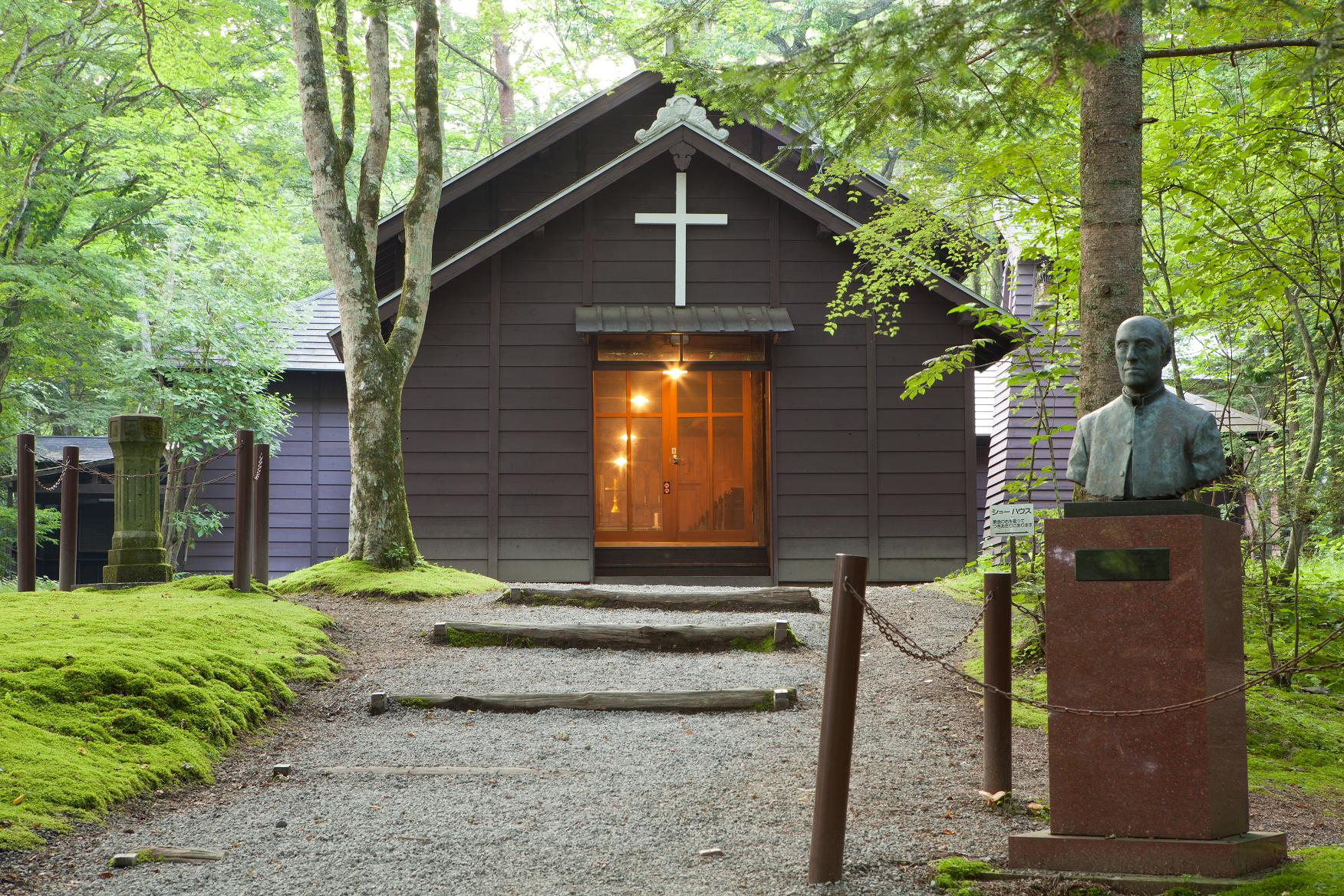
Shaw Memorial Church

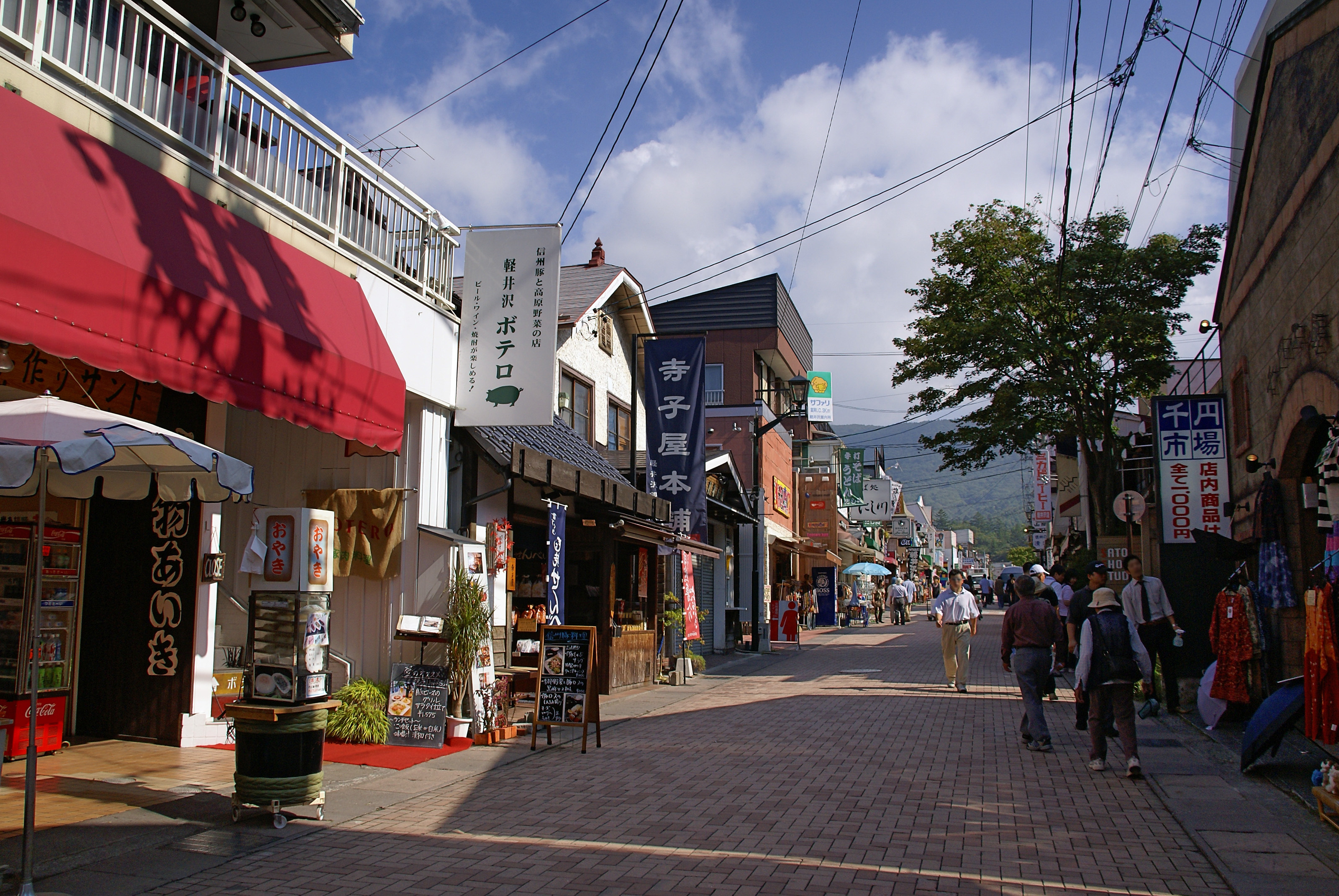
Kyu-Karuizawa Ginza

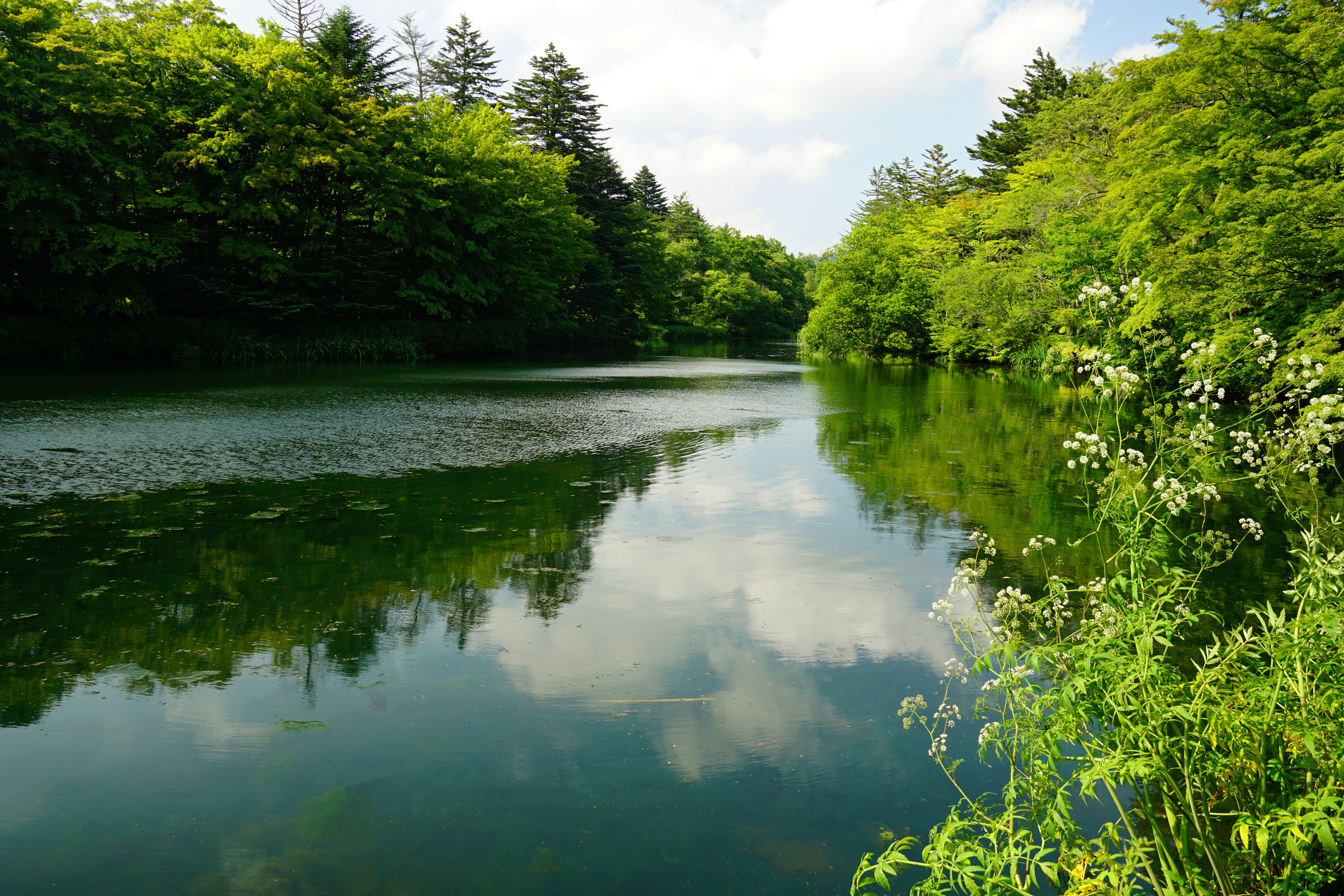
Kumoba Pond

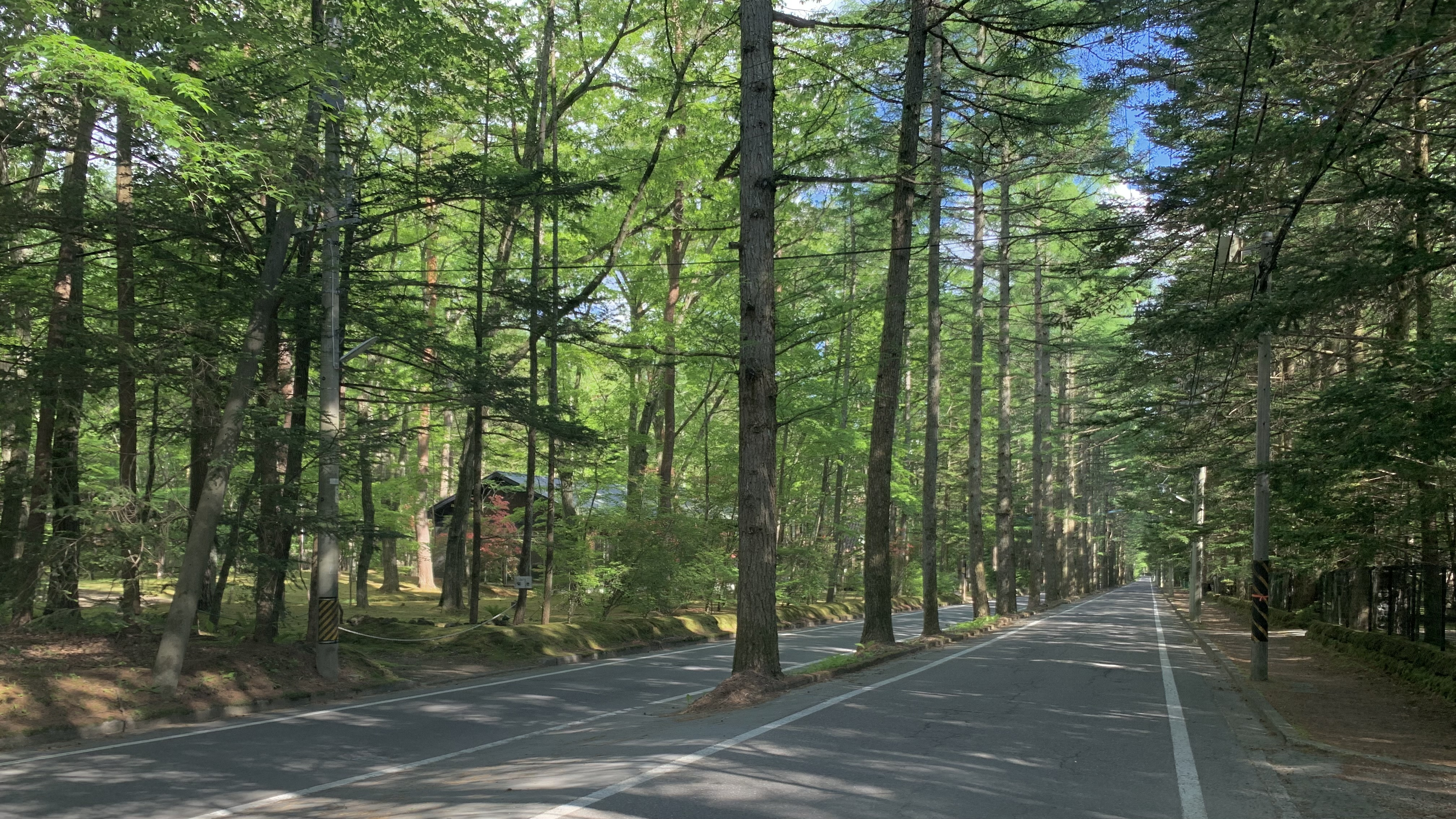
Mikasa Street

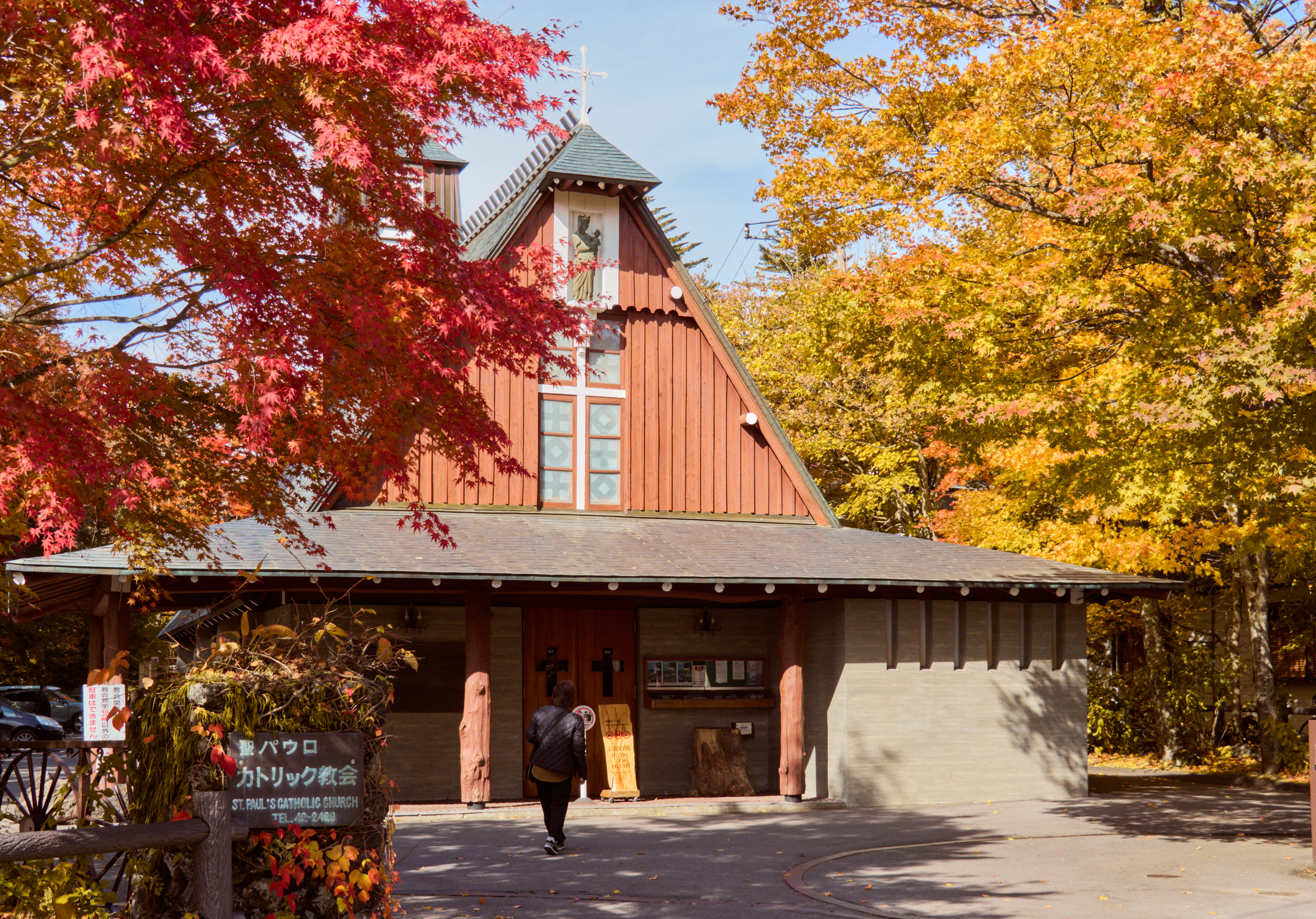
St. Paul's Catholic Church in Karuizawa, surrounded by autumn foliage.

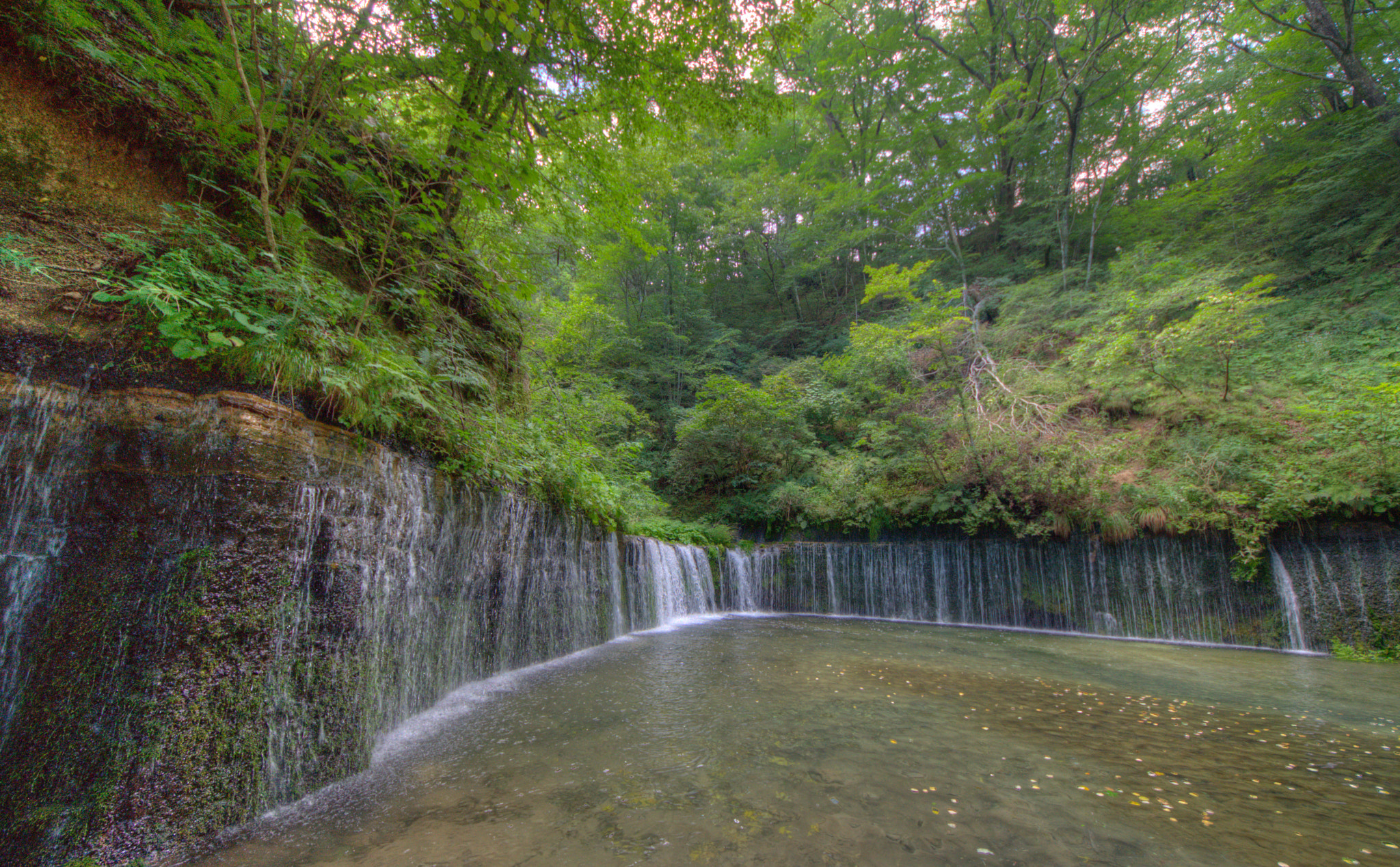
Shiraito Falls

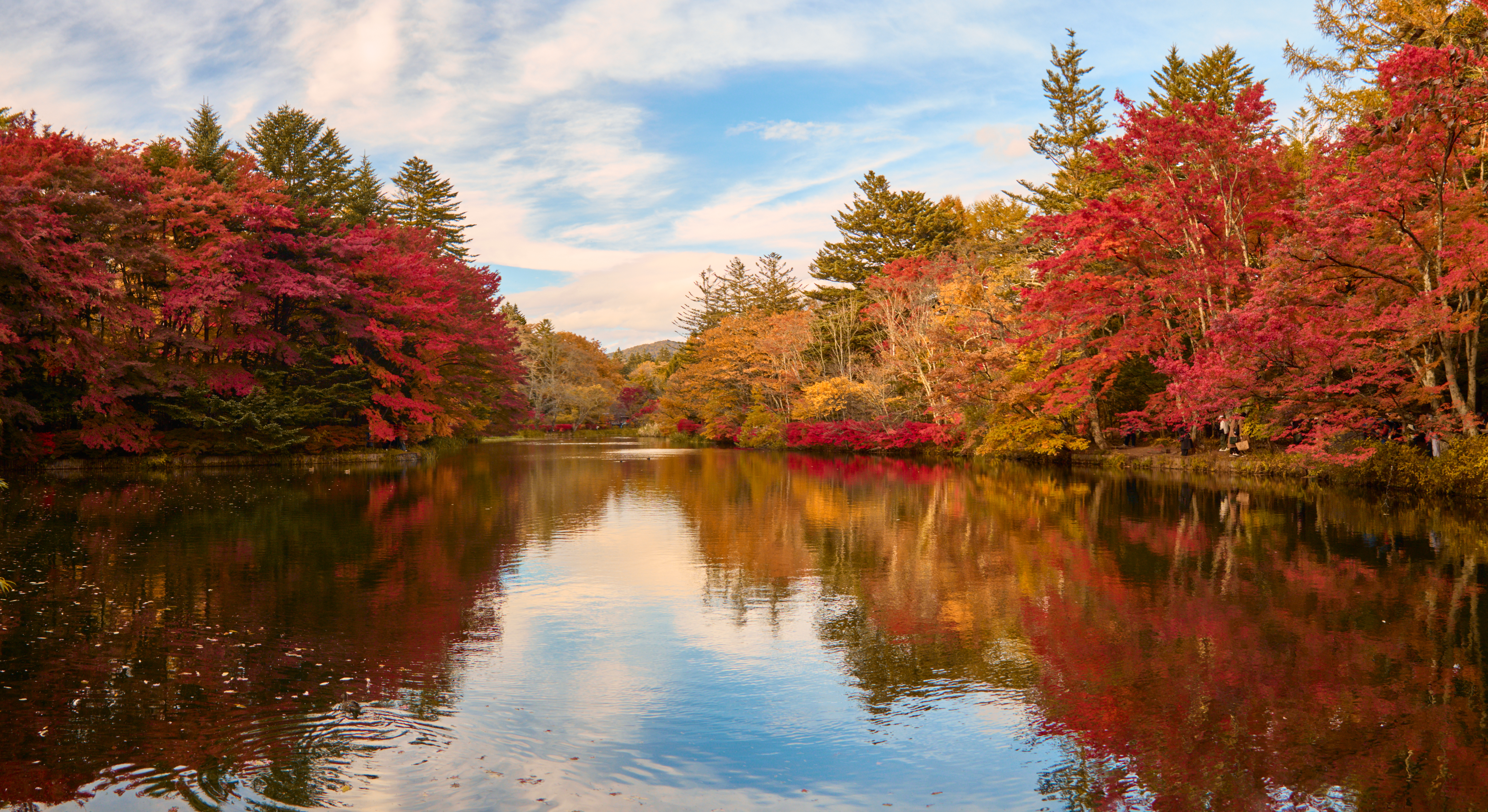
Kumoba Pond in autumn.

With its comparatively cool summer weather, its cold refreshing nights, its heavy air-clearing showers, its southern aspect, and its position close to some of the most picturesque mountain scenery of Japan, Karuizawa leaves little to be desired as a summer retreat.

— Cargill Gilston Knott, "Notes on the Summer Climate of Karuizawa", 1891

... while quite recently even Japanese gentlemen of high degree have begun to build houses and introduce their families. As in so many other cases, the world followed the lead of the missionaries. Foreigners are now the raison d’étre of Karuizawa, and no echo of Feudalism haunts the hills.

— Ernest Foxwell, "A Tale of Karuizawa", 1903

Karuizawa, the most popular summer resort in the whole of the Far East […] .

— Arthur Lloyd, "Every-day Japan", 1909

Karuizawa was developed as a European-style resort town by a Scottish-Canadian missionary in 1888. In the following decades, the town attracted visitors from across the country seeking to escape the heat of summer and enjoy vacations, as well as a significant number of Westerners. Unlike many other hill stations, Karuizawa was actively open to the natives from the beginning, and many Japanese aristocrats (Kazoku), scholars, artists and others had already built "Western-style" villas in the town by the early 20th century. The Japanese and Western communities interacted well with each other through summer recreation activities and the like. In the 21st century the town retains significant Western cultural influence, and its alpine beauty and cool summer climate (similar to parts of Europe) continue to draw visitors.

More recently, Karuizawa has become a popular year-round resort for mainly Japanese, offering many outdoor sports, hot springs and recreational activities. Convenient road and rail access from central Tokyo has ensured Karuizawa's popularity as a location for second homes and resort hotels since the Meiji era.

Karuizawa is known for its historic shopping street known as "Ginza dōri" or "Kyū-dō" (Ginza Street, or the Old Road) and association with both Japanese royalty and visitors such as John Lennon and Yoko Ono. As a side note, The Crown Prince Akihito met Michiko Shoda for the first time on a tennis court in Karuizawa in August 1957, and John Lennon spent several summers in Karuizawa with his family in the late 1970s.

Karuizawa hosted equestrian events in the 1964 Summer Olympics as well as curling in the 1998 Winter Olympics. It is the first city in the world to host both Summer and Winter Olympic events.

Since 1997, Karuizawa has been accessible via the JR East Nagano Shinkansen. New high speed rail links has resulted in modest population growth and the development of large outlet style shopping malls.

== In popular media ==
- The Birds of Karuizawa from Sept haïkaï, Olivier Messiaen's composition
- The Wind Rises, Studio Ghibli film

Karuizawa appeared in a part of the film.

- When Marnie Was There, Studio Ghibli film

The model of the mansion that appeared in the film is the villa in Karuizawa.

- Karuizawa Yūkai Annai, Enix adventure game
- The Curious Adventures of Sherlock Holmes in Japan, Dale Furutani's novel

The story is based on the premise that Sherlock Holmes was in Karuizawa in the "missing years (1891–1894)".

- The anime series Ouran High School Host Club

Episodes 15 and 16 are set in Karuizawa.

== Notable residents ==
And now I am writing in the most lovely study in the world. Over my head the pine branches meet in arches of kindly green; […].

— Mary Crawford Fraser, "A Diplomatist's Wife in Japan: Letters from Home to Home", 1899

There followed a delightful few days in Karuizawa, our last for the summer. Douglas Fairbanks was a most acceptable guest, […].

— Joseph Grew, Private diary, 1932

Summers in Karuizawa were not just a break in the year but seemed a whole lifetime in themselves. I have far more memories of the minutiae of life there than I do of the much longer periods of time spent in Tokyo.

— Edwin O. Reischauer, "My Life Between Japan and America", 1986

Karuizawa is an old summer resort in Japan very much like the Hamptons except it's in the mountains. There is a coffee house in a pine forest near Karuizawa. John & I fell in love with the place, and found ourselves going there almost every day with Sean.

— Yoko Ono, "THE LIGHTER", 2000

They (Olivia's parents) had two properties up in Karuizawa in the mountains for the summer. People fled Tokyo in the summer because the heat is quite extreme.

— Olivia de Havilland, Interview, 2006

- Massimo Baistrocchi, Italian diplomat
- Paul Bryan, British Conservative politician
- Tatsuo Hori, Japanese writer
- Paul Jacoulet, French woodblock print artist
- T. Canby Jones, American professor
- Neil Gordon Munro, Scottish physician and anthropologist
- E. Herbert Norman, Canadian diplomat and historian
- Tabaimo, Japanese artist
- Yukihiro Takahashi, Japanese drummer
- Masayoshi Takanaka, Japanese musician, producer and composer
- Kōji Tamaki, Japanese singer
- Towa Tei, Japanese record producer
- Kazumi Watanabe, Japanese guitarist
- Ken Watanabe, Japanese actor
- Ronald Lampman Watts, Canadian professor
- Willie Weeks, American bass guitarist
- Baron and admiral, the Uriu branch of the family, the domain of the Japanese admiral Uryū

=== Summer residents ===
- Akihito, Japanese emperor
- Ryūnosuke Akutagawa, Japanese writer
- Topazia Alliata, Italian noblewoman and painter
- Takeo Arishima, Japanese writer
- Prince Yasuhiko Asaka, member of the Japanese imperial family
- Tarō Asō, Japanese prime minister
- Edgar Bancroft, American diplomat
- Edward Bickersteth, Anglican missionary
- Francis Brinkley, Anglo-Irish editor
- Robert L. Eichelberger, American general officer
- Ichikawa Ennosuke III, Japanese kabuki actor
- Joseph Grew, American diplomat
- Walter de Havilland, English patent attorney
- James Main Dixon, Scottish professor
- Hugh Fraser, English diplomat
- Beate Sirota Gordon, Austrian-born American performing arts presenter
- Matsumoto Hakuō II, Japanese kabuki actor
- Ichirō Hatoyama, Japanese prime minister
- Shigeaki Hinohara, Japanese physician
- Hirohito, Japanese emperor
- Morihiro Hosokawa, Japanese prime minister
- Nitobe Inazō, Japanese author
- Shōjirō Ishibashi, Japanese businessman
- Arata Isozaki, Japanese architect
- Yasunari Kawabata, Japanese writer
- Donald Keene, American writer and professor
- Mary Eddy Kidder, American missionary
- Kunihiko Kodaira, Japanese mathematician
- Fumimaro Konoe, Japanese prime minister
- Bernard Leach, British studio potter
- John Lennon, English musician
- Dacia Maraini, Italian writer
- Fosco Maraini, Italian photographer
- Empress Masako, Japanese empress
- Empress Michiko, Japanese empress
- Akio Morita, Japanese businessman
- Naruhito, Japanese emperor
- Sadako Ogata, Japanese professor
- Yoko Ono, Japanese artist
- Antonin Raymond, Czech-American architect
- August Karl Reischauer, American missionary
- Edwin O. Reischauer, American diplomat
- Hannah Riddell, English missionary
- Roman Rosen, Russian baron and diplomat
- Junzo Sakakura, Japanese architect
- Eisaku Satō, Japanese prime minister
- William J. Sebald, American diplomat
- Alexander Croft Shaw, Canadian missionary
- Ōkuma Shigenobu, Japanese prime minister
- Leo Sirota, Ukrainian-born Jewish pianist
- Masayoshi Son, Korean-Japanese businessman
- D. T. Suzuki, Japanese Buddhist monk
- Yoshiaki Tsutsumi, Japanese businessman
- Merrell Vories Hitotsuyanagi, American architect
- J. G. Waller, Canadian missionary
- Walter Weston, English missionary
- Sayuri Yoshinaga, Japanese actress

=== Evacuees of World War II ===
- Widar Bagge, Swedish diplomat
- Varvara Bubnova, Russian painter
- Karlfried Graf Dürckheim, German diplomat and Zen master
- Robert Guillain, French journalist
- Francis Haar, Hungarian socio-photographer
- Eta Harich-Schneider, German harpsichordist
- Manfred Gurlitt, German conductor
- Leonid Kreutzer, Russian-born Jewish pianist
- Alexander Mogilevsky, Ukrainian violinist
- Victor Pokrovsky, Russian choral director
- Joseph Rosenstock, Polish-born American conductor
- Victor Starffin, Russian baseball player
