= Hime kaidō =

Minor routes in the Edo period of Japan

Hime kaidō (姫街道, princess route) was the name given to minor routes that created detours around the difficult crossings (or river crossings) of main routes during the Edo period in Japan. These routes could be found on many of the Edo Five Routes, as well as on other sub-routes that crossed the country.

== Naming ==
When there were difficult passes or river crossings on the main routes, hime kaidō were established to avoid them. Because there were fewer travellers, less danger, a lower chance of an attack by bandits (compared with the main route they were avoiding), it was said that people could relax while traveling the route. It was for these reasons that women often chose to travel these routes, giving rise to the routes being called hime kaidō or onna kaidō ("women's route").

There were different definitions of what made a hime kaidō, as some detours just went around one difficult area, while others were much longer and avoided most of the dangerous routes. Because of the various definitions, the Nakasendō was sometimes referred to as a hime kaidō, because the distance was much greater and the danger was much less than that of the Tōkaidō, which started and ended at the same location.

Other features employed the same naming conventions, including hills. Some hills in front of temples and shrines that had steep gradients were called "men's hills" (男坂 otoko no saka), while hills that were easier to climb were called "women's hills" (女坂 onna no saka)

== Notable hime kaidō ==
Tōkaidō
Between Mitsuke-juku and Goyu-shuku, which bypassed six other post stations on the Tōkaidō.

== See also ==
- Kaidō
