= Chikuni Station =

Railway station in Otari, Nagano Prefecture, Japan

Ōito Line10 Chikuni Station 千国駅
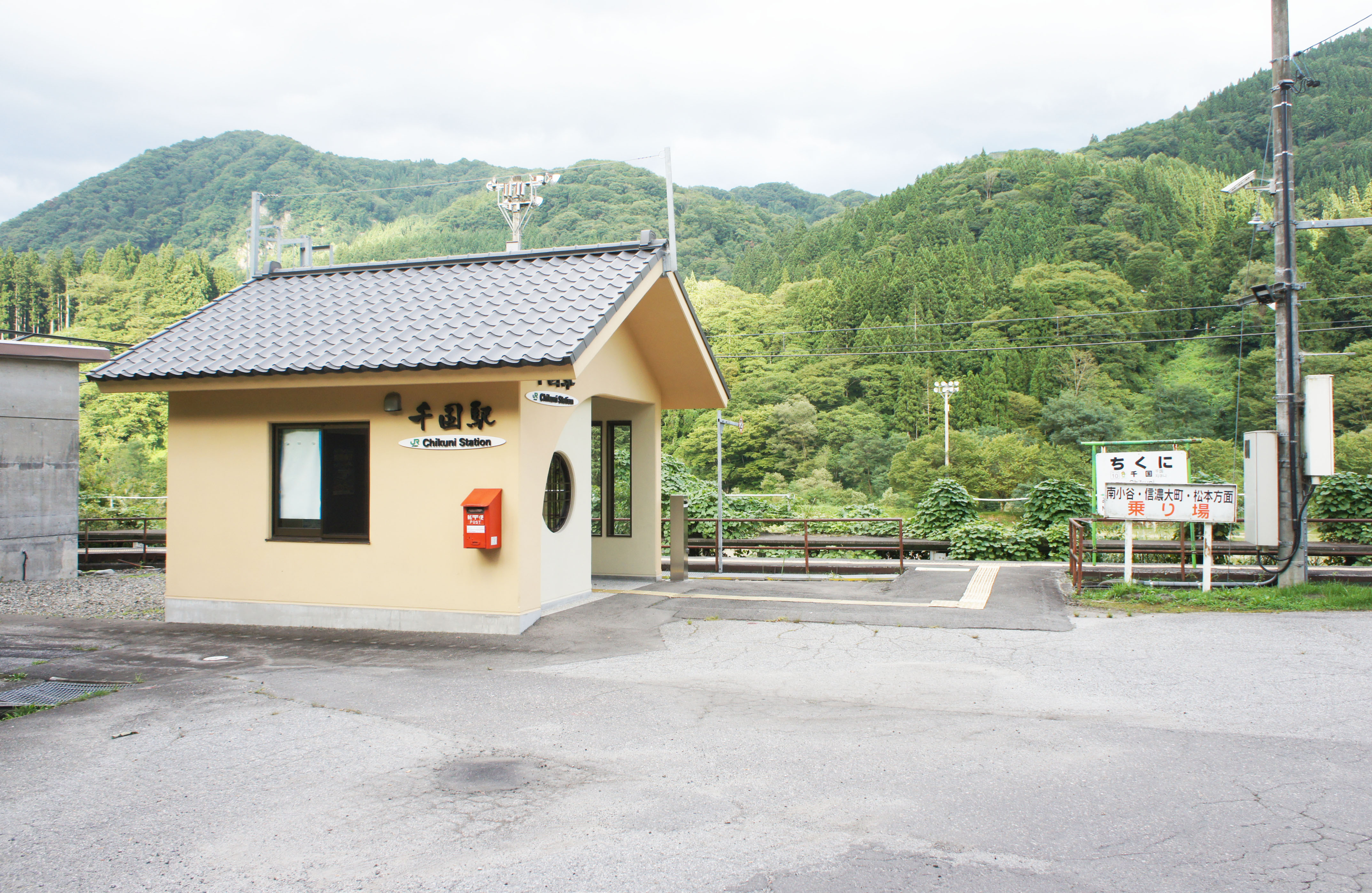
- Chikuni Station in August 2021

General information
- Location: 7730 Chikuni-Otsu, Otari-mura, Kitaazumi-gun, Nagano-ken 399-9422; Japan
- Coordinates: 36.7634°N 137.9011°E
- Elevation: 539.6 meters
- Operator: JR East
- Line: ■ Ōito Line
- Distance: 68.7 km from Matsumoto
- Platforms: 1 side platform
- Tracks: 1

Other information
- Status: Unstaffed
- Station code: 10
- Website: Official website

History
- Opened: 25 December 1962; 63 years ago

Passengers
- FY2011: 2

Services
Preceding station	JR East	Following station
Minami-Otari 9 Terminus	Ōito Line Local	Hakuba-Ōike 11 towards Matsumoto
Location
- Location within Nagano Prefecture Location within Japan

Chikuni Station (千国駅, Chikuni-eki) is a railway station on the Ōito Line in the village of Otari, Kitaazumi District, Nagano Prefecture, Japan, operated by East Japan Railway Company (JR East).

== Lines ==
Chikuni Station is served by the Ōito Line and is 68.7 kilometers from the starting point of the line at Matsumoto Station.

== Station layout ==
The station consists of one ground-level side platform serving a single bi-directional track. The station is unattended.

== History ==
The station opened on 25 December 1962. With the privatization of Japanese National Railways (JNR) on 1 April 1987 the station came under the control of JR East.

== Surrounding area ==
- Otari Elementary School
- National Route 148

== See also ==
- List of railway stations in Japan
