= Shinano-Moriue Station =

Railway station in Hakuba, Nagano Prefecture, Japan

Ōito Line12 Shinano-Moriue Station 信濃森上駅
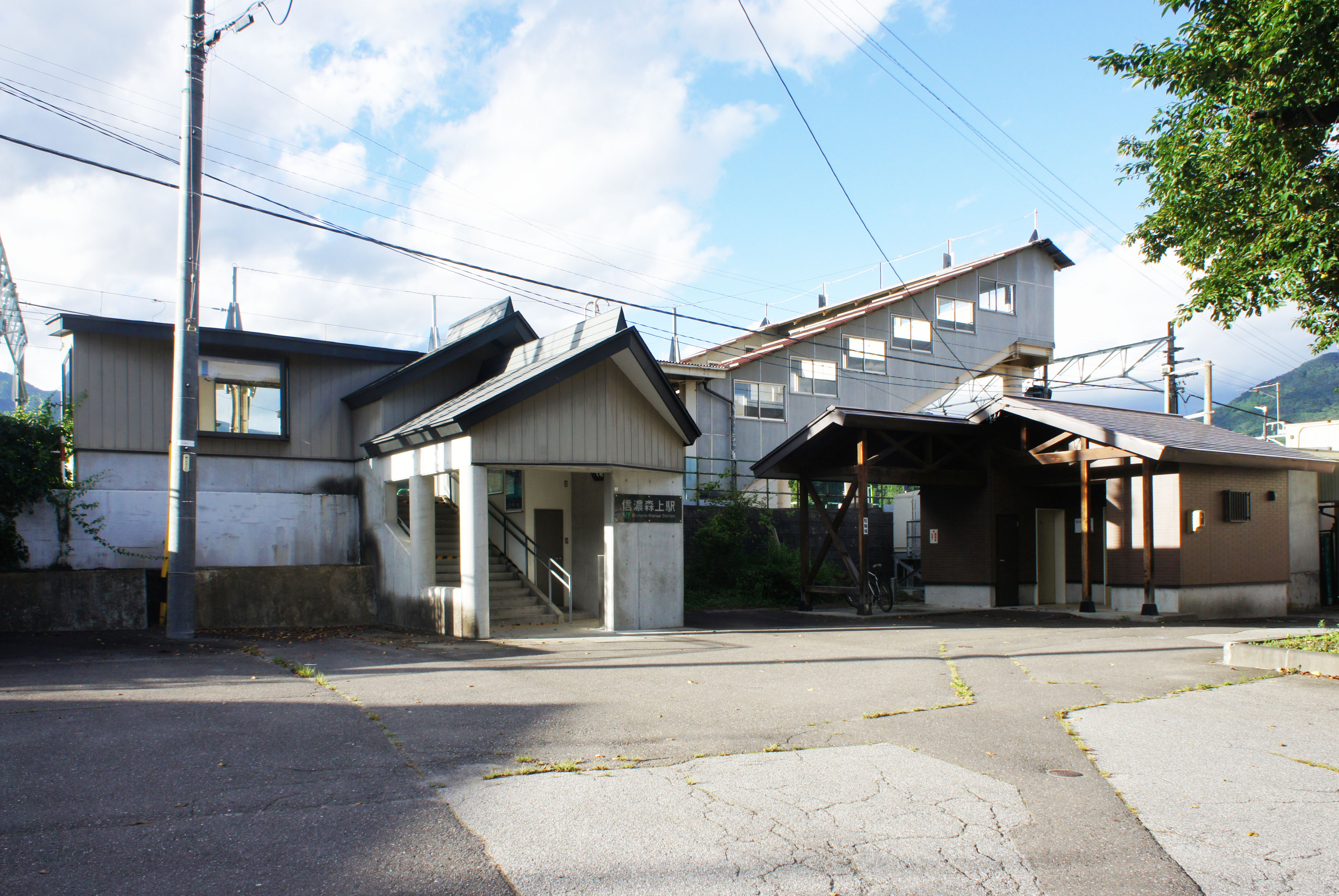
- Shinano-Moriue Station in August 2021

General information
- Location: 10667 Hokujō-Moriue, Hakuba-mura, Kitaazumi-gun, Nagano-ken 399-9301; Japan
- Coordinates: 36.7112°N 137.8720°E
- Elevation: 687.2 meters
- Operator: JR East
- Line: ■ Ōito Line
- Distance: 61.6 km from Matsumoto
- Platforms: 2 side platforms
- Tracks: 2

Other information
- Status: Unstaffed
- Station code: 12
- Website: Official website

History
- Opened: 20 November 1932; 93 years ago

Passengers
- FY2011: 25

Services
Preceding station	JR East	Following station
Minami-Otari One-way operation	Ōito Line Rapid	Hakuba 13 towards Shinano-Ōmachi
Hakuba-Ōike 11 towards Minami-Otari	Ōito Line Local	Hakuba 13 towards Matsumoto
Location
- Location within Nagano Prefecture Location within Japan

Shinano-Moriue Station (信濃森上駅, Shinano-Moriue-eki) is a railway station on the Ōito Line in Hokujō, in the village of Hakuba, Kitaazumi District, Nagano Prefecture, Japan, operated by East Japan Railway Company (JR East). Also known as Shinano-Morioka & Ueno.

== Lines ==
Shinano-Moriue Station is served by the Ōito Line and is 61.6 kilometers from the starting point of the line at Matsumoto Station.

== Station layout ==
The station consists of two ground-level opposed side platforms connected by a footbridge. The station is unattended.

=== Platforms ===
Up	■ Ōito Line	for Hakuba, Shinano-Ōmachi, Hotaka, Toyoshina and Matsumoto
Down	■ Ōito Line	for Minami-Otari

== History ==
The station opened on 20 November 1932. With the privatization of Japanese National Railways (JNR) on 1 April 1987 the station came under the control of JR East.

== Surrounding area ==
- National Route 148

== See also ==
- List of railway stations in Japan
