= Minami-Kamishiro Station =

Railway station in Hakuba, Nagano Prefecture, Japan

Ōito Line16 Minami-Kamishiro Station 南神城駅
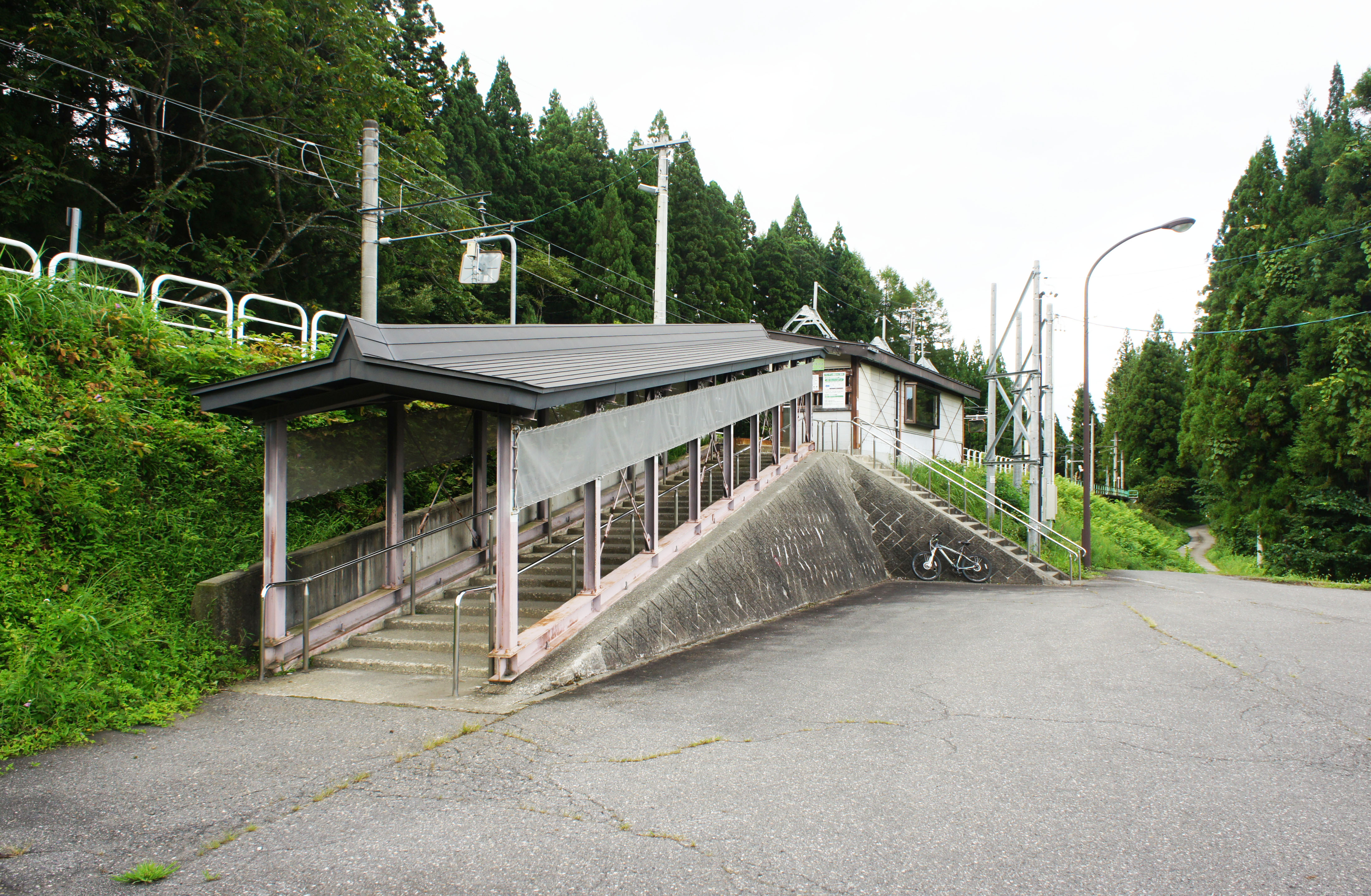
- Minami-Kamishiro Station, August 2021

General information
- Location: Kamishiro-Sano, Hakuba-mura, Kitaazumi-gun, Nagano-ken 399-9211; Japan
- Coordinates: 36°38′13.46″N 137°50′29.65″E
- Elevation: 769.2 meters
- Operator: JR East
- Line: ■ Ōito Line
- Distance: 52.8 km from Matsumoto
- Platforms: 1 side platform

Other information
- Status: Unstaffed
- Station code: 16
- Website: Official website

History
- Opened: 15 December 1942; 83 years ago

Passengers
- FY2011: 21

Services
| Preceding station | JR East | Following station |
|---|---|---|
| Kamishiro 15 towards Minami-Otari | Ōito Line Local | Yanaba 18 towards Matsumoto |
Former services
| Preceding station | JR East | Following station |
|---|---|---|
| Kamishiro 15 towards Minami-Otari | Ōito Line Local | Yanaba-Ski-jō-mae 17 towards Matsumoto |
Location
- Location within Nagano Prefecture Location within Japan

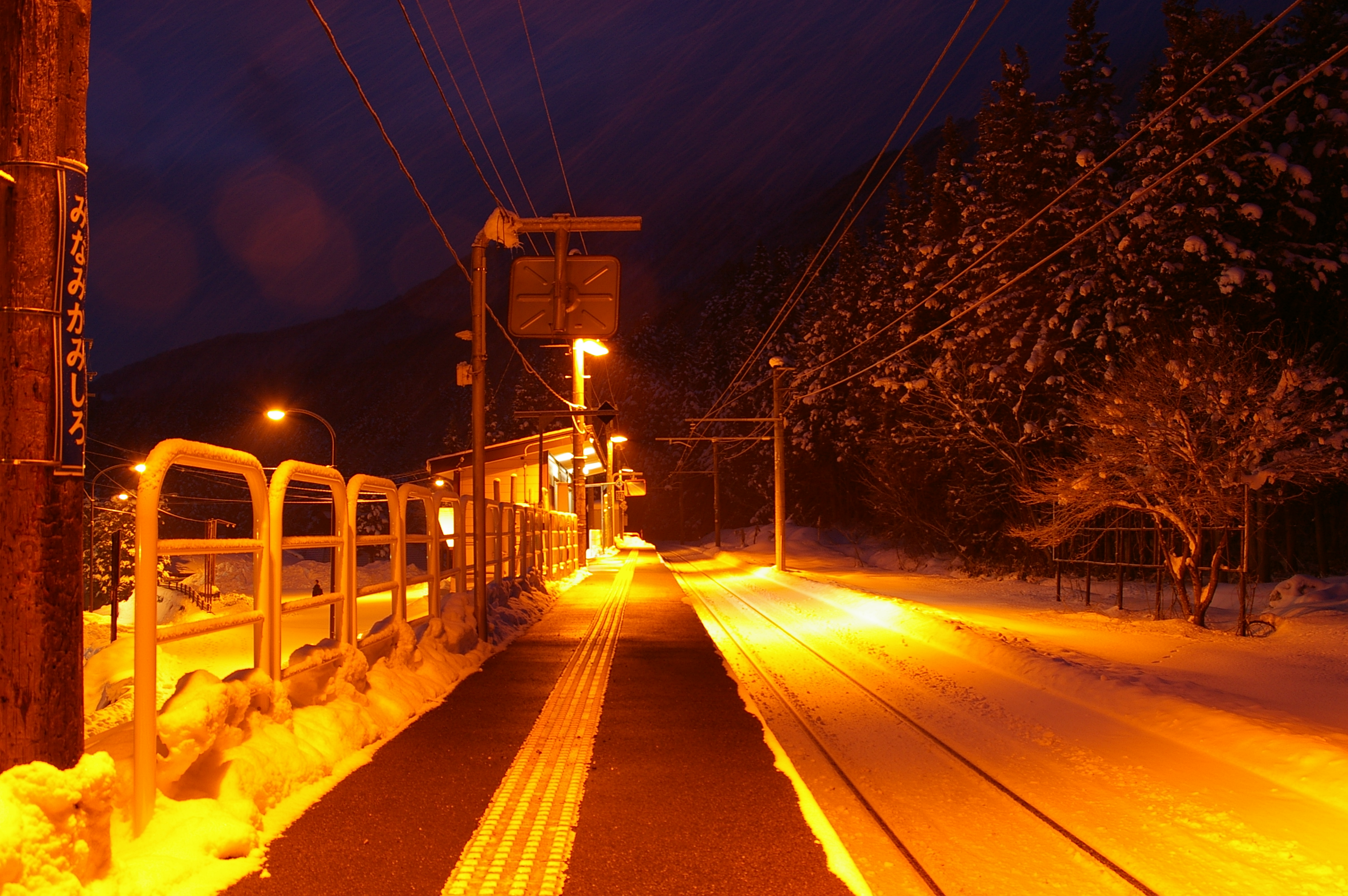
Minami-Kamishiro platform, January 2007

Minami-Kamishiro Station (南神城駅, Minami-Kamishiro-eki) is a railway station in Kamishiro, the village of Hakuba, Kitaazumi District, Nagano Prefecture, Japan, operated by East Japan Railway Company (JR East).

== Lines ==
Minami-Kamishiro Station is served by the Ōito Line and is 52.8 kilometers from the terminus of the line at Matsumoto Station.

== Station layout ==
The station consists of one ground-level side platform serving a single bi-directional track. The station is unattended.

== History ==
The station opened on 5 December 1942. With the privatization of Japanese National Railways (JNR) on 1 April 1987 the station came under the control of JR East.

== Surrounding area ==
- National Route 148

== See also ==
- List of railway stations in Japan
