= Kamishiro Station =

Railway station in Hakuba, Nagano Prefecture, Japan

Ōito Line15 Kamishiro Station 神城駅
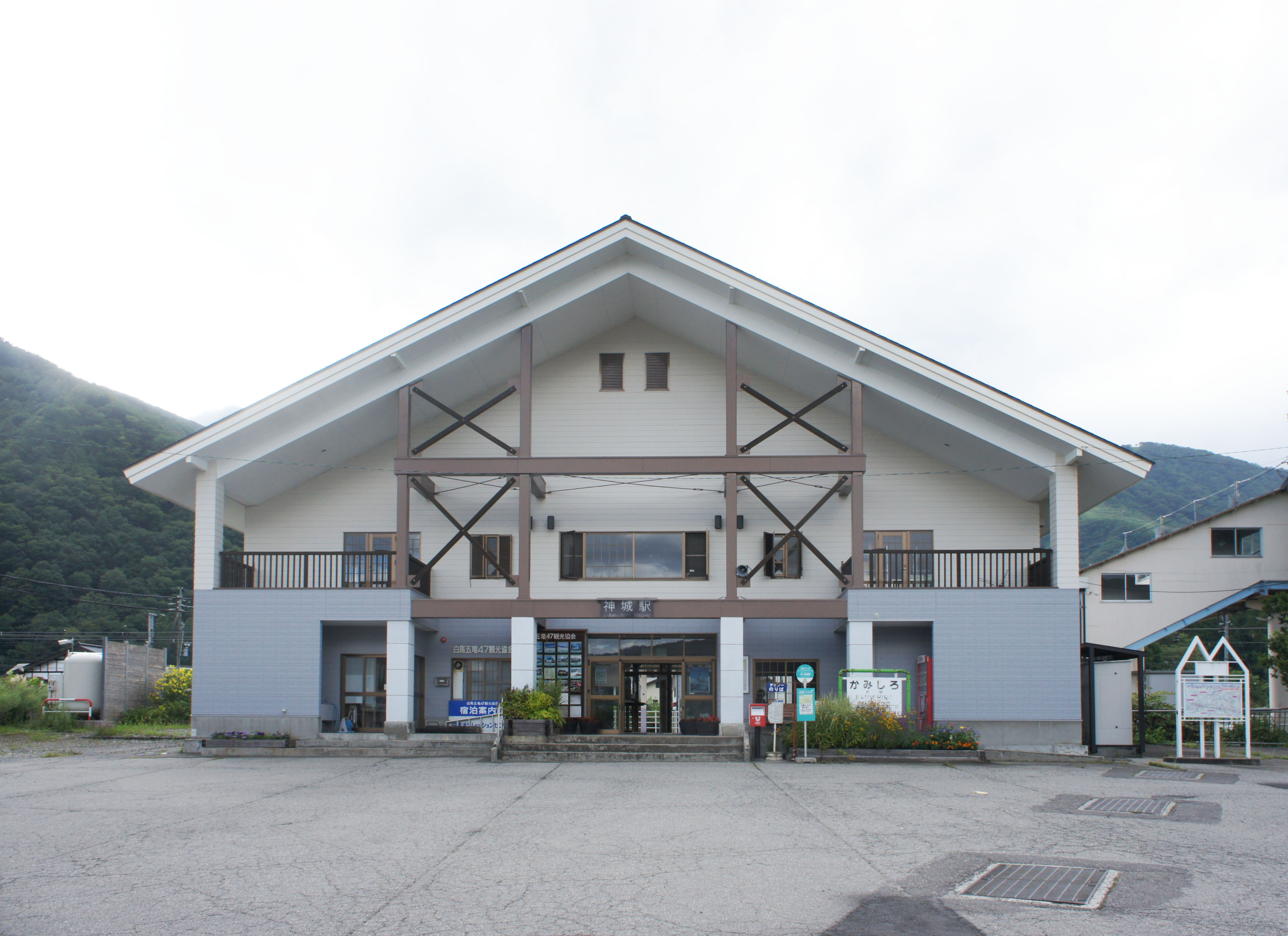
- Kamishiro Station, August 2021

General information
- Location: Kamishiro, Hakuba-mura, Kitaazumi-gun, Nagano-ken 399-9211; Japan
- Coordinates: 36.6584°N 137.8468°E
- Elevation: 746.2 meters
- Operator: JR East
- Line: ■ Ōito Line
- Distance: 55.2 km from Matsumoto
- Platforms: 1 side + 1 island platform
- Tracks: 3

Other information
- Status: Staffed
- Station code: 15
- Website: Official website

History
- Opened: 25 October 1930; 95 years ago

Passengers
- FY2015: 48 daily

Services
Preceding station	JR East	Following station
Hakuba One-way operation	Ōito Line Rapid	Yanaba 18 towards Shinano-Ōmachi
Iimori 14 towards Minami-Otari	Ōito Line Local	Minami-Kamishiro 16 towards Matsumoto
Location
- Location within Nagano Prefecture Location within Japan

Kamishiro Station (神城駅, Kamishiro-eki) is a railway station on the Ōito Line in the village of Hakuba, Kitaazumi District, Nagano Prefecture, Japan, operated by East Japan Railway Company (JR East).

== Lines ==
Kamishiro Station is served by the Ōito Line and is 55.2 kilometers from the starting point of the line at Matsumoto Station.

== Station layout ==
Kamishiro Station consists of a one ground-level side platform and one island platform serving three tracks, connected by a footbridge. The station is a Kan'i itaku station.

=== Platforms ===
1	■ Ōito Line	for Shinano-Ōmachi, Toyoshina and Matsumoto
2	■ Ōito Line	for Hakuba and Minami-Otari
3	■ Ōito Line	(siding)

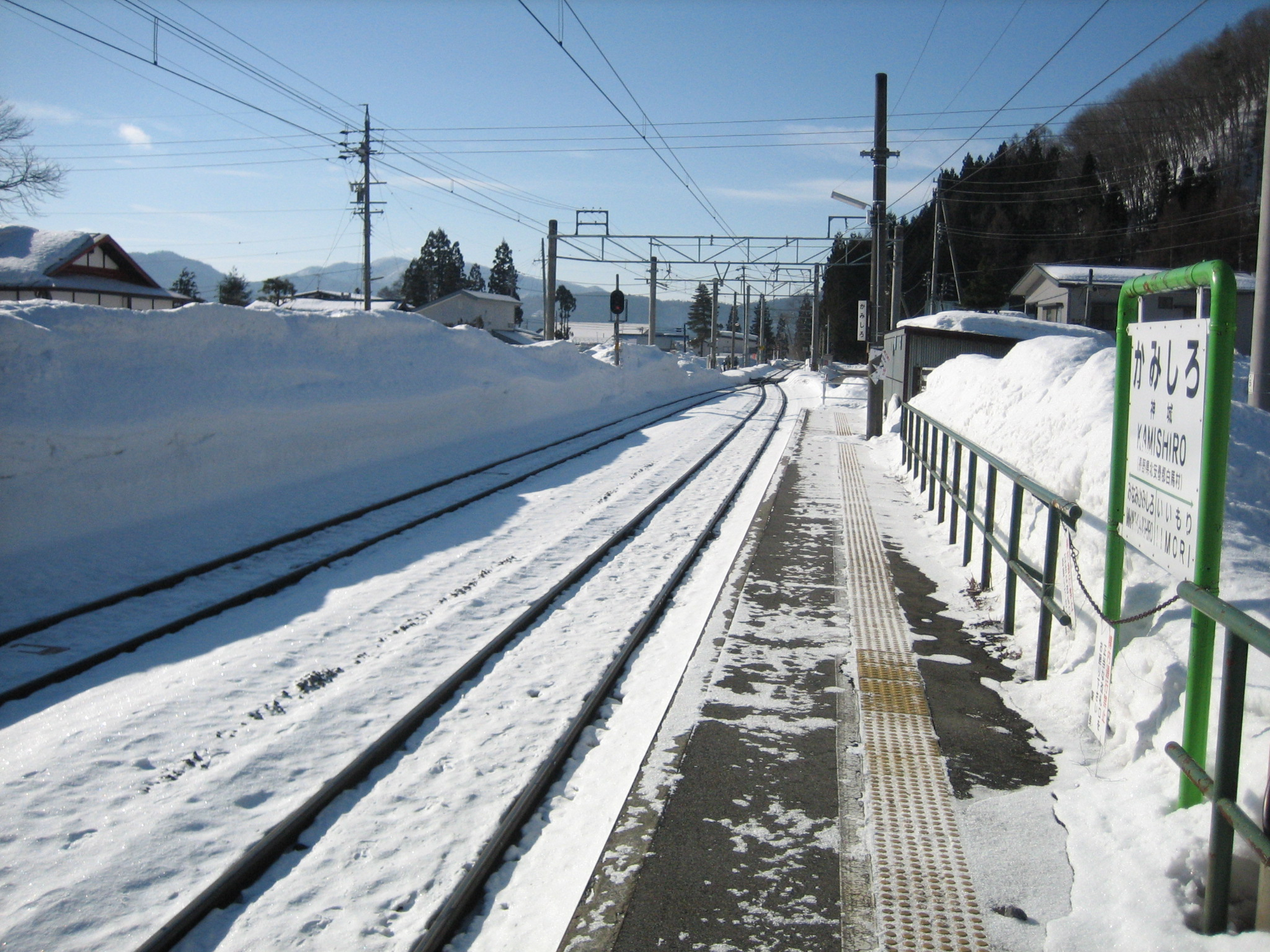
Kamishiro Station platform in March 2006

== History ==
The station opened on 25 October 1930. With the privatization of Japanese National Railways (JNR) on 1 April 1987, the station came under the control of JR East.

== Passenger statistics ==
In fiscal 2015, the station was used by an average of 48 passengers daily (boarding passengers only).

== Surrounding area ==
- National Route 148

== See also ==
- List of railway stations in Japan
