= Hakuba-Ōike Station =

Railway station in Otari, Nagano Prefecture, Japan

Ōito Line11 Hakuba-Ōike Station 白馬大池駅
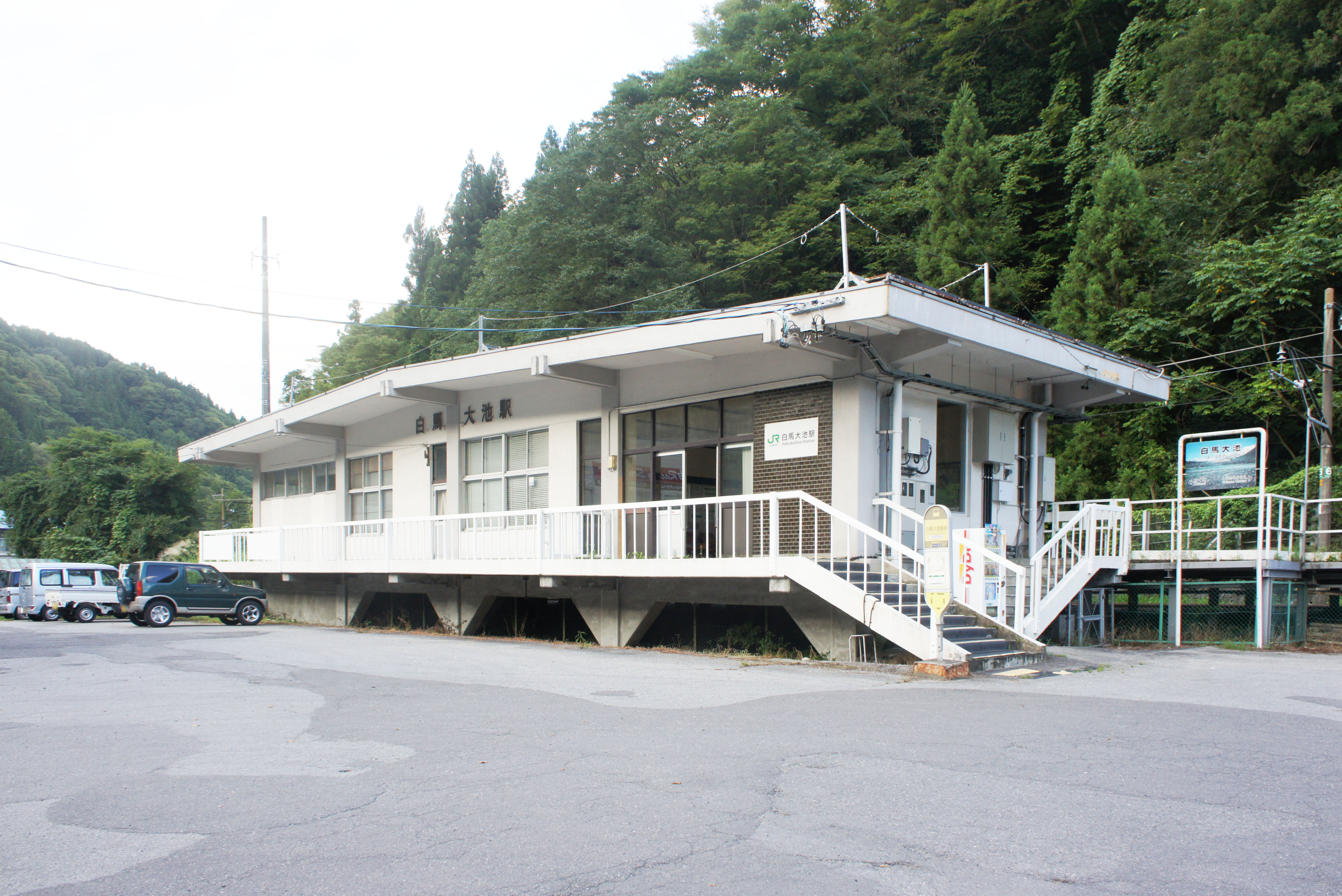
- Hakuba-Ōike station, August 2021

General information
- Location: 7730 Chikuni-Otsu, Otari-mura, Kitaazumi-gun, Nagano-ken 399-9422; Japan
- Coordinates: 36°44′23.23″N 137°53′8.05″E
- Elevation: 593.9 meters
- Operator: JR East
- Line: ■ Ōito Line
- Distance: 65.4 km from Matsumoto
- Platforms: 1 side platforms

Other information
- Status: Unstaffed
- Station code: 11
- Website: Official website

History
- Opened: 25 September 1948; 77 years ago

Passengers
- FY2011: 9

Services
Preceding station	JR East	Following station
Chikuni 10 towards Minami-Otari	Ōito Line Local	Shinano-Moriue 12 towards Matsumoto
Location
- Location within Nagano Prefecture Location within Japan

Hakuba-Ōike Station (白馬大池駅, Hakuba-Ōike-eki) is a railway station in Chikuni, the village of Otari, Kitaazumi District, Nagano Prefecture, Japan, operated by East Japan Railway Company (JR East).

== Lines ==
Hakuba-Ōike Station is served by the Ōito Line and is 65.4 kilometers from the terminus of the line at Matsumoto Station.

== Station layout ==
The station consists of one ground-level side platform serving a single bi-directional track. The station is unattended.

== History ==
The station opened on 25 September 1948. With the privatization of Japanese National Railways (JNR) on 1 April 1987 the station came under the control of JR East.

== Surrounding area ==
- National Route 148

== See also ==
- List of railway stations in Japan
