= Yasaka, Nagano =

Dissolved municipality in Nagano prefecture, Japan

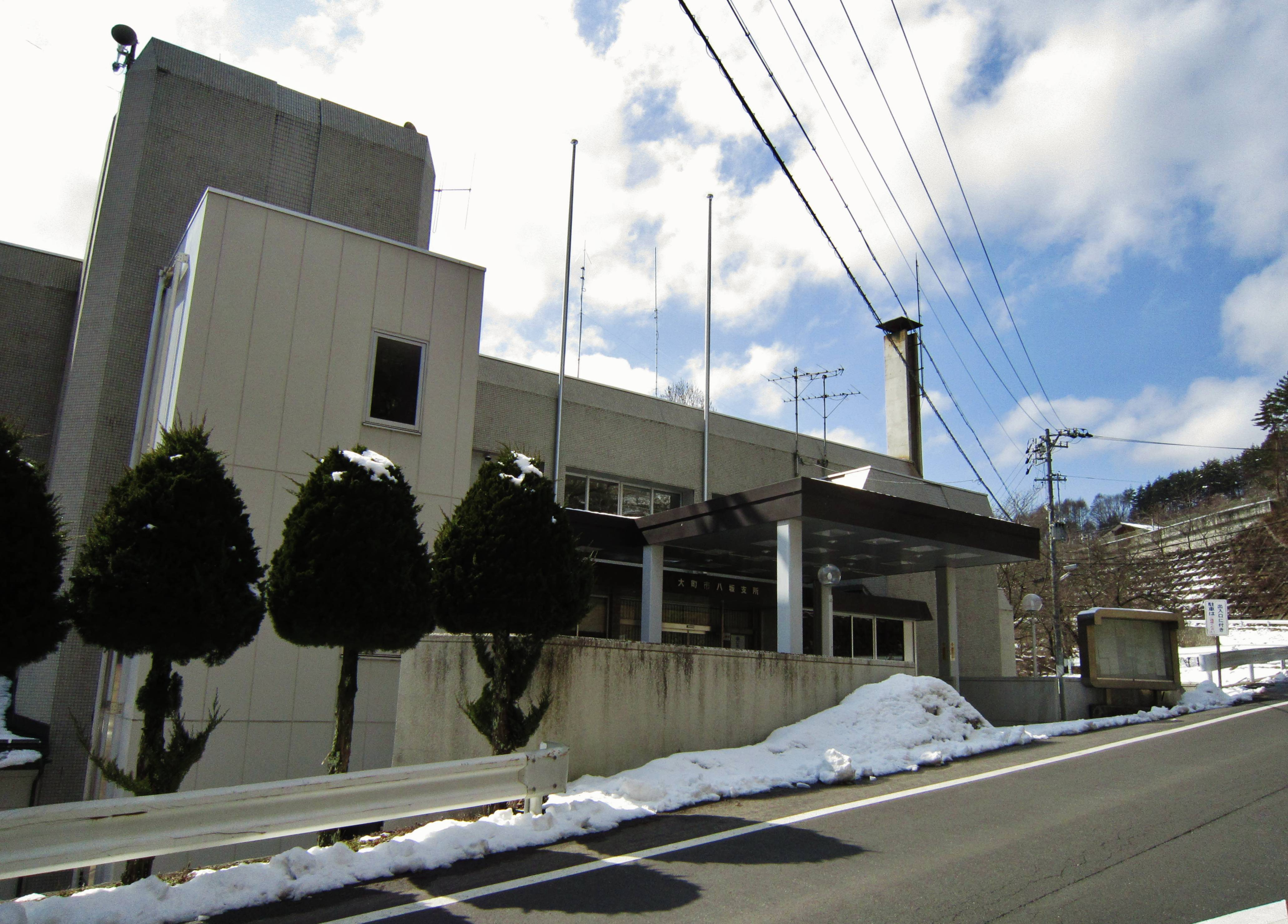
former Yasaka village hall

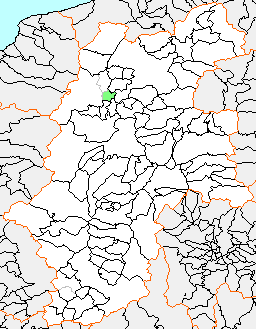
Map of Yasaka, Nagano

Yasaka (八坂村, Yasaka-mura) was a village located in Kitaazumi District, Nagano Prefecture, Japan.

As of 2003, the village had an estimated population of 1,199 and a density of 35.33 persons per km^{2}. The total area was 33.94 km^{2}.

On January 1, 2006, Yasaka, along with the village of Miasa (also from Kitaazumi District), was merged into the expanded city of Ōmachi.
