= Ōmachi, Nagano =

Ōmachi 大町市
- City
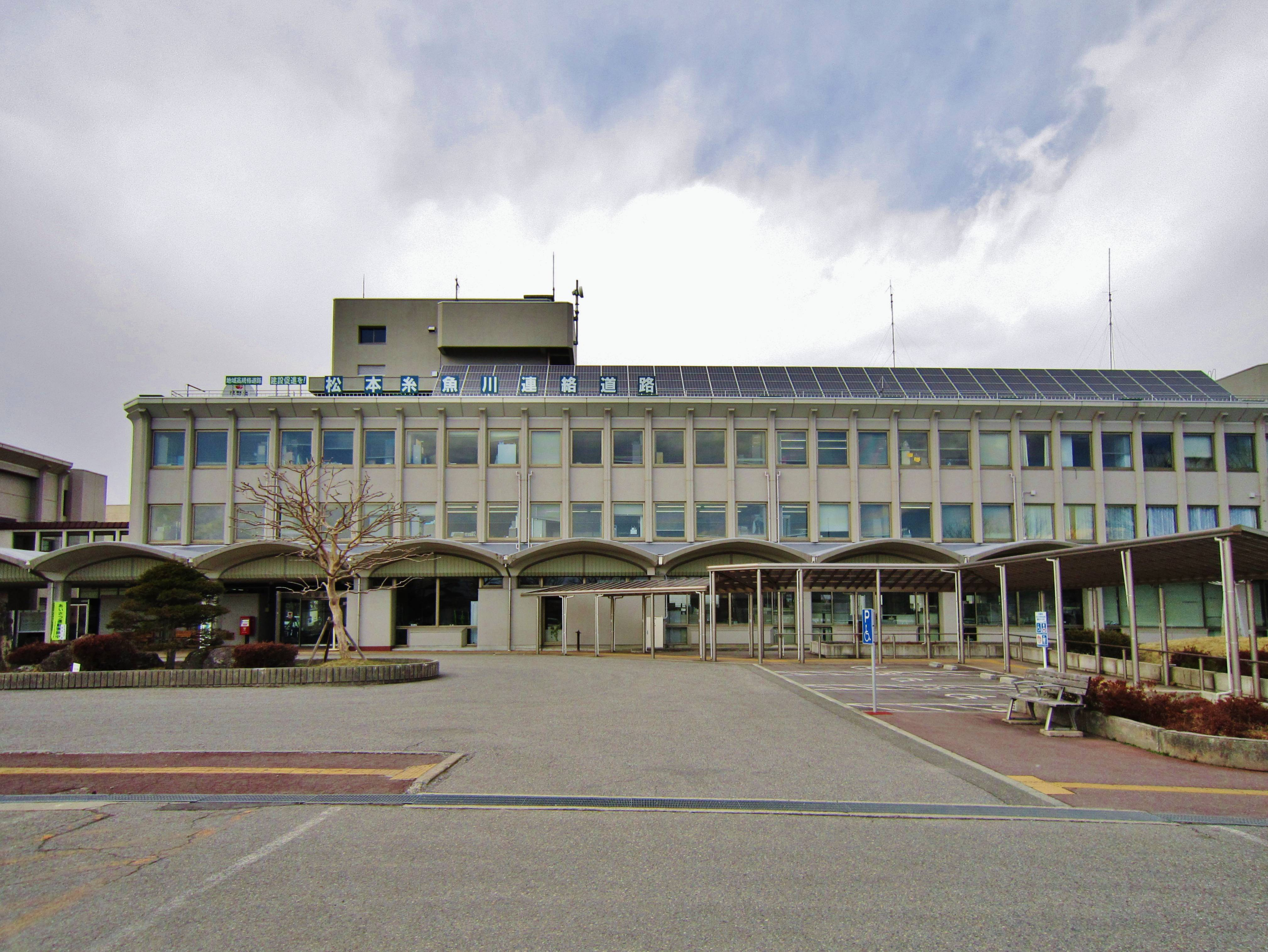
- Ōmachi City Hall

- Flag Seal

- Location of Ōmachi in Nagano Prefecture

- Coordinates: 36°30′10.8″N 137°51′4″E
- Country: Japan
- Region: Chūbu (Kōshin'etsu)
- Prefecture: Nagano
- Village settled: February 18, 1875
- City settled: July 1, 1954

Government
  - Mayor: Ken Yanagihara (柳原健) - from July 2026

Area
  - Total: 565.15 km^{2} (218.21 sq mi)

Population (March 2019)
  - Total: 27,559
  - Density: 48.764/km^{2} (126.30/sq mi)
- Time zone: UTC+9 (Japan Standard Time)
- Symbols
  - Tree: Prunus sargentii
  - Flower: Erythronium japonicum
  - Bird: Rock ptarmigan
  - Animal: Japanese Serow
- Phone number: 0261-22-0420
- Address: 3887, Ōmachi, Ōmachi-shi, Nagano-ken 398-0002
- Website: Official website

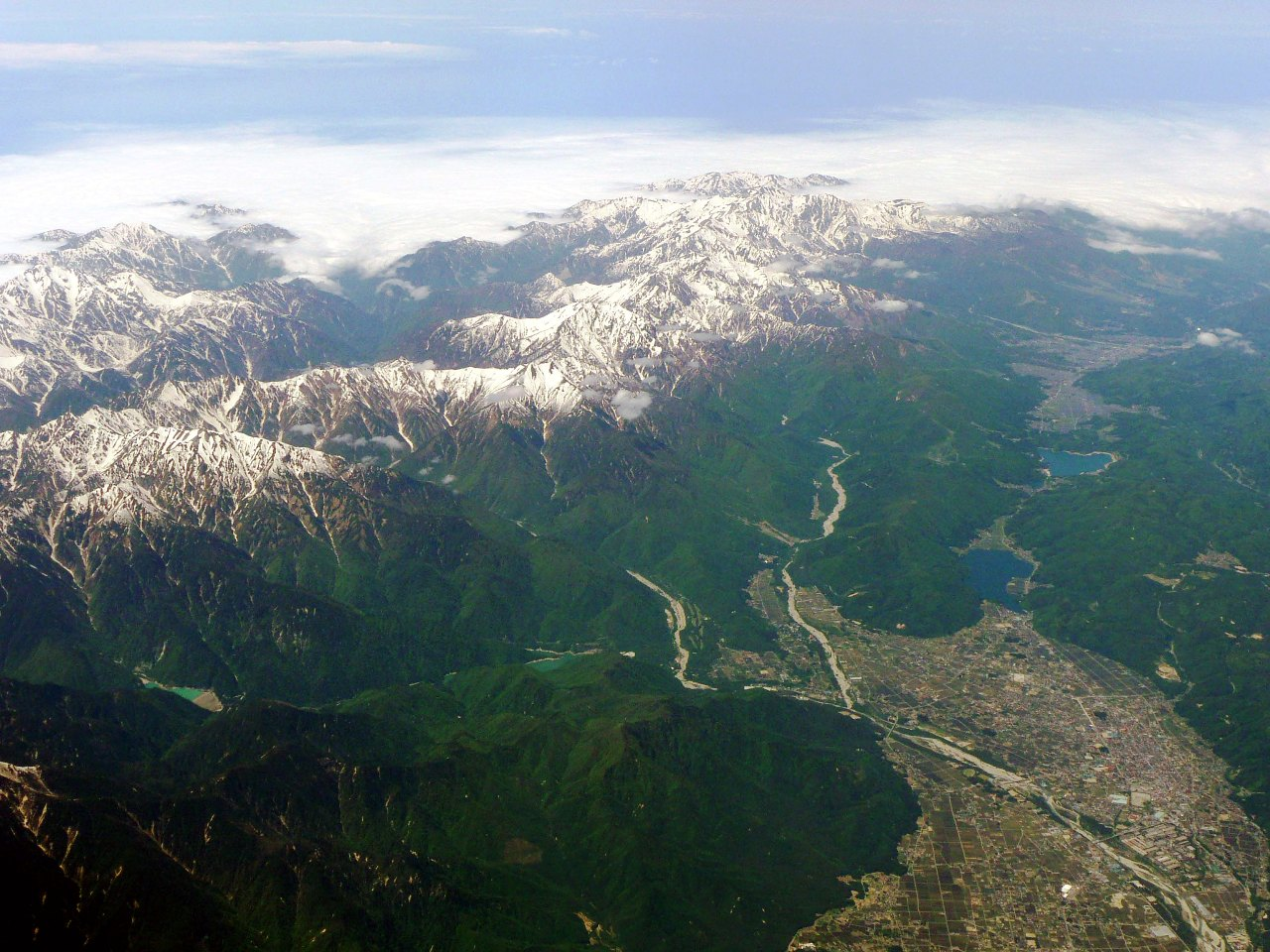
Ōmachi and Takase River

Ōmachi (大町市, Ōmachi-shi; Japanese pronunciation: [ó̞ò̞.mä̀.c̟͡ɕì, ò̞ó̞.mä́.c̟͡ɕi̥.ɕì, ó̞ó̞.mä́.c̟͡ɕi̥-]) is a city located in Nagano Prefecture, Japan. As of 1 March 2019, the city had an estimated population of 27,559 in 11861 households, and a population density of 49 persons per km^{2}. The total area of the city is 565.15 square kilometres (218.21 sq mi).

== Geography ==
Ōmachi is located west of Nagano, the capital of Nagano Prefecture, in the Daihoku District (大北地域, Daihoku-chiiki) of the prefecture. The 3000 meter Northern Japanese Alps (or Hida Mountains) are to the west ranges to the west of the city and mountains of around 1000 meters form the eastern border. The Takase River runs through the city, which is located in the northern Matsumoto basin.

The Itoigawa-Shizuoka Tectonic Line active fault system is also running through the city.

- Mountains: Mount Yarigatake, Mount Noguchigorō (野口五郎岳, Noguchigorō-dake), Mount Eboshi (烏帽子岳, Eboshi-dake), Mount Sugoroku (双六岳, Sugoroku-dake), Mount Otenshō (大天井岳, Otenshō-dake), Mount Tsubakuro (燕岳, Tsubakuro-dake), Mount Gaki (餓鬼岳, Gaki-dake), Mount Harinoki (針ノ木岳, Harinoki-dake), Mount Renge (蓮華岳, Renge-dake), Mount Jii (爺ヶ岳, Jii-ga-take), Mount Kashimayari (鹿島槍ヶ岳, Kashimayari-ga-take), Mount Goryū (五竜岳, Goryū-dake)
- Rivers: Takase River
- Lakes and marshes: Nishina three lakes (仁科三湖, Nishina-san-ko) (Lake Kizaki (木崎湖, Kizaki-ko), Lake Nakatsuna (中綱湖, Nakatsuna-ko), Lake Aoki (青木湖, Aoki-ko))

=== Surrounding municipalities ===
- Gifu Prefecture
  - Takayama
- Nagano Prefecture
  - Azumino
  - Hakuba
  - Ikeda
  - Ikusaka
  - Matsukawa
  - Matsumoto
  - Nagano
  - Ogawa
- Toyama Prefecture
  - Kurobe
  - Tateyama
  - Toyama

== Climate ==
Due to its elevation, the city has a Köppen climate classification Dfa climate. Winters are cold and very snowy, while summers are very warm and wet. The average annual temperature in Ōmachi is 9.7 °C (49.5 °F). The average annual rainfall is 1,405.9 mm (55.35 in) with July as the wettest month. The temperatures are highest on average in August, at around 22.4 °C (72.3 °F), and lowest in January, at around −2.8 °C (27.0 °F).

Climate data for Ōmachi (1991–2020 normals, extremes 1978–present)
Month	Jan	Feb	Mar	Apr	May	Jun	Jul	Aug	Sep	Oct	Nov	Dec	Year
Record high °C (°F)	13.7 (56.7)	18.0 (64.4)	26.0 (78.8)	28.2 (82.8)	31.9 (89.4)	34.6 (94.3)	35.5 (95.9)	35.5 (95.9)	34.7 (94.5)	28.2 (82.8)	24.0 (75.2)	18.3 (64.9)	35.5 (95.9)
Mean daily maximum °C (°F)	1.6 (34.9)	2.8 (37.0)	7.4 (45.3)	15.0 (59.0)	20.8 (69.4)	23.8 (74.8)	27.2 (81.0)	28.5 (83.3)	23.7 (74.7)	17.7 (63.9)	11.6 (52.9)	4.8 (40.6)	15.4 (59.7)
Daily mean °C (°F)	−2.8 (27.0)	−2.3 (27.9)	1.6 (34.9)	8.0 (46.4)	14.0 (57.2)	17.9 (64.2)	21.6 (70.9)	22.4 (72.3)	18.1 (64.6)	11.8 (53.2)	5.8 (42.4)	0.2 (32.4)	9.7 (49.5)
Mean daily minimum °C (°F)	−7.5 (18.5)	−7.4 (18.7)	−3.4 (25.9)	2.0 (35.6)	8.1 (46.6)	13.2 (55.8)	17.4 (63.3)	18.0 (64.4)	13.9 (57.0)	7.2 (45.0)	0.9 (33.6)	−3.9 (25.0)	4.9 (40.8)
Record low °C (°F)	−17.0 (1.4)	−18.0 (−0.4)	−14.5 (5.9)	−11.1 (12.0)	−1.2 (29.8)	3.6 (38.5)	10.3 (50.5)	9.0 (48.2)	2.0 (35.6)	−4.2 (24.4)	−7.6 (18.3)	−14.8 (5.4)	−18.0 (−0.4)
Average precipitation mm (inches)	84.7 (3.33)	78.1 (3.07)	100.1 (3.94)	98.1 (3.86)	111.5 (4.39)	159.4 (6.28)	195.3 (7.69)	136.1 (5.36)	165.0 (6.50)	129.1 (5.08)	69.8 (2.75)	78.8 (3.10)	1,406 (55.35)
Average snowfall cm (inches)	164 (65)	133 (52)	76 (30)	5 (2.0)	0 (0)	0 (0)	0 (0)	0 (0)	0 (0)	0 (0)	6 (2.4)	73 (29)	454 (179)
Average precipitation days (≥ 1.0 mm)	12.2	10.9	12.0	10.3	10.8	11.5	14.0	11.0	10.8	9.2	9.2	12.4	134.4
Mean monthly sunshine hours	107.2	125.3	163.4	185.1	198.4	146.6	137.4	169.4	118.9	137.6	132.2	108.6	1,730.1
Source: Japan Meteorological Agency (1991–2020 normals, extremes 1978–present)

== History ==
The area of present-day Ōmachi was part of ancient Shinano Province. The area was part of the holdings of Matsumoto Domain during the Edo period. The modern town of Ōmachi was established with the creation of the municipalities system on April 1, 1889. It merged with the neighboring villages of Taira, Tokiwa and Yashiro on July 1, 1954 to form the city of Ōmachi. On January 1, 2006, the villages of Miasa and Yasaka (both from Kitaazumi District) were merged into Ōmachi.

=== Demographics ===
Per Japanese census data, the population of Ōmachi has been declining over the past 40 years.

Historical population
Year	Pop.	±%
1960	41,185	—
1970	35,817	−13.0%
1980	36,083	+0.7%
1990	34,300	−4.9%
2000	33,550	−2.2%
2010	28,805	−14.1%
2020	26,029	−9.6%

== Government ==
Ōmachi has a mayor-council form of government with a directly elected mayor and a unicameral city legislature of 16 members. The city contributes one member to the Nagano Prefectural Assembly. In terms of national politics, Ōmachi is grouped with Matsumoto, Azumino, Higashichikuma District, Nagano, Kitaazumi District, Nagano, Kamiminochi District, Nagano and part of the city of Nagano to form Nagano 2nd District in the lower house of the National Diet.

== Economy ==
Ōmachi is a regional commercial center and a producer of aluminum, cotton thread and rice. Seasonal tourism to the mountains is also an important source of local income.

== Education ==
Ōmachi has five public elementary schools, three public middle schools and one combined elementary/middle school operated by the city government. There are two public high schools operated by the Nagano Prefectural Board of Education.

== Transportation ==
=== Railway ===
- East Japan Railway Company - Ōito Line
  - Azumi-Kutsukake - Shinano-Tokiwa - Minami-Ōmachi - Shinano-Ōmachi - Kita-Ōmachi - Shinano-Kizaki - Inao - Uminokuchi - Yanaba - Yanaba-Ski-jō-mae
- Kansai Electric Power Company
  - Kanden Tunnel Trolleybus

=== Highway ===
- National Route 19
- National Route 147
- National Route 148
- National Route 406

== International relations ==
- - Innsbruck, Austria, since November 20, 1972
- - Mendocino, California, United States since May 1980

== Local attractions ==
- Nishina Shinmei Shrine, a National Treasure
- Ōmachi Alpine Museum
- Ōmachi Dam
- Shin-Takasegawa Pumped Storage Station
