= Inao Station =

Railway station in Ōmachi, Nagano Prefecture, Japan

Ōito Line20 Inao Station 稲尾駅
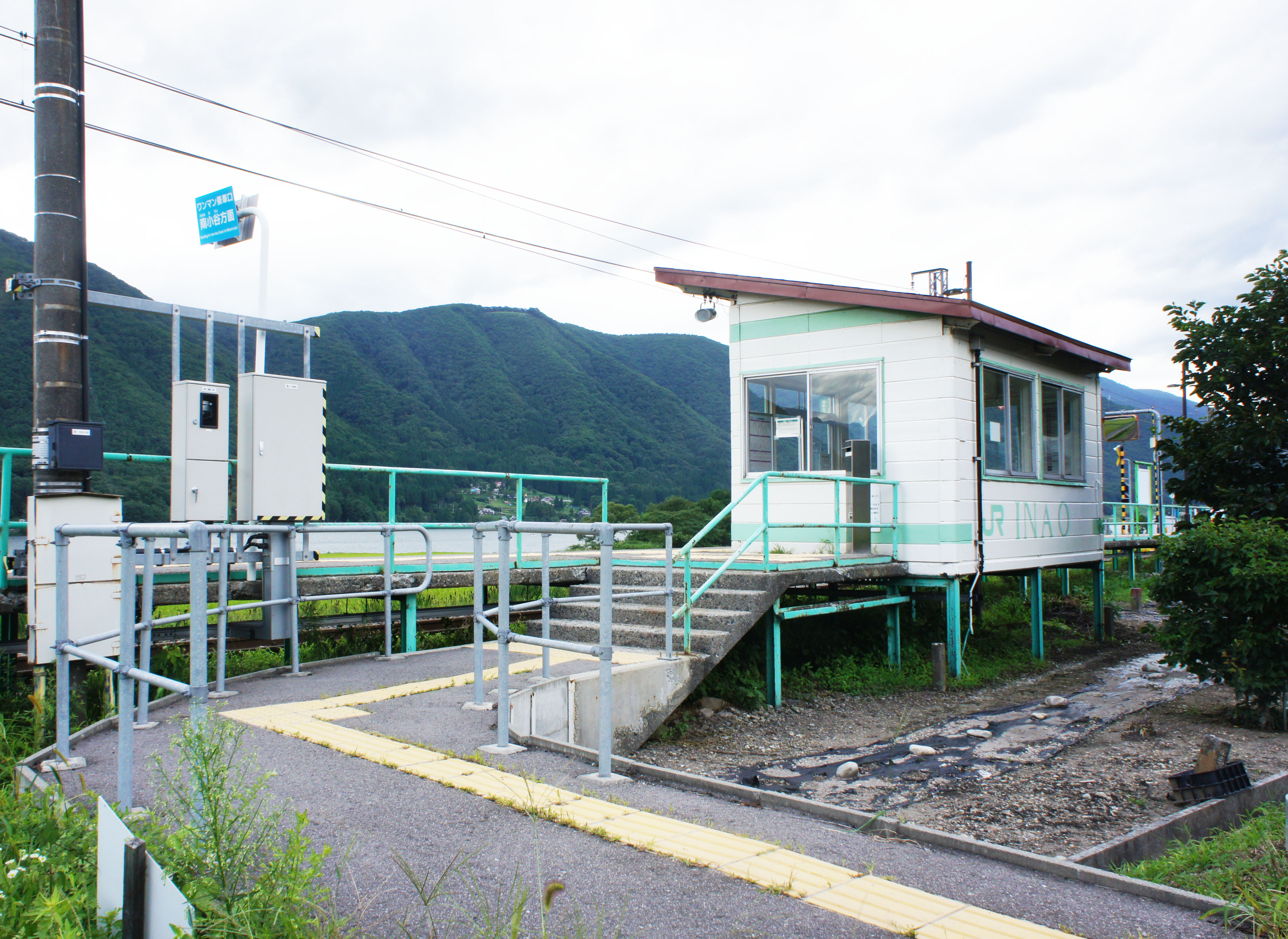
- Inao Station, August 2021

General information
- Location: Taira-Inao, Ōmachi-shi, Nagano-ken 398-0001; Japan
- Coordinates: 36°33′15.53″N 137°50′33.36″E
- Elevation: 769.7 meters
- Operator: JR East
- Line: ■ Ōito Line
- Distance: 41.6 km from Matsumoto
- Platforms: 1 side platform

Other information
- Status: Unstaffed
- Station code: 20
- Website: Official website

History
- Opened: 20 July 1960; 66 years ago

Passengers
- FY2011: 6

Services
| Preceding station | JR East | Following station |
|---|---|---|
| Uminokuchi 19 towards Minami-Otari | Ōito Line Local | Shinano-Kizaki 21 towards Matsumoto |
Location
- Location within Nagano Prefecture Location within Japan

Inao Station (稲尾駅, Inao-eki) is a railway station in the city of Ōmachi, Nagano, Japan, operated by East Japan Railway Company (JR East).

== Lines ==
Inao Station is served by the Ōito Line and is 41.6 kilometers from the terminus of the line at Matsumoto Station.

== Station layout ==
The station consists of one ground-level side platform serving a single bi-directional track. The platform is short, and can only accommodate three carriage trains. The station is unattended.

== History ==
Inao Station opened on 20 July 1960. With the privatization of Japanese National Railways (JNR) on 1 April 1987, the station came under the control of JR East.

== Surrounding area ==
- Lake Kizaki
- National Route 148

== See also ==
- List of railway stations in Japan
