= Lake Kizaki =

Lake Kizaki 木崎湖
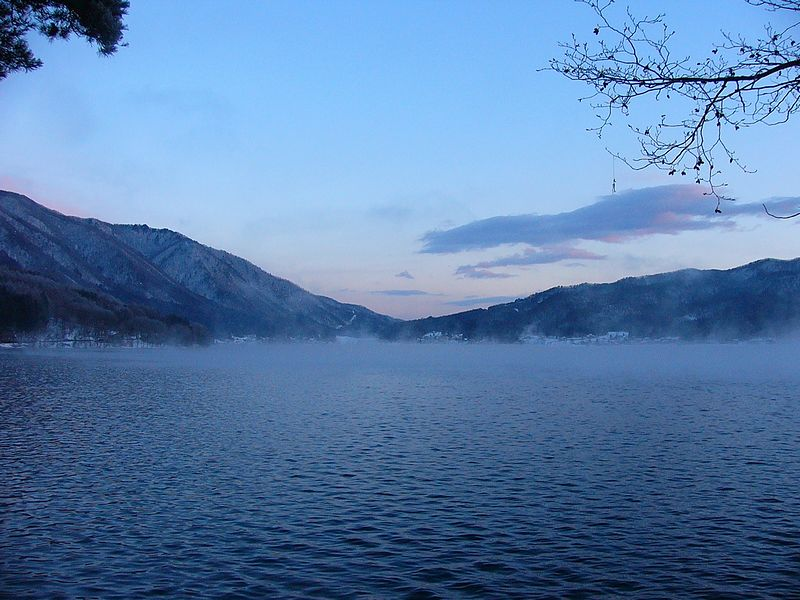
- Lake Kizaki, during winter

- Location within Japan
- Coordinates: 36°33′N 137°50′E
- Type: Mesotrophic lake
- Catchment area: 22 km^{2} (8.5 sq mi)
- Basin countries: Japan
- Max. length: 2.7 km (1.7 mi)
- Max. width: 1.2 km (0.75 mi)
- Surface area: 1.4 km^{2} (0.54 sq mi)
- Average depth: 17.9 m (59 ft)
- Max. depth: 29.5 m (97 ft)
- Water volume: 0.025 km^{3} (20,000 acre⋅ft)
- Shore length^{1}: 7 km (4.3 mi)
- Surface elevation: 764 m (2,507 ft)
- Islands: None
- Settlements: Near Ōmachi, Nagano
- ^{1} Shore length is not a well-defined measure.

Lake Kizaki (木崎湖, Kizaki-ko) is a lake, situated near Ōmachi, Nagano, Japan, and located at the foot of the northern Japanese Alps mountain range. Mesotrophic and subalpine in nature, numerous lakeside attractions surround the lake, with the locale being a popular lakeside resort. Kizaki is also one of the "Nishina Three Lakes", which include Lake Aoki and Lake Nakatsuna.

== Geography ==
Lake Kizaki has a maximum length of 2.7 km and a maximum width of 1.2 km, with the altitude of its surface reaching 764 m and its catchment area being 22 square kilometers.

== Transport ==
There are three train stations located near Kizaki Lake: Shinano-Kizaki, Inao, and Uminokuchi, all on the JR Ōito Line.

== See also ==
- Onegai Teacher, also known as Please Teacher!, anime series which is set in Lake Kizaki and features the lake comprehensively, as well as numerous locations across the region.
- Onegai Twins, also known as Please Twins!, anime series, sequel to Onegai Teacher, which is set in Lake Kizaki and features the lake prominently, with the main storyline featuring the lake comprehensively. as well as numerous locations across the region.
- Waiting in the Summer, also known as Ano Natsu De Matteru, anime series, with screenwriter Yōsuke Kuroda and character designer Taraku Uon whom both took part in the original Please! series, although does not take part in the same setting as above two series, Lake Kizaki plays a significant role in the plot.
