= Yanaba Station =

Railway station in Ōmachi, Nagano Prefecture, Japan

Ōito Line18 Yanaba Station 簗場駅
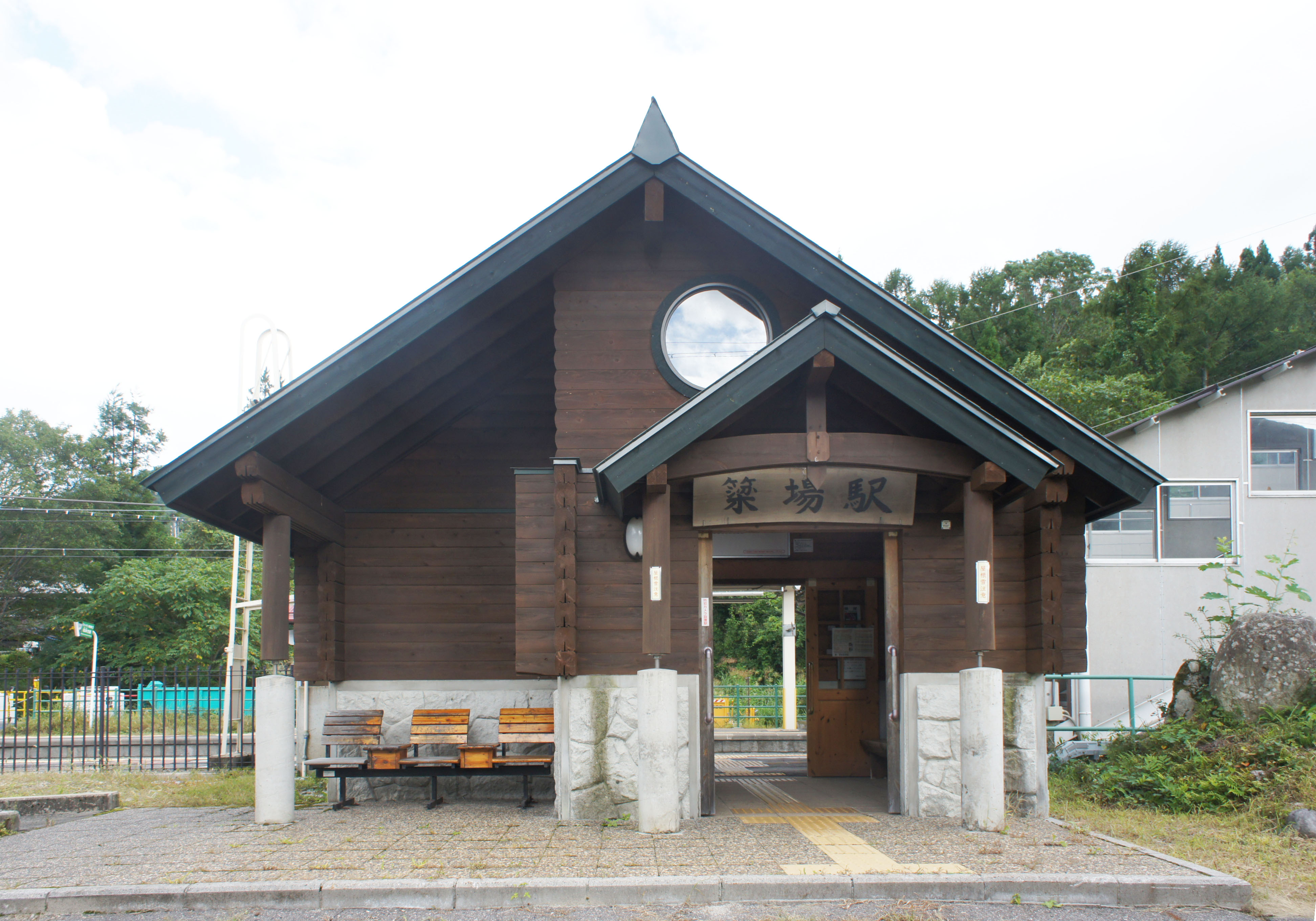
- Yanaba Station, August 2021

General information
- Location: 20329 Nakatsuna Taira, Ōmachi-shi, Nagano-ken 398-0001; Japan
- Coordinates: 36.5947°N 137.8450°E
- Elevation: 827.2 meters
- Operator: JR East
- Line: ■ Ōito Line
- Distance: 46.3 km from Matsumoto
- Platforms: 2 side platforms

Other information
- Status: Unstaffed
- Station code: 18
- Website: Official website

History
- Opened: 25 September 1929; 96 years ago

Passengers
- FY2011: 23

Services
Preceding station	JR East	Following station
Kamishiro One-way operation	Ōito Line Rapid	Shinano-Kizaki 21 towards Shinano-Ōmachi
Minami-Kamishiro 16 towards Minami-Otari	Ōito Line Local	Uminokuchi 19 towards Matsumoto
Former services
Preceding station	JR East	Following station
Yanaba-Ski-jō-mae 17 towards Minami-Otari	Ōito Line Local	Uminokuchi 19 towards Matsumoto
Location
- Location within Nagano Prefecture Location within Japan

Yanaba Station (簗場駅, Yanaba-eki) is a railway station in the city of Ōmachi, Nagano, Japan, operated by East Japan Railway Company (JR East).

== Lines ==
Yanaba Station is served by the Ōito Line and is 46.3 kilometers from the terminus of the line at Matsumoto Station.

== Station layout ==
The station consists of two ground-level opposed side platforms connected by a footbridge. The station is unattended.

=== Platforms ===
1	■ Ōito Line	for Hakuba and Minami-Otari
2	■ Ōito Line	for Shinano-Ōmachi, Hotaka, Toyoshina and Matsumoto

== History ==
Yanaba Station opened on 25 September 1929. With the privatization of Japanese National Railways (JNR) on 1 April 1987, the station came under the control of JR East.

== Surrounding area ==
- National Route 148

== See also ==
- List of railway stations in Japan
