= Uminokuchi Station =

Railway station in Ōmachi, Nagano Prefecture, Japan

Ōito Line19 Uminokuchi Station 海ノ口駅
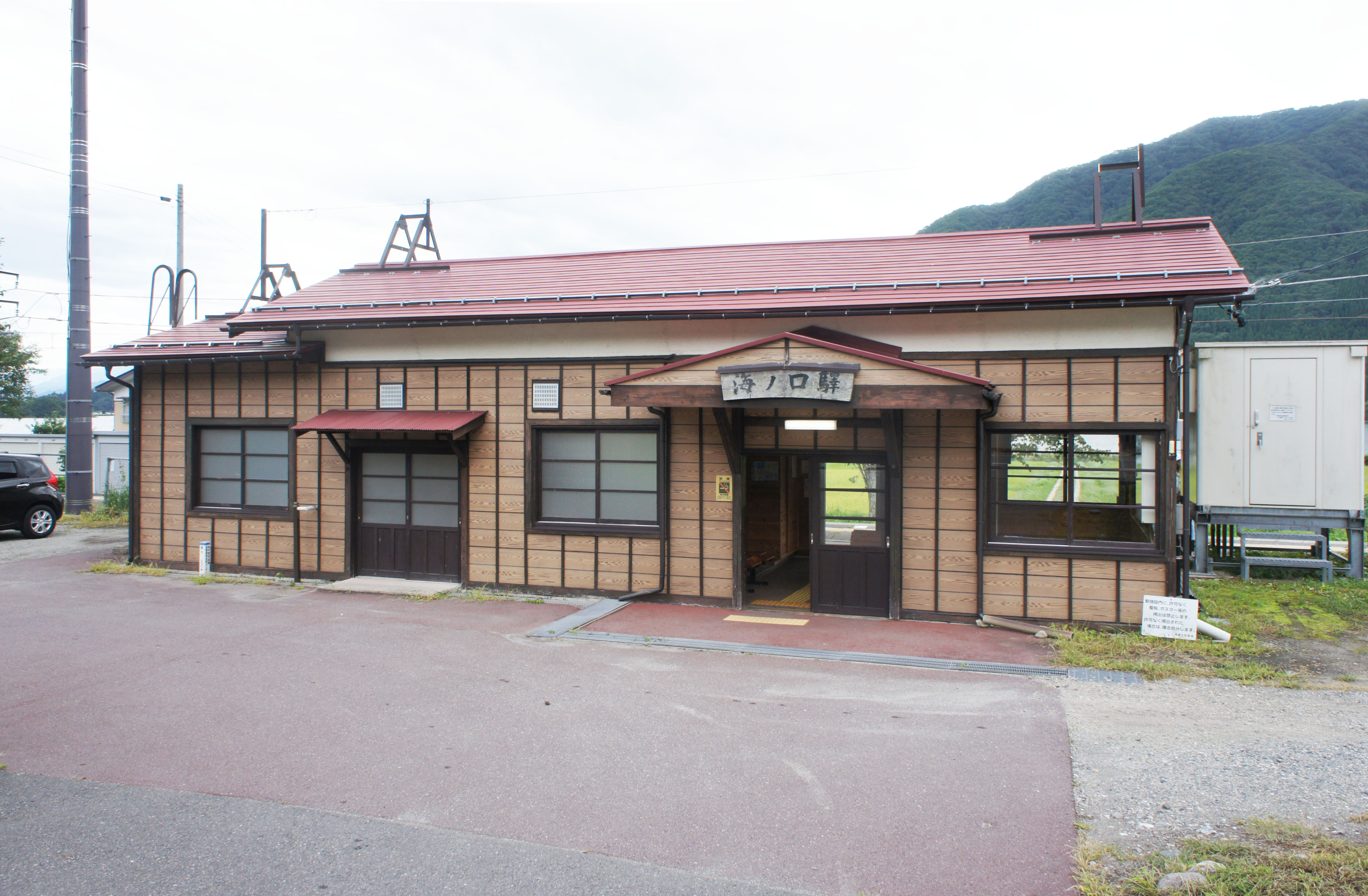
- Uminokuchi Station, August 2021

General information
- Location: 20329 Taira-Nakatsuna, Ōmachi-shi, Nagano-ken 398-0001; Japan
- Coordinates: 36°33′56.32″N 137°50′30.94″E
- Elevation: 766.5 meters
- Operator: JR East
- Line: ■ Ōito Line
- Distance: 42.9 km from Matsumoto
- Platforms: 1 side platform

Other information
- Status: Unstaffed
- Station code: 19
- Website: Official website

History
- Opened: 25 September 1929; 96 years ago

Passengers
- FY2011: 16

Services
Preceding station	JR East	Following station
Yanaba 18 towards Minami-Otari	Ōito Line Local	Inao 20 towards Matsumoto
Location
- Location within Nagano Prefecture Location within Japan

Uminokuchi Station (海ノ口駅, Uminokuchi-eki) is a railway station in the city of Ōmachi, Nagano, Japan, operated by the East Japan Railway Company (JR East).

== Lines ==
Uminokuchi Station is served by the Ōito Line and is 42.9 kilometers from the terminus of the line at Matsumoto Station.

== Station layout ==
The station consists of one ground-level side platform serving a single bi-directional track. The platform is short, and can only accommodate three carriage trains. The station is unattended.

== History ==
Uminokuchi Station opened on 25 September 1929. With the privatization of Japanese National Railways (JNR) on 1 April 1987, the station came under the control of JR East.

== Surrounding area ==
- Lake Kizaki
- National Route 148

== See also ==
- List of railway stations in Japan
