= Yanabaskijōmae Station =

Railway station in Ōmachi, Nagano Prefecture, Japan

Ōito Line17 Yanaba Skiing Ground Station ヤナバスキー場前駅
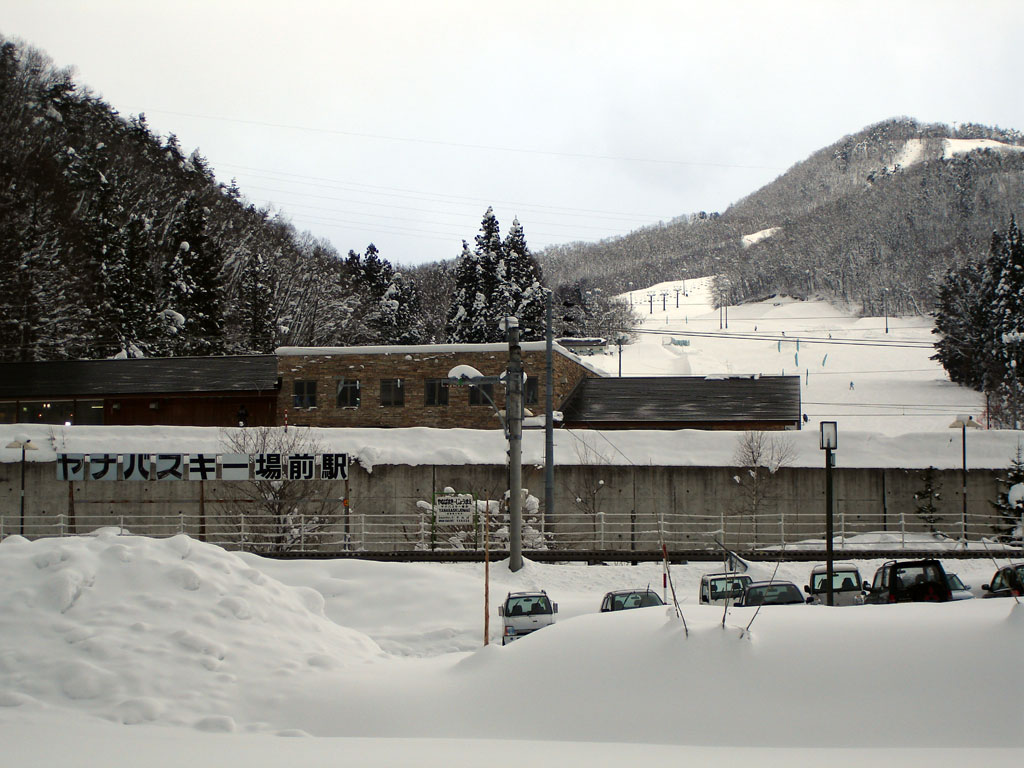
- Yanaba Skiing Ground Station, December 2005

General information
- Location: 22548 Taira-Yanaba, Ōmachi-shi, Nagano-ken 398-000; Japan
- Coordinates: 36.6057°N 137.8551°E
- Elevation: 828.4 meters
- Operator: JR East
- Line: ■ Ōito Line
- Distance: 47.9 km from Matsumoto
- Platforms: 1 side platform

Other information
- Status: Unstaffed
- Station code: 17

History
- Opened: 24 December 1985
- Closed: 16 March 2019

Former services
Preceding station	JR East	Following station
Minami-Kamishiro 16 towards Minami-Otari	Ōito Line Local	Yanaba 18 towards Matsumoto
Location
- Location within Nagano Prefecture Location within Japan

Yanaba Skiing Ground Station (ヤナバスキー場前駅, Yanabasukījōmae-eki) was a railway station in the city of Ōmachi, Nagano, Japan, operated by East Japan Railway Company (JR East). This station was a seasonal station, which was open from December to March. The station closed permanently on 16 March 2019.

== Lines ==
Yanaba Skiing Ground Station was served by the Ōito Line and was 47.9 kilometers from the terminus of the line at Matsumoto Station.

== Station layout ==
The station consisted of one ground-level side platform. The station was unattended.

== History ==
Yanaba Skiing Ground Station opened on 24 December 1985. With the privatization of Japanese National Railways (JNR) on 1 April 1987, the station came under the control of JR East.

== Surrounding area ==
- Yanaba Skiing Ground
- National Route 148

== See also ==
- List of railway stations in Japan
