= Otari, Nagano =

Otari 小谷村
- Village
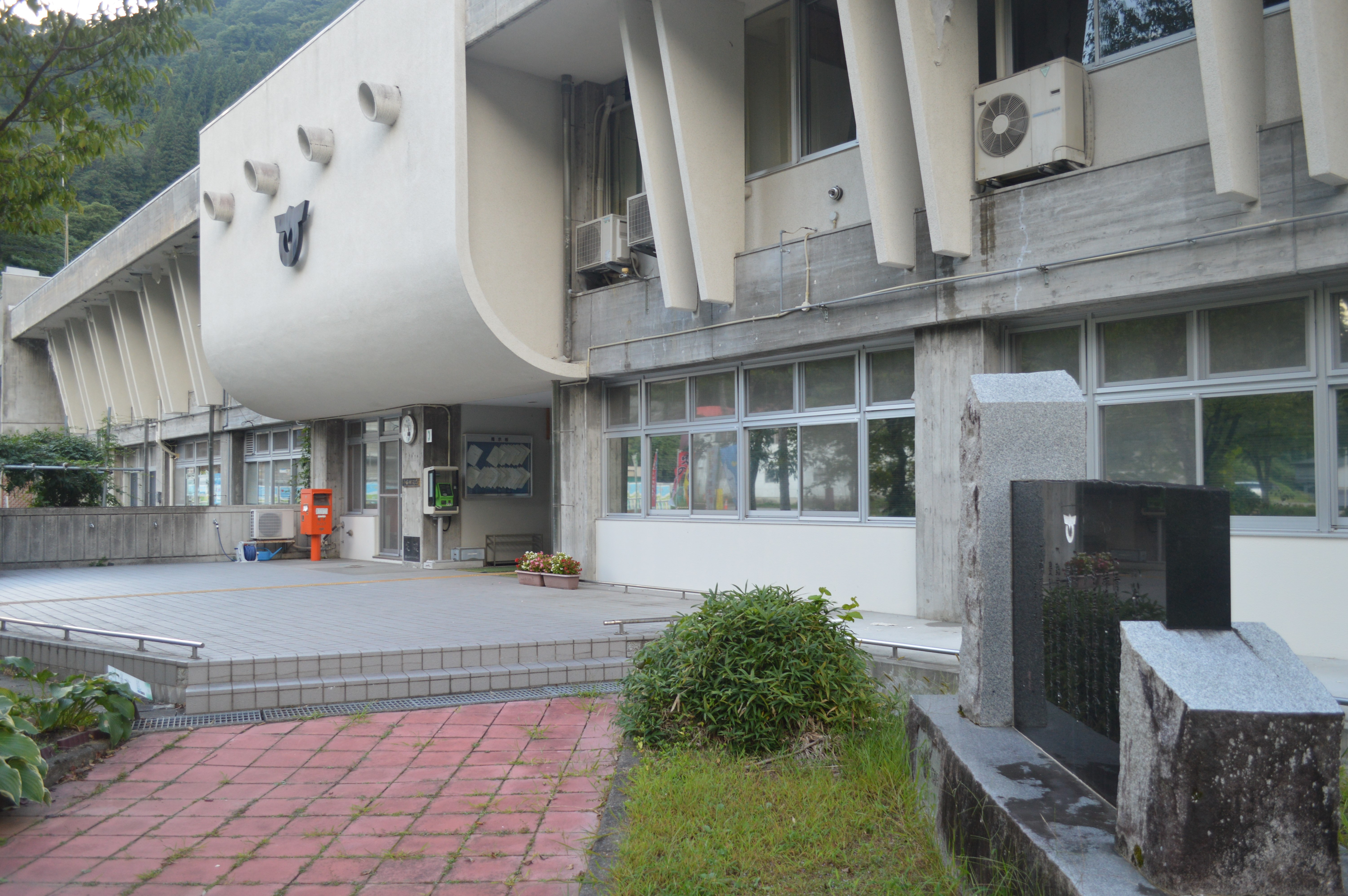
- Otari Village Hall

- Flag Seal

- Location of Otari in Nagano Prefecture

- Coordinates: 36°46′44.6″N 137°54′29.7″E
- Country: Japan
- Region: Chūbu (Kōshin'etsu)
- Prefecture: Nagano
- District: Kitaazumi

Government
  - Mayor: Matsumoto Hisashi

Area
  - Total: 267.91 km^{2} (103.44 sq mi)

Population (November 2018)
  - Total: 2,914
  - Density: 10.88/km^{2} (28.17/sq mi)
- Time zone: UTC+9 (Japan Standard Time)
- Symbols
  - Tree: Fagus crenata
  - Flower: Prunus sargentii
- Phone number: 0261-82-2001
- Address: 131 Nakaotari, Otari-mura, Kitaazumi-gun, Nagano-ken 399-9494
- Website: Official website

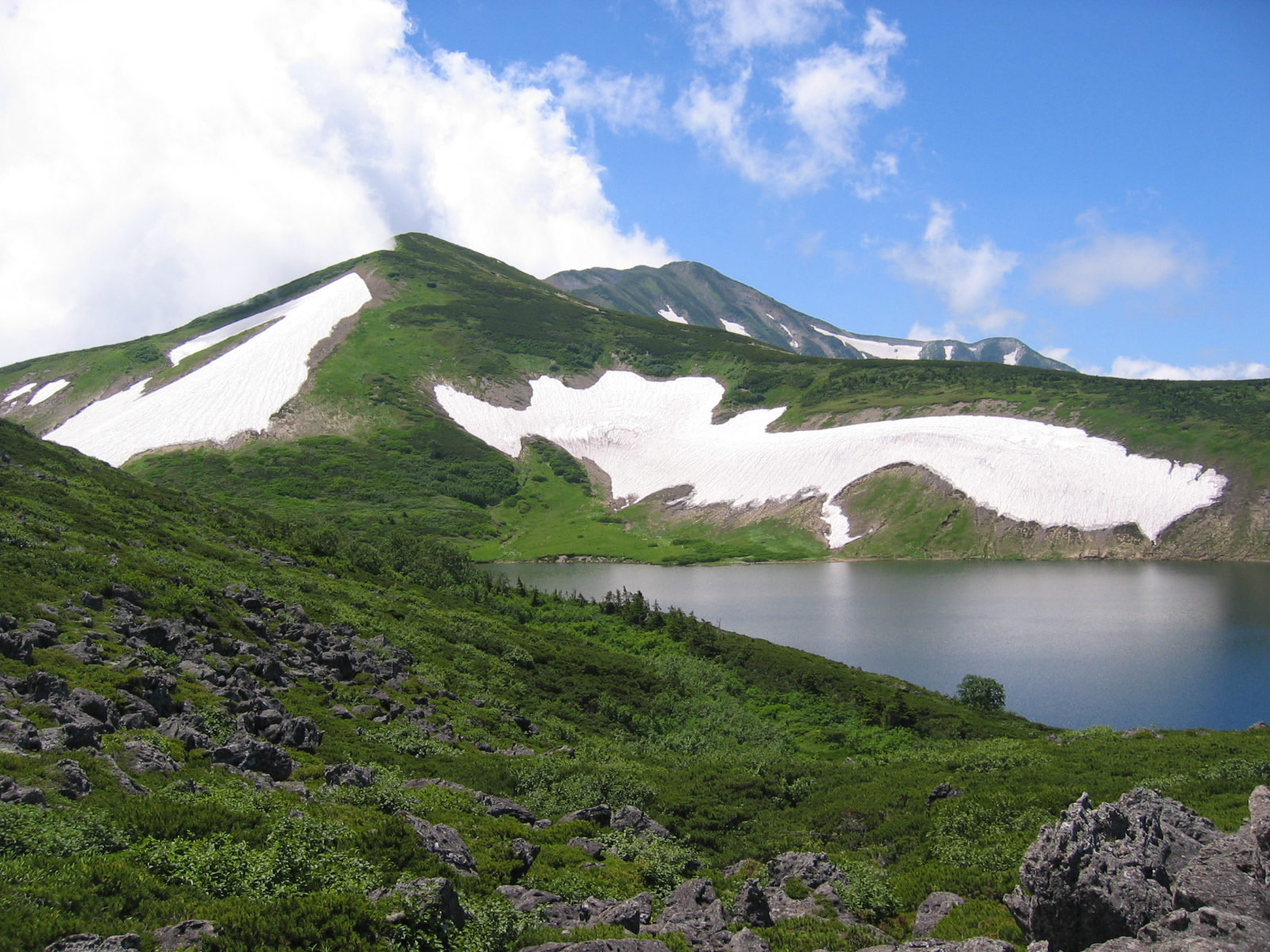
Hakuba Oike in Otari

Otari (小谷村, Otari-mura) is a village located in Nagano Prefecture, Japan. As of 30 November 2018, the village had an estimated population of 2,914 in 1251 households, and a population density of 11 persons per km^{2}. The total area of the village is 267.91 square kilometres (103.44 sq mi).

== Geography ==
Otari is located in the mountainous far northwestern Nagano Prefecture, bordered by Niigata Prefecture to the north and west. Much of the village is within the borders of the Chūbu-Sangaku National Park or the Myōkō-Togakushi Renzan National Park.

=== Surrounding municipalities ===
- Nagano Prefecture
  - Hakuba
  - Nagano
- Niigata Prefecture
  - Itoigawa
  - Myōkō

=== Climate ===
The village has a climate characterized by hot and humid summers, and cold winters (Köppen climate classification Dfa). The average annual temperature in Otari is 10.4 °C. The average annual rainfall is 1420 mm with September as the wettest month. The temperatures are highest on average in August, at around 23.7 °C, and lowest in January, at around -2.1 °C.

== Demographics ==
Per Japanese census data, the population of Otari has decreased considerably over the past 70 years.

Historical population
Year	Pop.	±%
1940	8,243	—
1950	8,279	+0.4%
1960	7,917	−4.4%
1970	5,893	−25.6%
1980	5,165	−12.4%
1990	4,474	−13.4%
2000	4,276	−4.4%
2010	3,225	−24.6%
2020	2,647	−17.9%

== History ==
The area of present-day Otari was part of ancient Shinano Province and was part of the territory controlled by Matsumoto Domain under the Tokugawa shogunate of the Edo period. The modern village of Otari was established on April 1, 1954 by the merger of the villages of Minami-Otari, Kita-Otari and Nakatsuchi.

== Education ==
Otari has one public elementary school and one public middle school operated by the village government. The village does not have a high school.

== Transportation ==
=== Railway ===
- East Japan Railway Company – Ōito Line
  - Hakuba-Ōike - Chikuni - Minami-Otari
- West Japan Railway Company – Ōito Line
  - Minami-Otari - Nakatsuchi - Kita-Otari

=== Highway ===
- National Route 148

== International relations ==
- – Marlborough, New Zealand, sister city since January 16, 1991
- - Ottery St. Mary, Devon, United Kingdom, friendship city since May 4, 1992
