= Hakuba =

Hakuba 白馬村
- Village
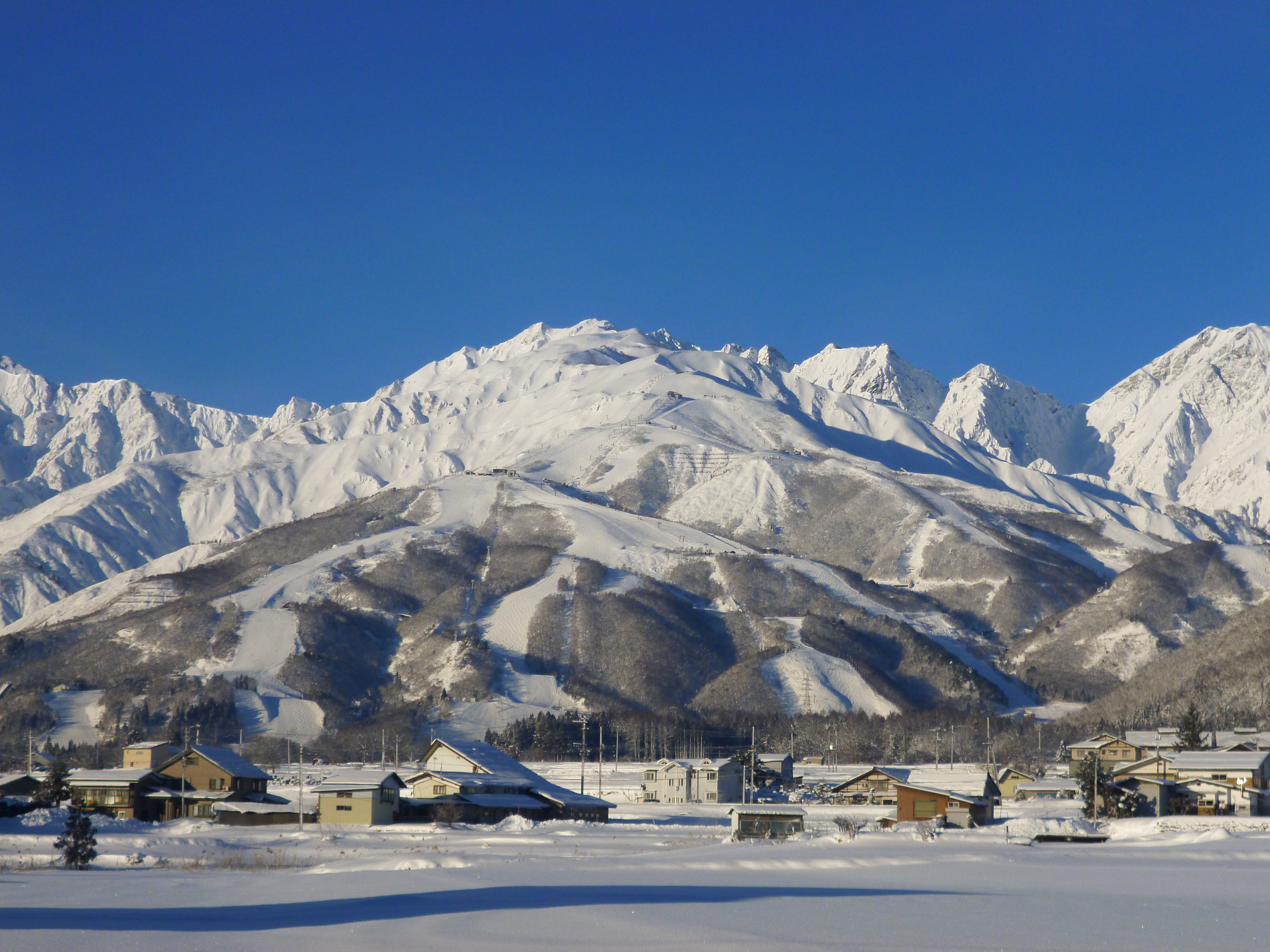
- Hakuba in winter

- Flag Seal

- Location of Hakuba in Nagano Prefecture

- Coordinates: 36°41′53″N 137°51′42.9″E
- Country: Japan
- Region: Chūbu (Kōshin'etsu)
- Prefecture: Nagano
- District: Kitaazumi

Area
  - Total: 189.36 km^{2} (73.11 sq mi)

Population (April 2019)
  - Total: 9,007
  - Density: 47.57/km^{2} (123.2/sq mi)
- Time zone: UTC+9 (Japan Standard Time)
- Phone number: 0261-72-5000
- Address: 7025 Hokujo, Hakuba-mura, Kitaazumi-gun, Nagano-ken 399-9393
- Climate: Dfa
- Website: www.vill.hakuba.nagano.jp
- Symbols
- Flower: Erythronium japonicum
- Tree: Prunus sargentii and Magnolia kobus

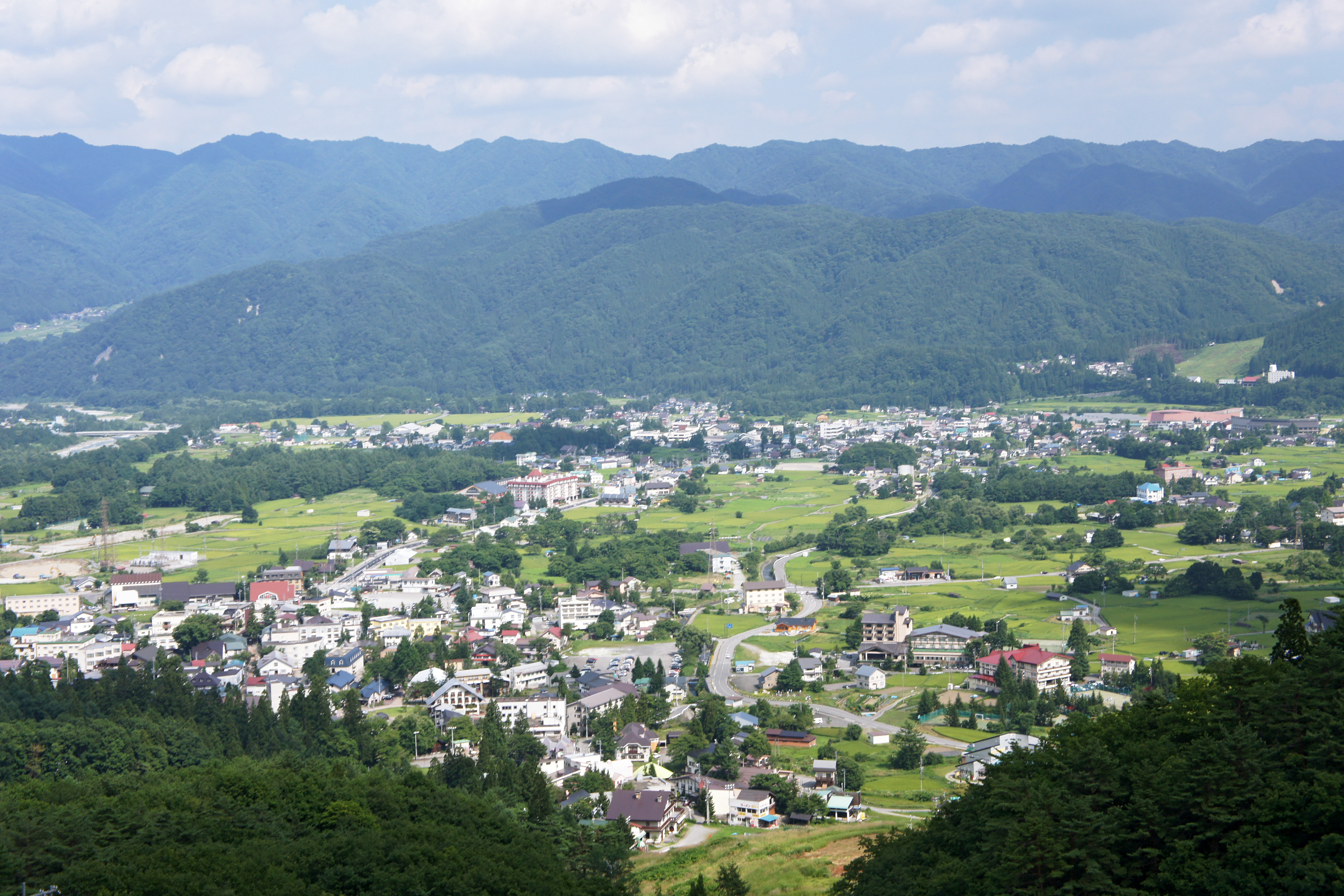
Hakuba Village view from Happo-one

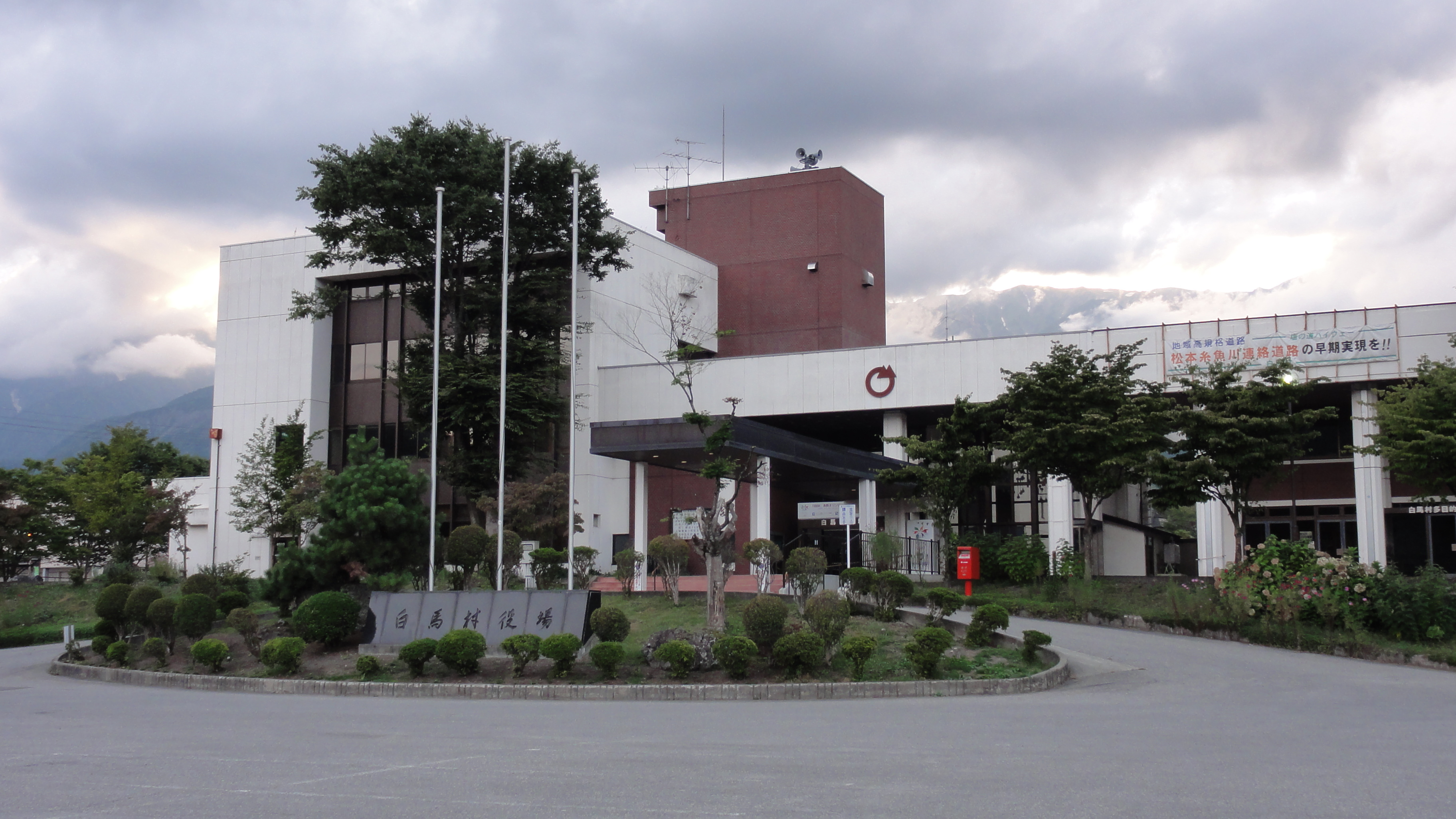
Hakuba Village Hall

Hakuba (白馬村, Hakuba-mura; HAH-koo-bah) is a village located in Nagano Prefecture, Japan. As of September 2026, the village had an estimated population of 8,167 in 4,269 households and a population density of 48 persons per km^{2}. The total area of the village is 189.36 square kilometres (73.11 sq mi). Hakuba is located in the eastern foothills of the Hida Mountains in the northern part of the Japanese Alps and is a popular ski resort. It is also the starting point for trekking Mount Shirouma and Mount Goryu, two of the One Hundred Mountains of Japan. The Hakuba Valley receives an average annual snow fall of 655 cm (258 inches). The 2024–25 winter season in Hakuba holds the record for the highest snowfall in a single winter, with a total accumulation of 782 cm. Hakuba is the central hub for 10 ski resorts with more than 200 runs. The village was the main event venue for 1998 Winter Olympics (Alpine, Ski Jump, Crosscountry).

== Etymology ==
The name Hakuba (白馬) literally means “white horse”. It derives from Mount Shirouma (白馬岳), the peak on the village’s western edge. Each spring, as the snow melts, exposed rock on the mountain forms the outline of a horse. Its appearance traditionally signaled the season for shirokaki (代掻き), the puddling of flooded paddies before planting rice, and the mountain came to be called Mount Shirouma (代馬岳, lit. “paddy-preparation horse mountain”). The character 代 (shiro) was later replaced by the homophonous 白 (shiro, “white”). The mountain retains its native Japanese (kun’yomi) pronunciation, Shirouma, while Hakuba is the corresponding Sino-Japanese (on’yomi) pronunciation.

The village's mascot, Victoire Cheval Blanc Murao III, is a white horse, in a nod to the literal meaning of the town's name. Cheval blanc is French for "white horse".

== Geography ==
Hakuba is located in a mountain basin in far northwestern Nagano Prefecture, bordered by Toyama Prefecture to the west. The 2900 meter Ushiro-Tateyama Mountains border the village to the west. Much of the village is within the borders of the Chūbu-Sangaku National Park.

=== Surrounding municipalities ===
- Nagano Prefecture
  - Nagano
  - Ogawa
  - Ōmachi
  - Otari
- Niigata Prefecture
  - Itoigawa
- Toyama Prefecture
  - Asahi
  - Kurobe

=== Climate ===
The village has humid continental climate (Köppen Dfa), with cold, extremely snowy winters, and warm, rainy summers. With temperatures cooled by the elevation, monthly 24-hour average temperature ranges from −2.8 °C (27.0 °F) in January to 22.6 °C (72.7 °F) in July. Hakuba receives 6 meters of snowfall annually, with most snowfall occurring in the months of January and February.

Climate data for Hakuba (1991−2020 normals, extremes 1978−present)
Month	Jan	Feb	Mar	Apr	May	Jun	Jul	Aug	Sep	Oct	Nov	Dec	Year
Record high °C (°F)	13.2 (55.8)	16.9 (62.4)	22.9 (73.2)	28.6 (83.5)	32.3 (90.1)	33.1 (91.6)	34.6 (94.3)	36.2 (97.2)	33.8 (92.8)	27.7 (81.9)	24.2 (75.6)	18.3 (64.9)	36.2 (97.2)
Mean daily maximum °C (°F)	1.4 (34.5)	2.6 (36.7)	7.0 (44.6)	14.6 (58.3)	20.8 (69.4)	23.6 (74.5)	27.0 (80.6)	28.4 (83.1)	23.6 (74.5)	17.7 (63.9)	11.5 (52.7)	4.5 (40.1)	15.2 (59.4)
Daily mean °C (°F)	−2.8 (27.0)	−2.4 (27.7)	1.2 (34.2)	7.6 (45.7)	13.8 (56.8)	17.7 (63.9)	21.5 (70.7)	22.6 (72.7)	18.2 (64.8)	11.9 (53.4)	5.5 (41.9)	−0.1 (31.8)	9.6 (49.2)
Mean daily minimum °C (°F)	−7.2 (19.0)	−7.3 (18.9)	−3.6 (25.5)	1.7 (35.1)	7.8 (46.0)	13.1 (55.6)	17.7 (63.9)	18.5 (65.3)	14.3 (57.7)	7.4 (45.3)	0.9 (33.6)	−4.0 (24.8)	4.9 (40.9)
Record low °C (°F)	−18.7 (−1.7)	−18.6 (−1.5)	−15.9 (3.4)	−12.4 (9.7)	−1.3 (29.7)	2.8 (37.0)	10.12 (50.22)	9.1 (48.4)	2.7 (36.9)	−3.5 (25.7)	−11.2 (11.8)	−16.4 (2.5)	−18.7 (−1.7)
Average precipitation mm (inches)	141.5 (5.57)	125.9 (4.96)	136.2 (5.36)	126.4 (4.98)	135.0 (5.31)	211.4 (8.32)	280.8 (11.06)	177.7 (7.00)	181.9 (7.16)	136.5 (5.37)	100.4 (3.95)	135.6 (5.34)	1,889.2 (74.38)
Average snowfall cm (inches)	216 (85)	174 (69)	110 (43)	7 (2.8)	0 (0)	0 (0)	0 (0)	0 (0)	0 (0)	0 (0)	14 (5.5)	130 (51)	655 (258)
Average precipitation days (≥ 1.0 mm)	17.2	14.5	14.3	11.7	11.9	12.8	16.3	12.3	11.9	10.3	11.5	16.5	161.2
Average snowy days (≥ 3 cm)	19.3	17.2	12.9	0.9	0	0	0	0	0	0	1.2	10.3	61.8
Mean monthly sunshine hours	71.3	96.1	136.9	169.6	193.8	146.1	138.8	169.1	118.8	128.6	112.1	75.0	1,556.2
Source: Japan Meteorological Agency

== History ==
The area of present-day Hakuba was part of ancient Shinano Province and was part of the territory controlled by Matsumoto Domain under the Tokugawa shogunate of the Edo period. Hakuba was once part of the route called the Salt Road used to bring salt and other marine products from the coast at Itoigawa in Echigo Province (now Niigata Prefecture). However, much of the area was still virgin forest well into the Meiji period, and a census in 1881 counted only 31 households.

The modern village of Hakuba was established on September 30, 1956 by the merger of the villages of Hokujo and Kamishiro.

Hakuba and surrounding municipalities were impacted by a reported 6.7 magnitude earthquake on 22 November 2014. The quake hit at 10:08 pm at a depth of 5 km causing a number of residential properties to collapse and injuring at least 41 people. Despite some localized road damage and a suspension of rail services on sections of the Ōito Line, there was however no major impact on hotels or ski tourism related infrastructure.

== Demographics ==
Per Japanese census data, the population of Hakuba peaked around the year 2000 and has declined since.

Historical population
Year	Pop.	±%
1960	6,559	—
1970	7,421	+13.1%
1960	6,923	−6.7%
1970	6,292	−9.1%
1980	7,131	+13.3%
1990	8,356	+17.2%
2000	9,492	+13.6%
2010	9,207	−3.0%
2020	8,575	−6.9%

== Economy ==
The economy of Hakuba is heavily dependent on seasonal tourism.

== Education ==
Hakuba has two public elementary schools and one public middle school operated by the village government. The village has one public high school operated by the Nagano Prefectural Board of Education.

Hakuba International School will be the newest school within the region. The international school is a boarding school which allows students from Japan to experience the tranquility and adventure Hakuba has to offer. The school follows the International Baccalaureate system which helps students focus on global issues such as living sustainably.

== Transportation ==
=== Railway ===
- East Japan Railway Company – Ōito Line
  - Minami-Kamishiro - Kamishiro - Iimori - Hakuba - Shinano-Moriue

=== Highway ===
- National Route 148
- National Route 406

== International relations ==
- – Oberwiesenthal, Germany, sister city
- – Lech am Arlberg, Austria, sister city

== Local attractions ==
Surrounded by the Sea of Japan (northward), Nagano City (eastward) and the Tateyama Kurobe Dam area (southward), Hakuba is also a popular summer vacation area which offers a variety of outdoor activities at an altitude of 700–800 metres, e.g. hiking, rafting/shower climbing, paragliding, mountain bike, bird sighting etc. Other day activities to enjoy include visiting the snow monkeys, kimono experiences, Taiko drumming, traditional cooking classes, Matsumoto castle tours and more.

=== Ski resorts ===
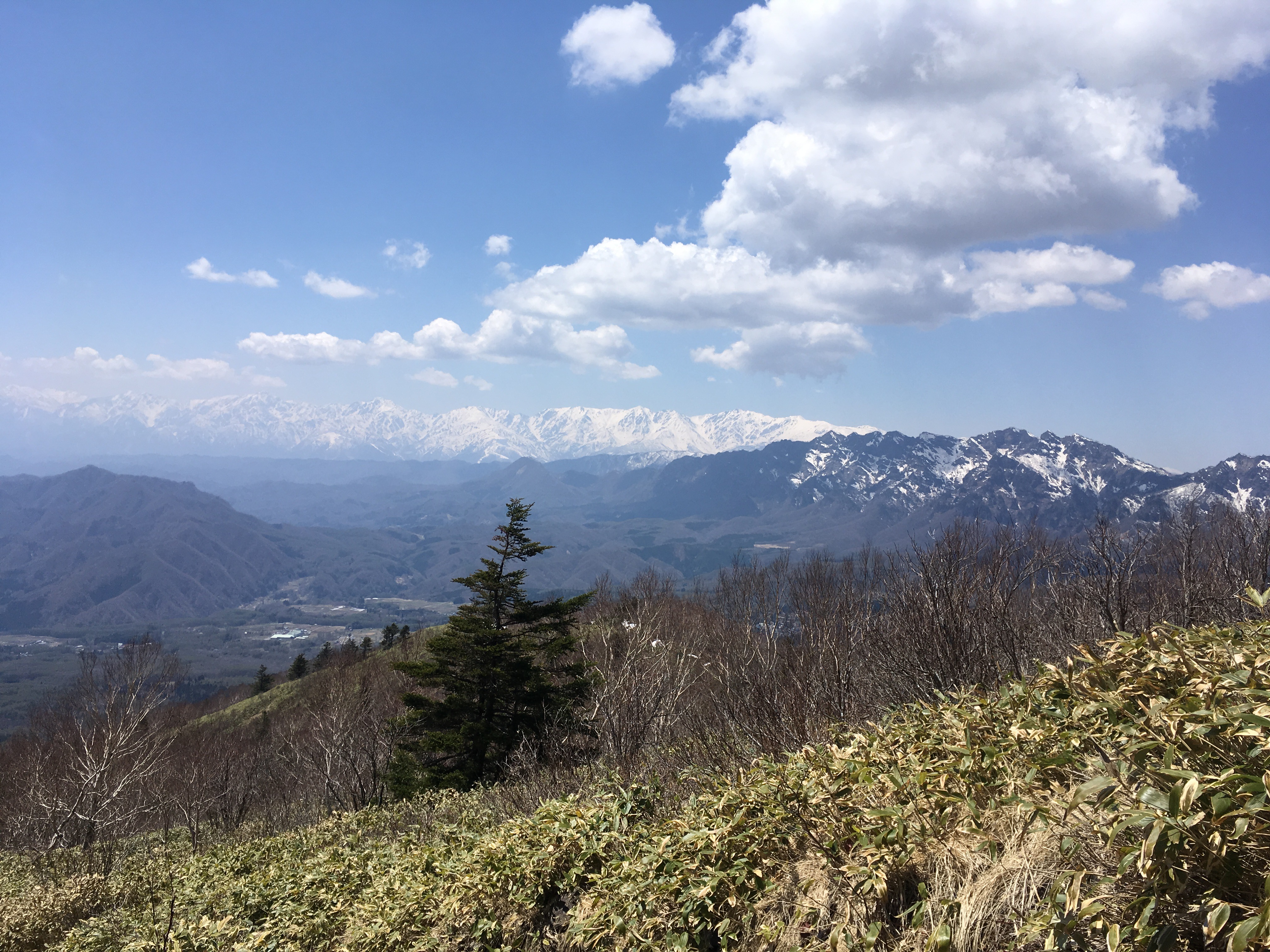
The mountains surrounding Hakuba Village in the background (Nishidake and Honindake in the foreground)

The Hakuba Valley (which also includes the neighboring city of Ōmachi and village of Otari) is home to 10 resorts, including 135 lifts (inc. 5 gondolas) accessing over 200 runs that offer an expanse of terrain and at least 14 terrain parks. There are 960 hectares of skiable terrain which equates to 137 km of piste. The Hakuba ski resorts are not interconnected via the slopes (except for Hakuba 47 and Goryu, and Cortina and Norikura), but they can be accessed off a common lift ticket and there are free shuttle buses to get around to the different ski areas. The ski resorts from north to south are: Cortina, Norikura, Tsugaike Kogen, Iwatake, Happo-One, Hakuba 47 (ja), Goryu, Sanosaka, Kashimayari and Jigatake.

Hakuba offers varied forms of skiing across the resorts but it is generally suited for beginners and intermediates with many long groomed runs and fall-lines. There's also some back country skiing on offer.

Hakuba has lessons and guiding available through both traditional Japanese ski schools and International ski schools including Hakuba Ski Concierge, Evergreen International Ski School, Happo-one Ski and Snowboard School, Hakuba Snow Sports School and Hakuba 47 Ski Academy International.

During the winter, many athletes go to the Hakuba Ski Jumping Stadium to challenge themselves with the 90-meter and 120-meter jumps they offer. The stadium provides activities for all skill levels.

== In popular culture ==
- The ski resorts and village of Hakuba were the setting for the 2008 Japanese film "Gin Iro No Shiizun" (銀色のシーズン).
- Hakuba is shown in episodes 21 and 22 of the anime Great Teacher Onizuka.
- Hakuba is where Soma Cruz from Castlevania: Aria of Sorrow and Castlevania: Dawn of Sorrow lives.
