= Shin-Takasegawa Pumped Storage Station =

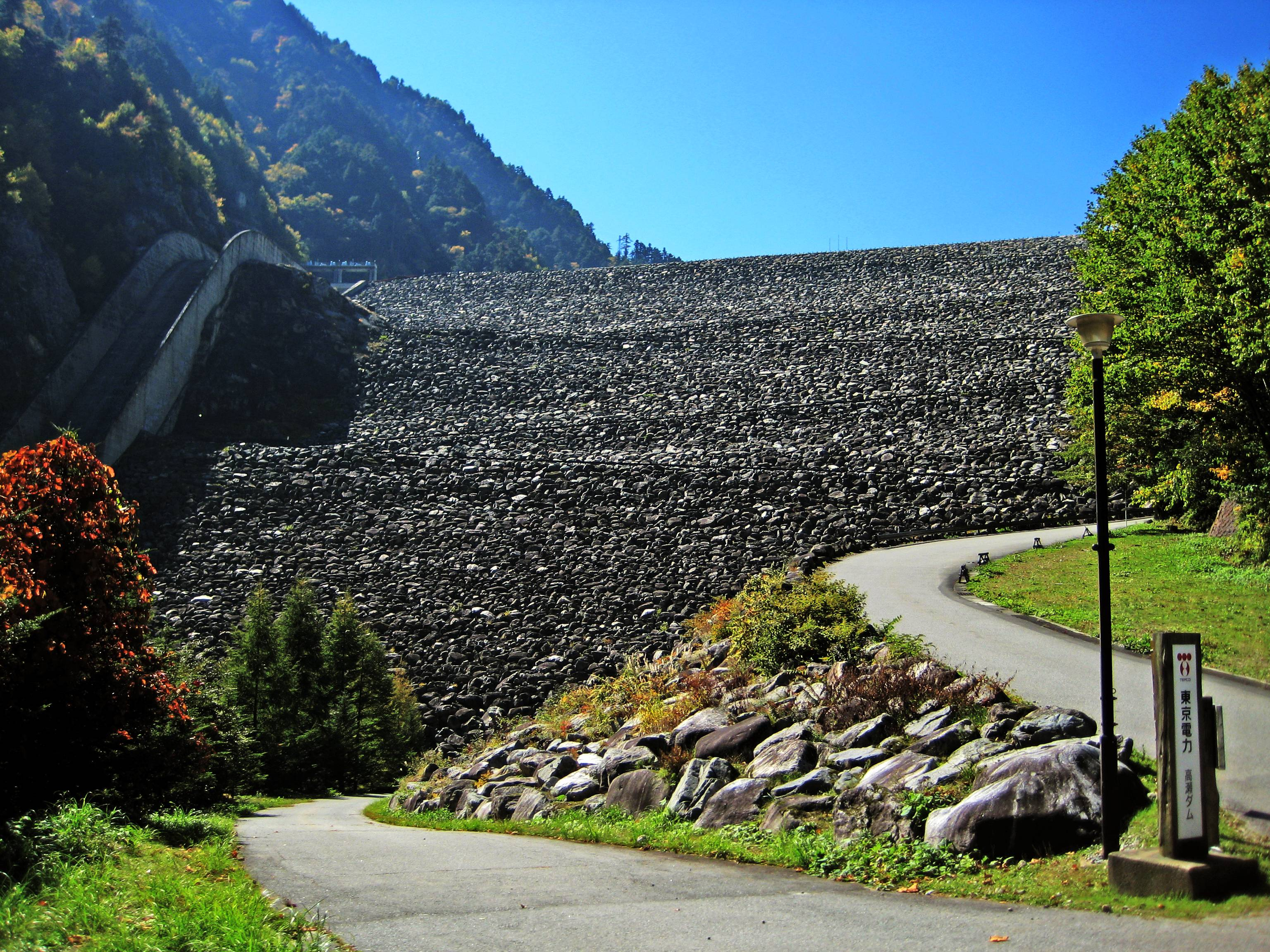
- The Takase Dam
- Interactive map of Shin-Takasegawa Pumped Storage Station
- Country: Japan
- Location: Ōmachi, Nagano Prefecture
- Coordinates: 36°28′26″N 137°41′23″E
- Status: Operational
- Construction began: 1971
- Opening date: 1980
- Owner: TEPCO

Upper reservoir
- Creates: Takase Reservoir
- Total capacity: 76,200,000 m^{3} (61,800 acre⋅ft)

Lower reservoir
- Creates: Nankura Reservoir
- Total capacity: 32,500,000 m^{3} (26,300 acre⋅ft)

Power Station
- Hydraulic head: 229 m (751 ft) (net)
- Turbines: 4 x 320 MW (430,000 hp) reversible Francis-type
- Installed capacity: 1,280 MW (1,720,000 hp)

The Shin-Takasegawa Pumped Storage Station (新高瀬川発電所) uses the Takase River (a tributary of the Shinano River) to operate a pumped storage hydroelectric scheme about 12 kilometres (7.5 mi) west of Ōmachi in Nagano Prefecture, Japan. Part of the system is within Chūbu-Sangaku National Park.

Construction on the complex began in 1971, concluded in 1978 and the power station was commissioned in 1980. The power plant has a 1,280 megawatts (1,720,000 hp) installed capacity and its upper reservoir is created by the Takase Dam, a rock-fill dam — which at 176 metres (577 ft) in height is the tallest of its type in Japan. It is also the second tallest dam in Japan, next to Kurobe Dam.

== Design and operation ==
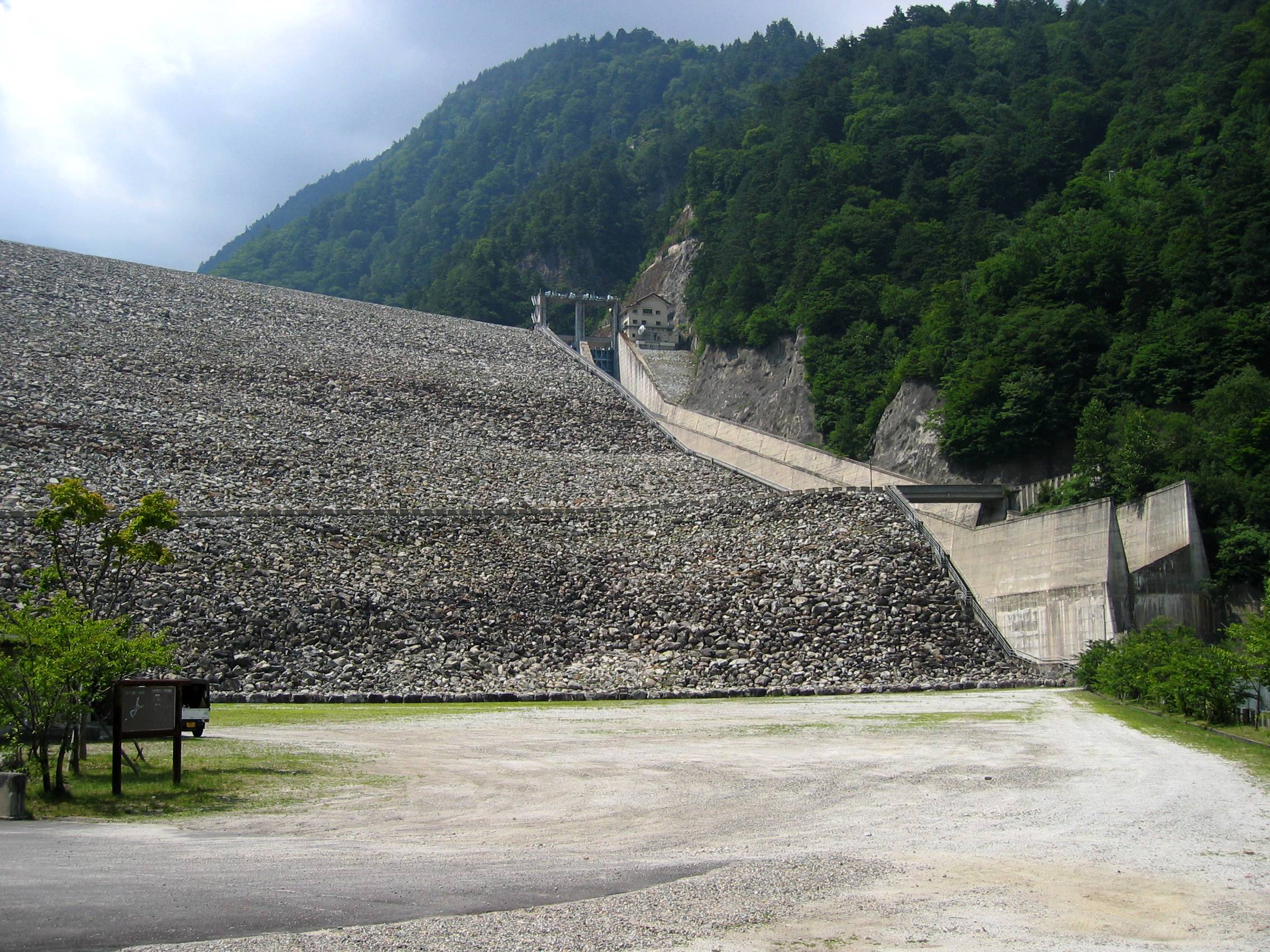
The Nanakura Dam which creates the lower reservoir

When energy demand is low and therefore electricity less expensive, the turbines reverse and pump water from the lower reservoir back into the upper reservoir. This process repeats depending upon energy demand and water availability. Water released from the lower reservoir is used to power the Nakanosawa Power Station which uses 140.8 metres (462 ft) of hydraulic head to power a single 42 megawatts (56,000 hp) Francis turbine generator. It was commissioned in May 1980.

=== Takase Dam ===
Creating the upper reservoir is the Takase Dam which is a 176-metre (577 ft) tall and 362-metre (1,188 ft) long rock-fill embankment dam with a structural volume of 11,586,000 cubic metres (15,154,000 cu yd). The Takase Reservoir has a 76,200,000 cubic metres (61,800 acre⋅ft) capacity of which only 16,200,000 cubic metres (13,100 acre⋅ft) is active (or "useful") for power generation. The low active capacity of the reservoir is due to the high levels of silt in the Takase River which cause the reservoir to reserve 79 percent of its capacity for this purpose. During operation, the upper reservoir only draws down 10 metres (33 ft).

During periods of high energy demand, water from the Takase Reservoir is released down to the power station. After received by the intake, water initially travels along two 8 metres (26 ft) diameter and 2,600 metres (8,500 ft) long head-race tunnels. At the terminus of these tunnels, they split into four 330 metres (1,080 ft) long penstocks which drop down a 200 metres (660 ft) deep shaft to the underground power station. At the power station, the water operates four 320 megawatts (430,000 hp) reversible Francis turbine-generators before being discharged into the lower reservoir, created by the Nanakura Dam.

=== Nanakura Dam ===
The Nanakura Dam is a 125-metre (410 ft) tall and 340-metre (1,120 ft) long rock-fill embankment dam with a structural volume of 7,380,000 cubic metres (9,650,000 cu yd). The reservoir created by the dam, the lower reservoir, has a 32,500,000 cubic metres (26,300 acre⋅ft) capacity of which 16,200,000 cubic metres (13,100 acre⋅ft) is active. To protect in against rapid draw-down in water levels (as much as 28 metres (92 ft)), the top of the dam is coated in hard rock materials.

== See also ==
- Ōmachi Dam - located downstream
- List of pumped-storage hydroelectric power stations
- List of tallest dams in the world
- Hida Mountains
- Chūbu-Sangaku National Park
