= Shinano-Kizaki Station =

Railway station in Ōmachi, Nagano Prefecture, Japan

Ōito Line21 Shinano-Kizaki Station 信濃木崎駅
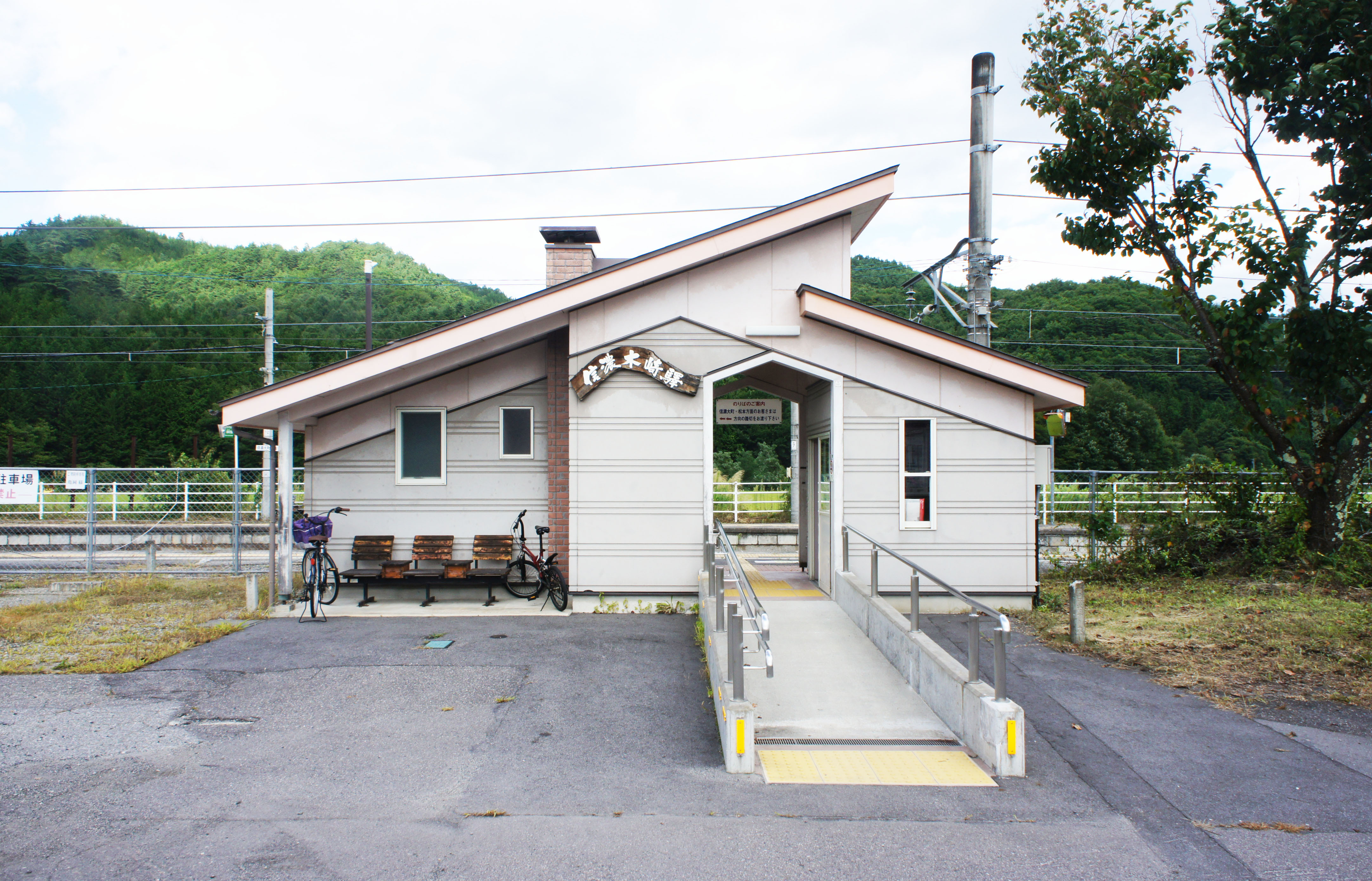
- Shinano-Kizaki Station, August 2021

General information
- Location: Taira-Kizaki, Ōmachi-shi, Nagano-ken 398-0001; Japan
- Coordinates: 36.5000032°N 137.8613645°E
- Elevation: 760.1 meters
- Operator: JR East
- Line: ■ Ōito Line
- Distance: 39.4 km from Matsumoto
- Platforms: 2 side platforms

Other information
- Status: Unstaffed
- Station code: 21
- Website: Official website

History
- Opened: 25 September 1929; 96 years ago

Services
Preceding station	JR East	Following station
Yanaba One-way operation	Ōito Line Rapid	Shinano-Ōmachi 23 Terminus
Inao 20 towards Minami-Otari	Ōito Line Local	Kita-Ōmachi 22 towards Matsumoto
Location
- Location within Nagano Prefecture Location within Japan

Shinano-Kizaki Station (信濃木崎駅, Shinano-Kizaki-eki) is a railway station in the city of Ōmachi, Nagano, Japan, operated by East Japan Railway Company (JR East).

== Lines ==
Shinano-Kizaki Station is served by the Ōito Line and is 39.4 kilometers from the terminus of the line at Matsumoto Station.

== Station layout ==
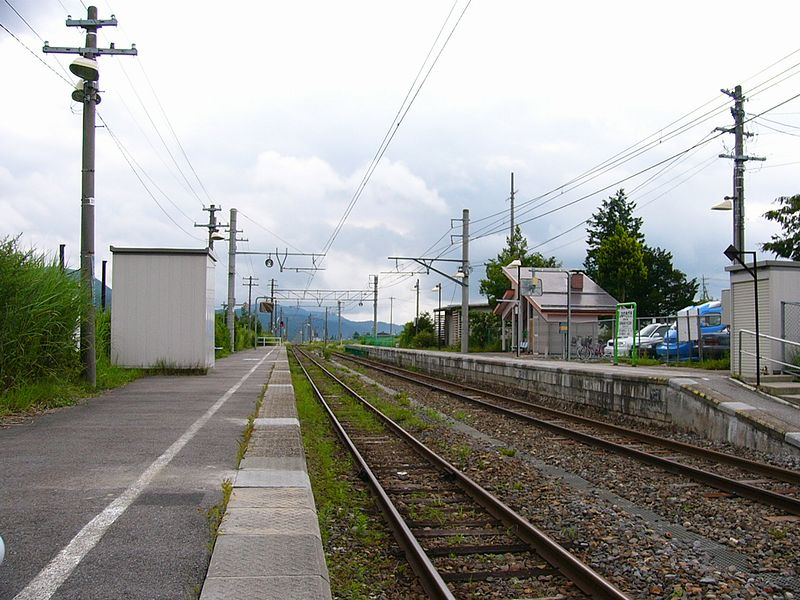
Shinano-Kizaki platform, July 2003

The station consists of two ground-level opposed side platforms connected by a level crossing. The station is unattended.

=== Platforms ===
1	■ Ōito Line	for Hakuba and Minami-Otari
2	■ Ōito Line	for Hotaka, Toyoshina and Matsumoto

== History ==
Shinano-Kizaki Station opened on 25 September 1929. With the privatization of Japanese National Railways (JNR) on 1 April 1987, the station came under the control of JR East. A new station building was completed on 28 December 1999.

== Surrounding area ==
- Lake Kizaki
- National Route 148

== See also ==
- List of railway stations in Japan
