= Ōmachi Dam =

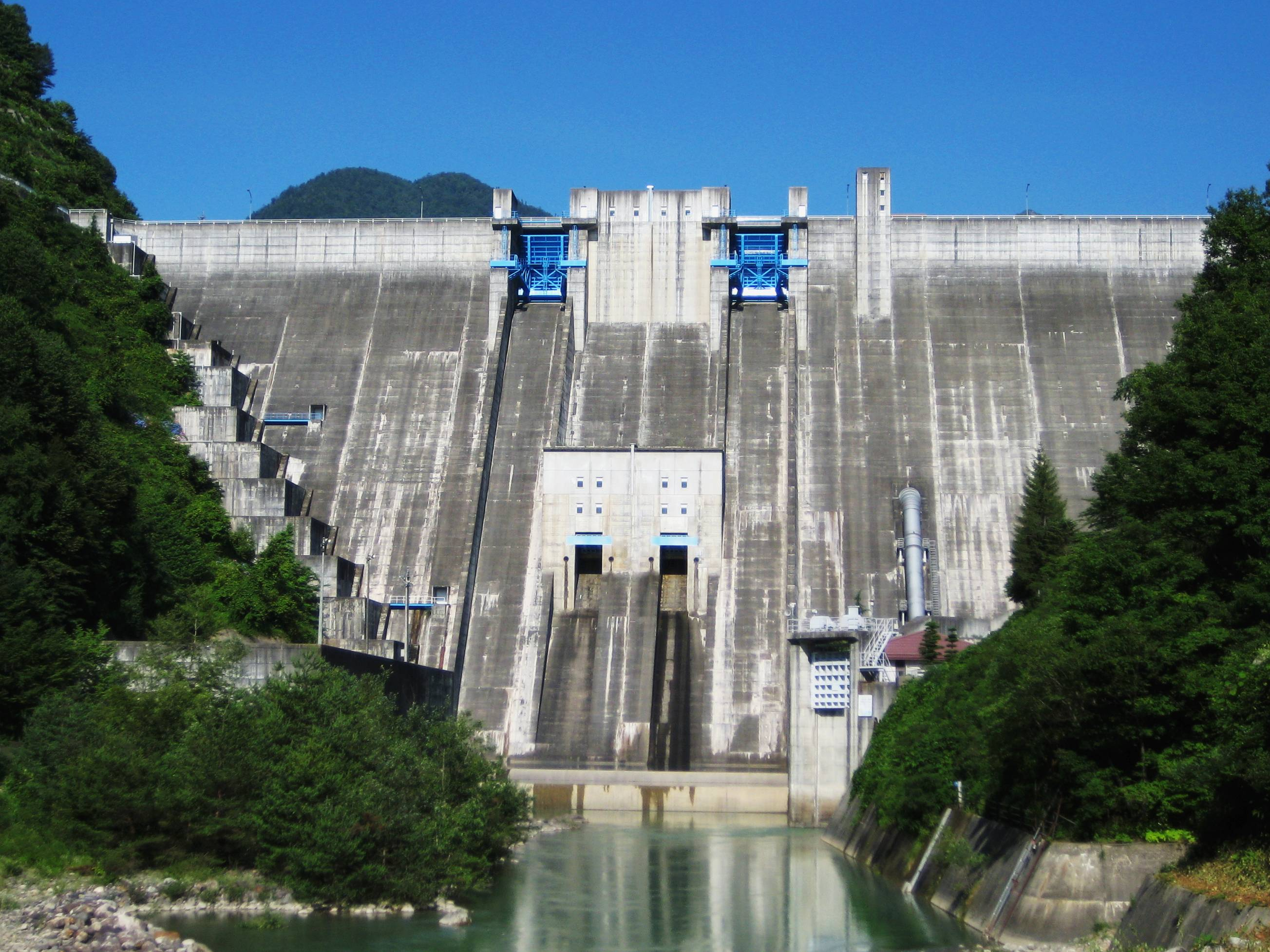

- Location within Japan
- Country: Japan
- Location: Ōmachi
- Coordinates: 36°30′53″N 137°46′53″E
- Status: Operational
- Construction began: 1972
- Opening date: 1985
- Owner: TEPCO

Dam and spillways
- Type of dam: Gravity
- Impounds: Takase River
- Height: 107 m (351 ft)
- Length: 338 m (1,109 ft)
- Dam volume: 766,000 m^{3} (1,001,890 cu yd)
- Spillways: 2
- Spillway type: 4 x radial gates
- Spillway capacity: 1,910 m^{3}/s (67,451 cu ft/s)

Reservoir
- Total capacity: 33,900,000 m^{3} (27,483 acre⋅ft)
- Active capacity: 28,900,000 m^{3} (23,430 acre⋅ft)
- Surface area: 110 ha (272 acres)
- Normal elevation: 898 m (2,946 ft)

Power Station
- Commission date: April 1985
- Hydraulic head: 63.4 m (208 ft)
- Turbines: 1 x 13 MW Francis-type
- Installed capacity: 13 MW

The Ōmachi Dam is a concrete gravity dam on the Takase River just west of Ōmachi in Nagano Prefecture, Japan. Construction of the dam began in 1975 and it was completed in 1985. The primary purpose of the dam is water supply and it also supports a 13 MW hydroelectric power station. It is owned by TEPCO.

== See also ==
- Shin-Takasegawa Pumped Storage Station - upstream
