= Lake Nakatsuna =

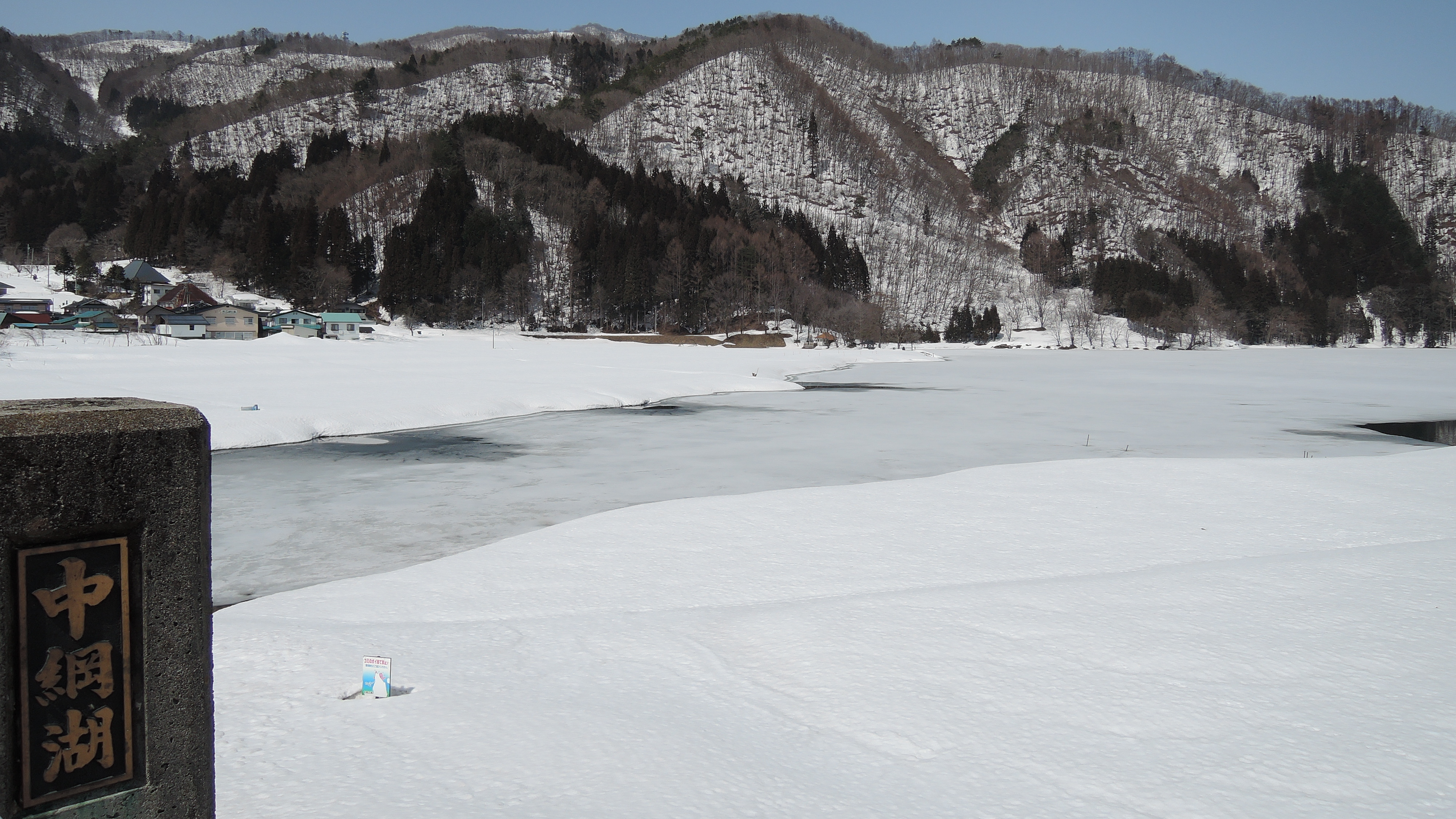
- Lake Nakatsuna in winter

- Location within Japan
- Location: Ōmachi, Nagano, Japan
- Coordinates: 36°30′N 137°51′E
- Lake type: Eutrophic lake
- Surface area: 12.5 hectares (31 acres)
- Max. depth: 12 metres (39 ft)
- Surface elevation: 820 m (2,690 ft)
- Settlements: Near Omachi, Nagano, Honshū, Japan

Lake Nakatsuna (中綱湖, Nakatsuna-ko) is a lake in Ōmachi Nagano Prefecture, Japan. It is one of the "Nishina Three Lakes" (Lake Aoki, Lake Nakatsuna and Lake Kizaki). Its sediments have been studied in an effort to better understand climate change in Japan, finding evidence of the Medieval Warm Period and Little Ice Age.
