= Kitaazumi District, Nagano =

District in Nagano prefecture, Japan

Coordinates: 36.778°N 137.871°E

Kitaazumi (北安曇郡, Kitaazumi-gun) is a district located in Nagano Prefecture, Japan.

As of 2023, the district has an estimated population of 29,918 with a density of 54.9 persons per km^{2}. The total area is 544.5 km^{2}.

== Municipalities ==
The district consists of one town and three villages:

- Hakuba (Note: Classified as a village.)
- Ikeda (Note: Classified as a town.)
- Matsukawa
- Otari

== History ==
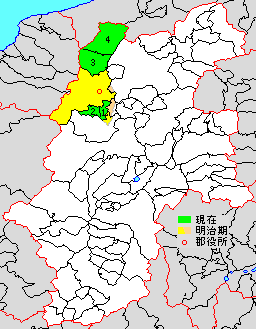
Map showing original extent of Kitaazumi District in Nagano Prefecture: * yellow - areas formerly within the district borders during the early Meiji period: 1. Ikeda-machi; 2. Matsukawa-mura; 3. Hakuba-mura; 4. Otari-mura

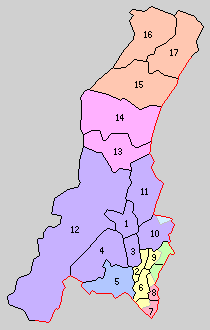
Colored areas are in this district.

=== District timeline ===
- 1878 - Founded after Azumi District was split into Minamiazumi and Kitaazumi Districts.
