= Japan National Route 148 =

National highway in Japan

National Route 148
- 国道148号
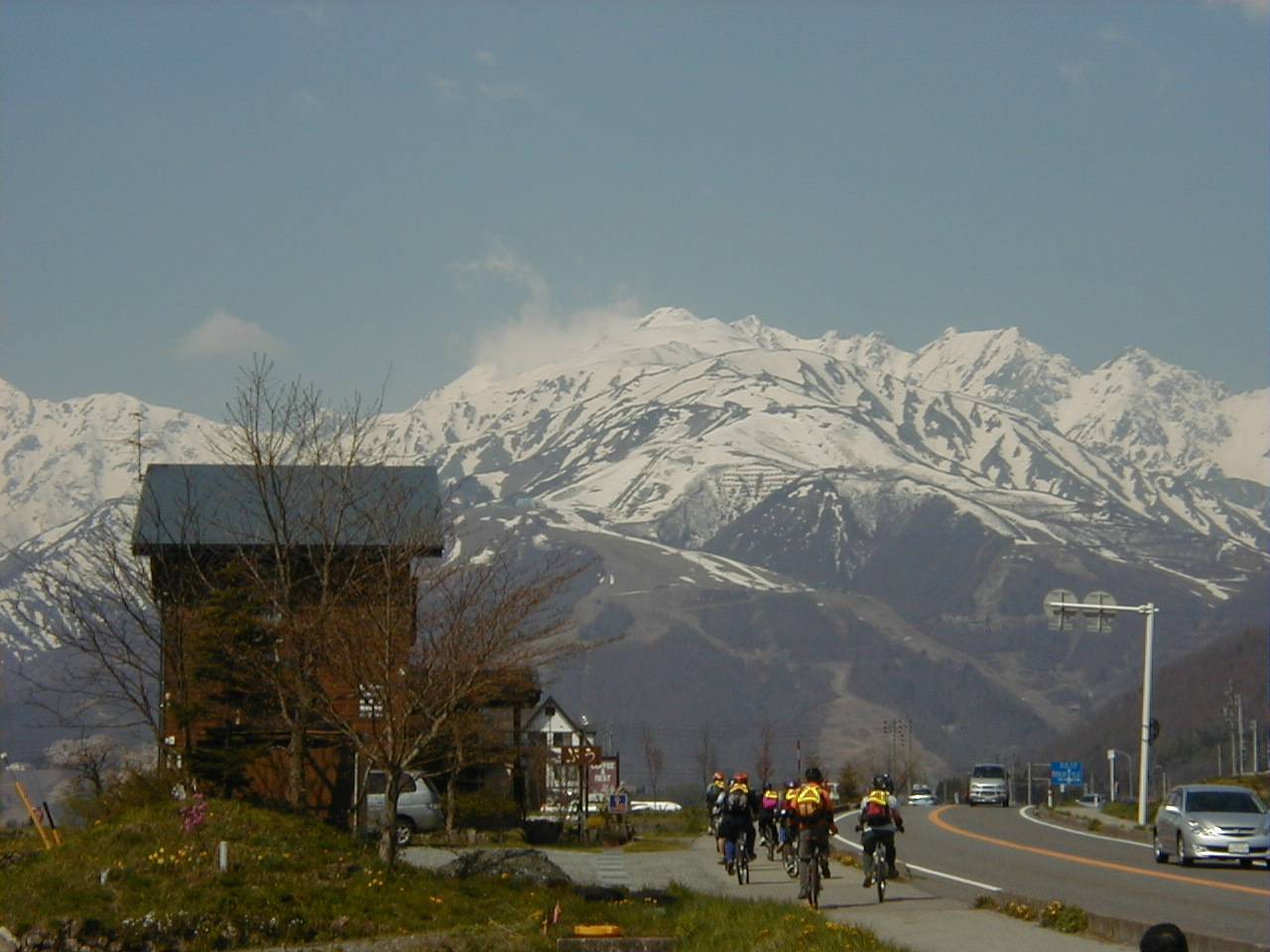

Route information
- Length: 69.9 km (43.4 mi)
- Existed: 1953–present

Major junctions
- North end: National Route 8 in Itoigawa, Niigata
- South end: National Route 147 in Ōmachi, Nagano

Location
- Country: Japan

Highway system
- National highways of Japan; Expressways of Japan
← National Route 147	→ National Route 149

National Route 148 is a national highway of Japan connecting Ōmachi, Nagano and Itoigawa, Niigata in Japan, with a total length of 69.9 km (43.43 mi).
