= Hokkoku Kaidō =

Edo period highway in Japan

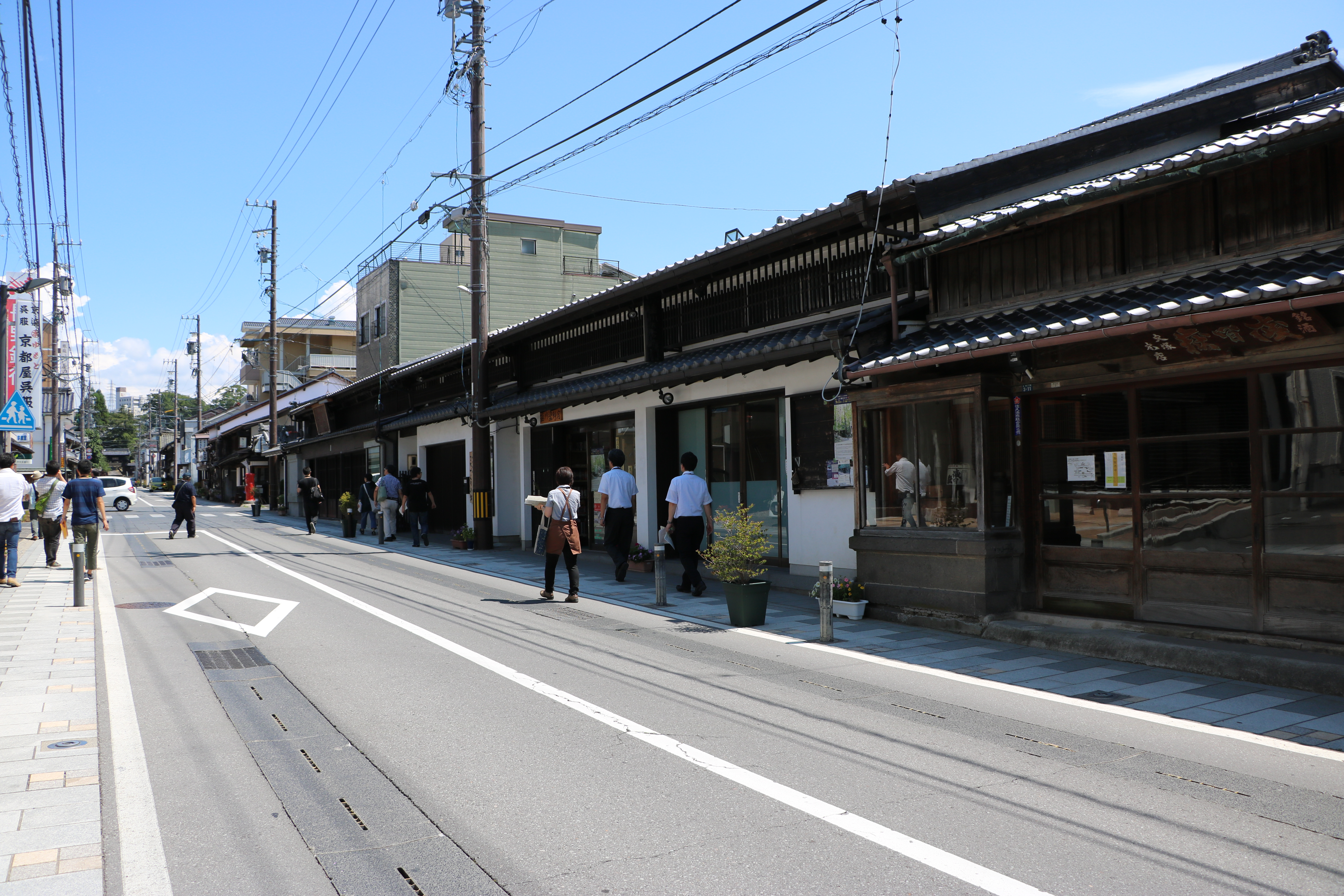
Komoro, Nagano Prefecture

Map

The Hokkoku Kaidō (北国街道, Hokkoku Kaidō) was a highway in Japan during the Edo period. It was a secondary route, ranked below the Edo Five Routes in importance. Because it was developed for travelers going to Zenkō-ji, it was also called Zenkō-ji Kaidō (善光寺街道). It stretched from the Nakasendō's Oiwake-juku to the Hokurikudō's Takada-shuku. Nowadays, the route is traced by Route 18, stretching between the town of Karuizawa and the city of Jōetsu.

Although it ranked below the five major routes, the Hokkoku Kaidō was an important link between the Kantō region and the Sea of Japan side of Honshu. It carried marine products and gold from the mines on Sado. The daimyō (regional ruler) from the Hokuriku region travelled it on their sankin kōtai journeys between their domains and Edo.

== Stations of the Hokkoku Kaidō ==
Though there were 25 post stations along the Hokkoku Kaidō, some of the stations were paired stations (合宿, aijuku). Additionally, Nezumi-shuku and Shinonoi Oiwake-shuku were mid stations (ai no shuku (間宿), at which stayovers were not permitted, reducing the number where travellers could stay to 17. The stations are divided by present-day prefectures below, with the municipality in parentheses.

=== Nagano Prefecture ===
Starting Location: Oiwake-juku (追分宿) (Karuizawa, Kitasaku District)
1. Komoro-shuku (小諸宿) (Komoro)
2. Tanaka-juku (田中宿) and Unno-juku (海野宿) (Tōmi)
3. Ueda-shuku (上田宿) (Ueda)
- Nezumi-shuku (鼠宿) (Sakaki, Hanashina District)
4. Sakaki-shuku (坂木宿) (Sakaki, Hanishina District)
5. Kami Kurashina-shuku (上戸倉宿) and Shimo Kurashina-juku (下戸倉宿) (Chikuma)
6. Yashiro-shuku (屋代宿) (Chikuma)
- Shinonoi Oiwake-shuku (篠ノ井追分宿) (Nagano)
7. Tanbajima-shuku (丹波島宿) (Nagano)
8. Zenkōji-shuku (善光寺宿) (Nagano)
9. Shinmachi-shuku (新町宿) (Nagano)
10. Mure-juku (牟礼宿) (Iizuna, Kamiminochi District)
11. Furuma-shuku (古間宿) and Kashiwabara-juku (柏原宿) (Shinano, Kamiminochi District)
12. Nojiri-shuku (野尻宿) (Shinano, Kamiminochi District)

=== Niigata Prefecture ===
13. Sekigawa-shuku (関川宿) and Uehara-juku (上原宿) (Myōkō)
14. Tagiri-shuku (田切宿) and Futamata-juku (二俣宿) (Myōkō)
15. Sekiyama-shuku (関山宿) (Myōkō)
16. Matsuzaki-shuku (松崎宿) and Nippongi-juku (二本木宿) (Nakagō-ku, Jōetsu)
17. Arai-shuku (荒井宿) (Myōkō)
Ending Location: Takada-shuku (高田宿) (Jōetsu)

Street lantern at the start of the Hokkoku Kaidō, Nagahama

== See also ==
- Edo Five Routes
  - Tōkaidō (or 53 Stations of the Tōkaidō)
  - Nakasendō (or 69 Stations of the Nakasendō)
  - Kōshū Kaidō
  - Ōshū Kaidō
  - Nikkō Kaidō
- Other Routes
  - Kisoji
  - Mikuni Kaidō
