= Satsuma Kaidō =

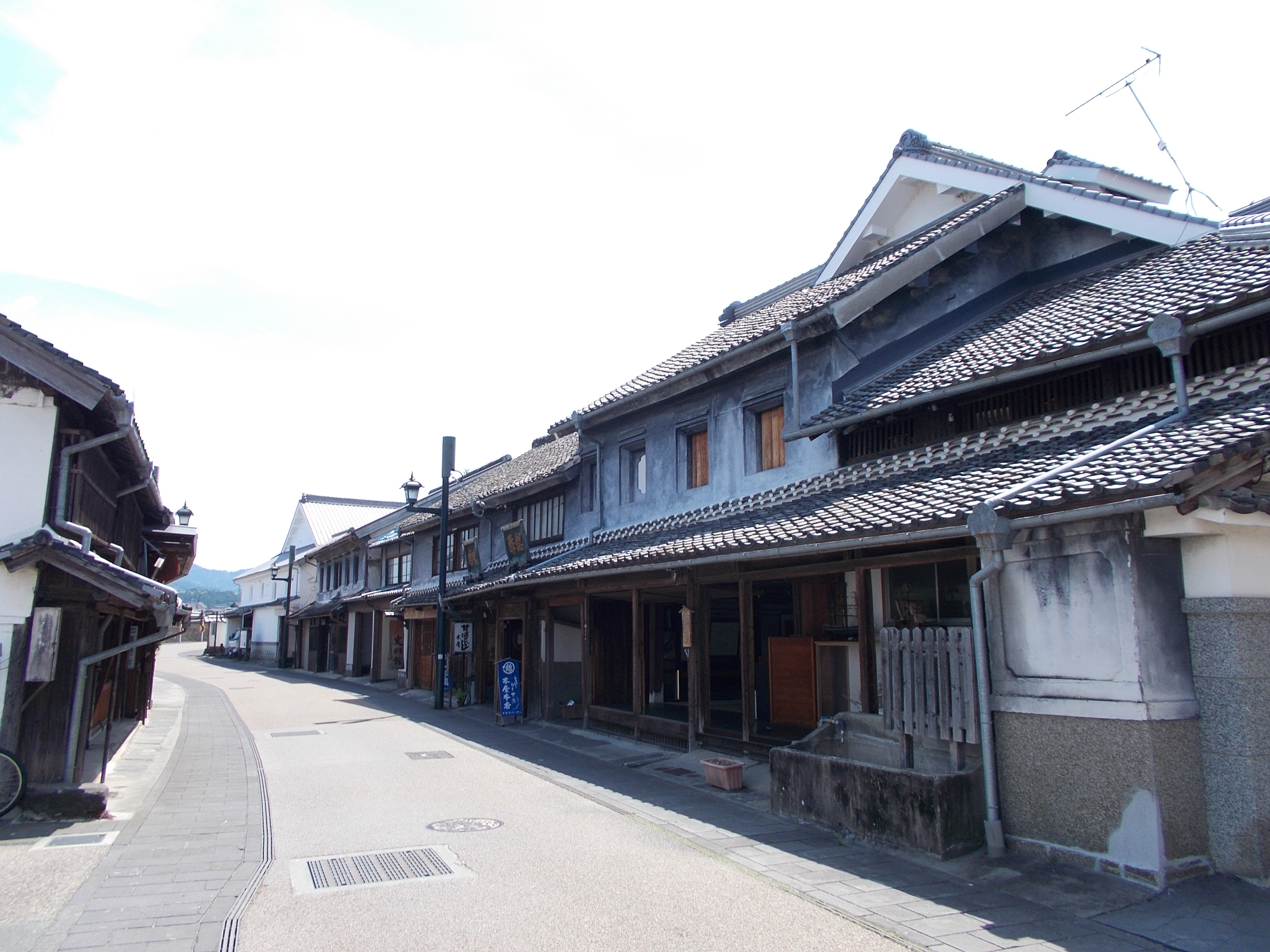
Yamaga-shuku in Yamaga

The Satsuma Kaidō (薩摩街道) was a road across Kyūshū from Chikushino to Kagoshima, used by daimyōs for the sankin-kōtai, and also by the lord of the Satsuma han on whom a similar obligation of visiting the shōgun was imposed.

The Satsuma Kaidō's route is followed closely by the modern Route 3.

== Subroutes ==
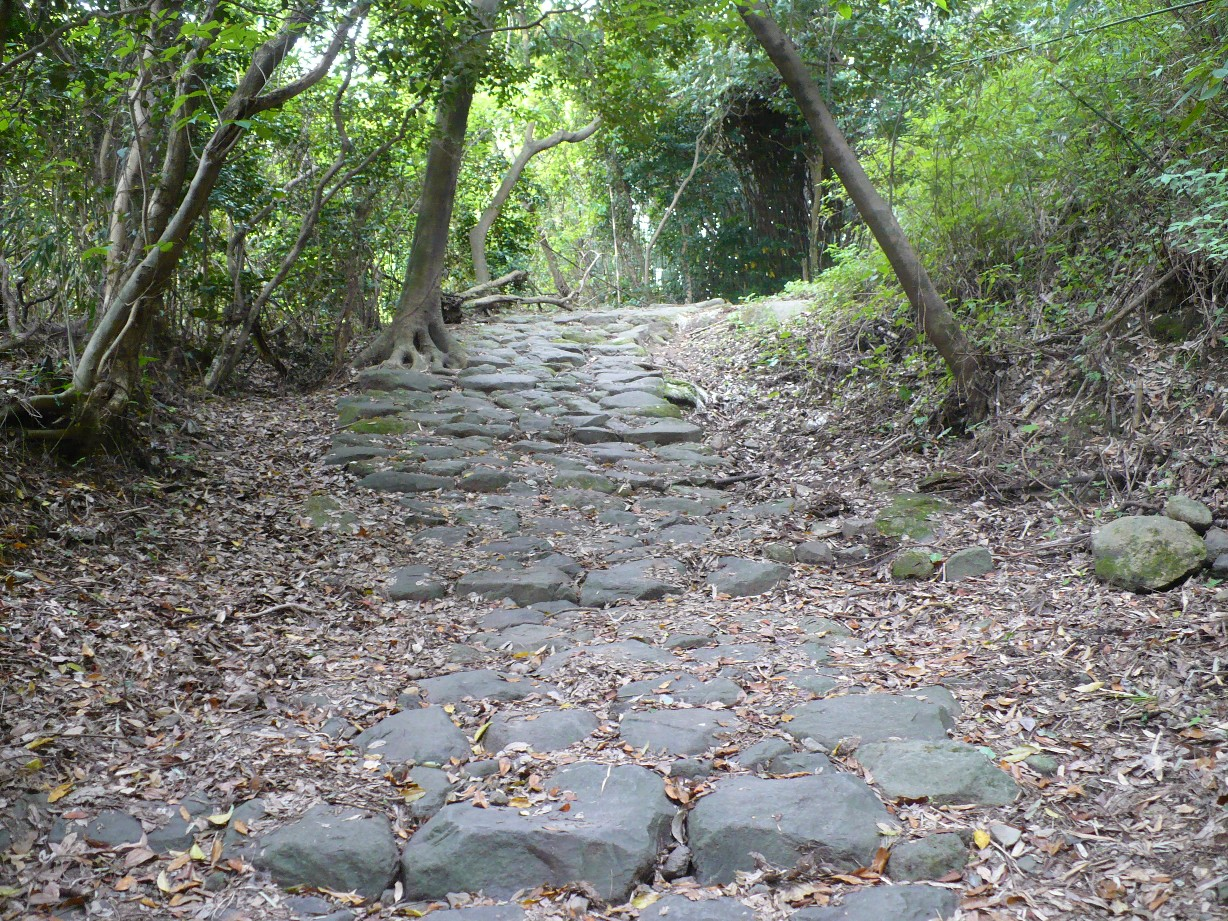
Ōkuchisuji near Kajiki

In addition to the established use of traveling from Edo (modern-day Tokyo) to Satsuma Province, there were also many roads that connected from the Satsuma Kaidō. One such sub-route was the Ōkuchisuji (大口筋), which connected Satsuma Province with Ōkuchi. The terminus for the Ōkuchisuji is in Ōkuchi in modern Isa. Another sub-route was the Takaokasuji (高岡筋) connected Kajiki (modern-day Aira) with the Sadowara Castle in Sadowara (modern-day Miyazaki), Miyazaki Prefecture. Part of its route can be traced with Japan's Route 10.

== Stations of the Satsuma Kaidō ==
The Satsuma Kaidō's 23 post stations are listed below with their modern-day municipalities indicated beside them.

=== Fukuoka Prefecture ===
Starting Location: Yamae-shuku (山家宿) (Chikushino) (also part of the Nagasaki Kaidō)
1. Matsuzaki-shuku (松崎宿) (Ogōri)
2. Fuchu-shuku (府中宿) (Kurume)
3. Hainuzuka-shuku (羽犬塚宿) (Chikugo)
4. Setaka-shuku (瀬高宿) (Miyama)
5. Haramachi-shuku (原町宿) (Miyama)

=== Kumamoto Prefecture ===
6. Nankan-shuku (南関宿) (Nankan, Tamana District)
7. Yamaga-shuku (山鹿宿) (Yamaga)
8. Mitorishinmachi-shuku (味取新町宿) (Kumamoto)
9. Kumamoto-shuku (熊本宿) (Kumamoto)
10. Kawashiri-shuku (河尻宿) (Kumamoto)
11. Uto-shuku (宇土宿) (Uto)
12. Ogawa-shuku (小川宿) (Uki)
13. Yatsushiro-shuku (八代宿) (Yatsushiro)
14. Hinagu-shuku (日奈久宿) (Yatsushiro)
15. Sashiki-shuku (佐敷宿) (Ashikita, Ashikita District)
16. Chinmachi-shuku (陳町宿) (Minamata)

=== Kagoshima Prefecture ===
17. Izumi-shuku (出水宿) (Izumi)
18. Akune-shuku (阿久根宿) (Akune)
19. Mukōda-shuku (向田宿) (Satsumasendai)
20. Kushikino-shuku (串木野宿) (Ichikikushikino)
21. Ichiki-shuku (市来宿) (Ichikikushikino)
22. Ijūin-shuku (伊集院宿) (Hioki)
23. Kagoshima-shuku (鹿児島宿) (Kagoshima)
Ending Location: Kagoshima Castle (Kagoshima)

== See also ==
- Kaidō
- Edo Five Routes
