= Bungo Kaidō =

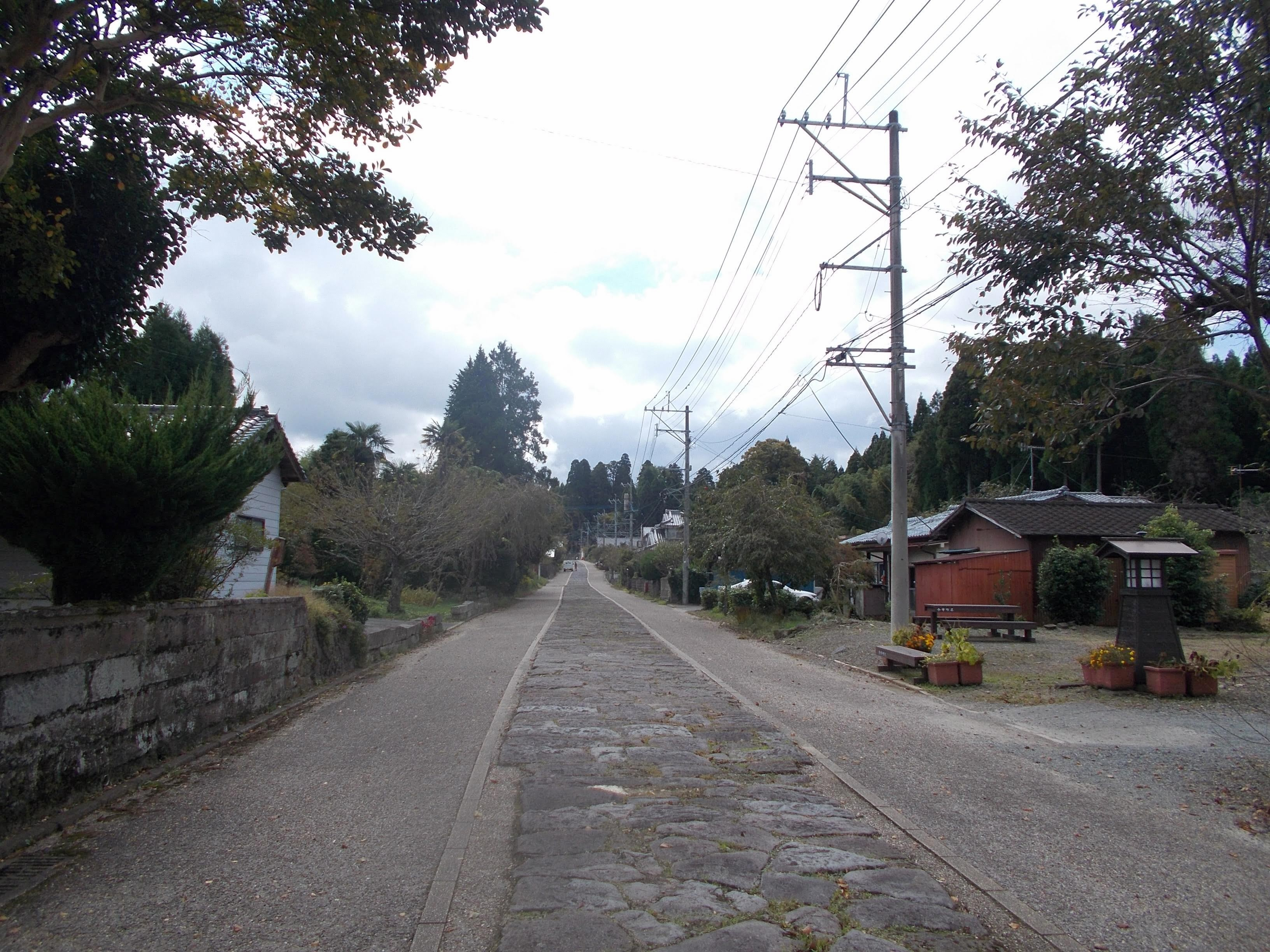
The Bungo Kaidō running through Imaichi-shuku

The Bungo Kaidō (豊後街道) was a route built during the Edo period in Japan. It started in Kumamoto, Higo Province (modern-day Kumamoto Prefecture), and stretched to Ōita, Bungo Province (modern-day Ōita Prefecture). There were six post stations along the route connecting the two cities.

The historical route is now traced by National Routes 57 and 442, as well as Kumamoto's Prefectural Routes 110, 337 and 339.

== History ==
The Bungo Kaidō was established in 1601 by Katō Kiyomasa, and was an important link between the castle town of Kumamoto and the Tsurusaki area of Bungo Province in the modern-day Ōita Prefecture. After Toyotomi Hideyoshi unified the nation and Kiyomasa entered Higo to rule the province, Katō traveled the route to the port of Tsurusaki. Then he reached Osaka through the Seto Inland Sea and headed to Edo by foot. Early in the Edo period, travel along the road mostly consisted of Kumamoto Domain heading towards Edo in order to take part in sankin-kōtai.

== Stations of the Bungo Kaidō ==
The Bungo Kaidō's 6 post stations, as listed in 1705, are listed below with their modern-day municipalities indicated beside them. On the Bungo Province side of the route, it was called the Higo Kaidō, but on the Higo Province side, it was called Bungo Kaidō.

=== Kumamoto Prefecture ===
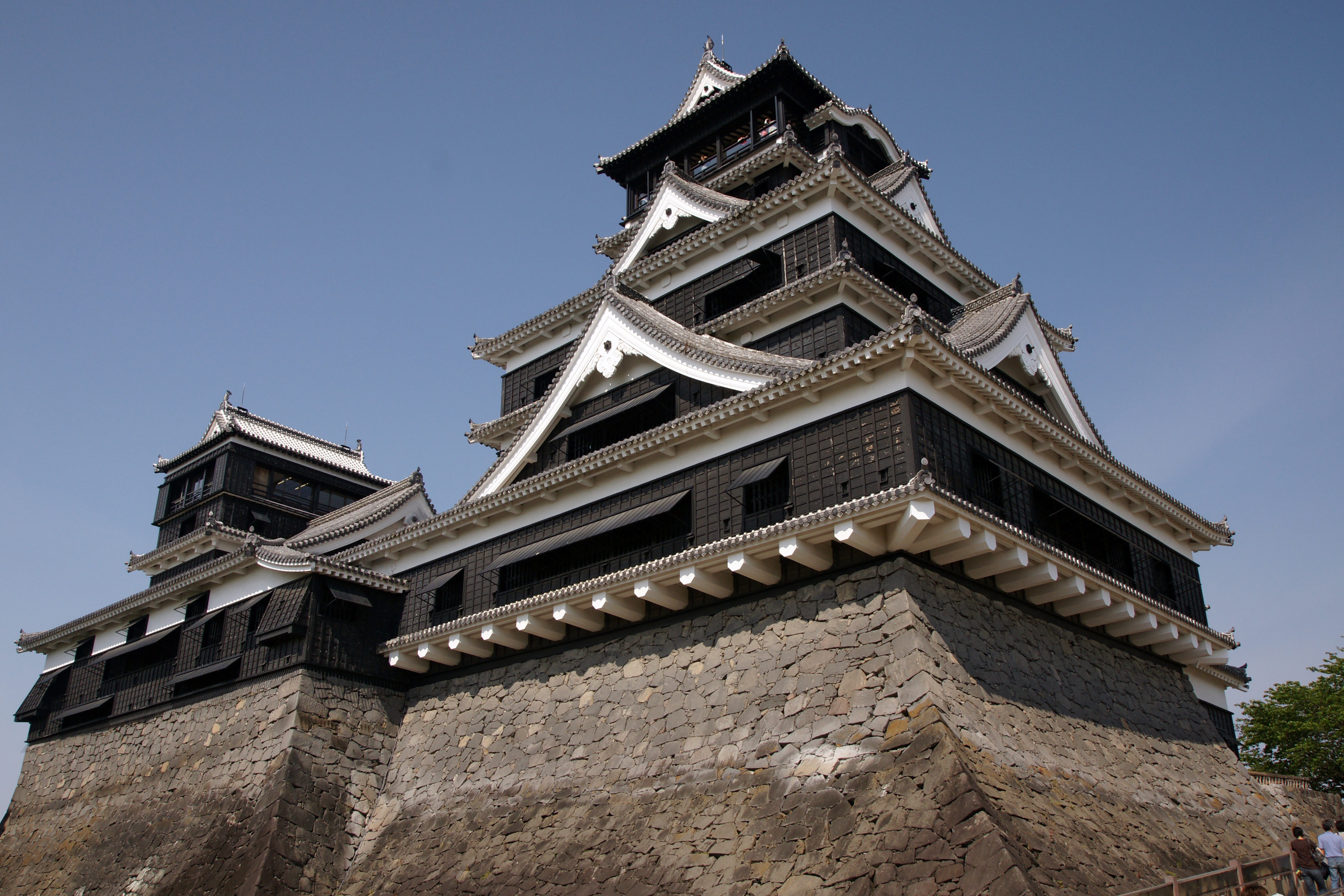
Kumamoto Castle

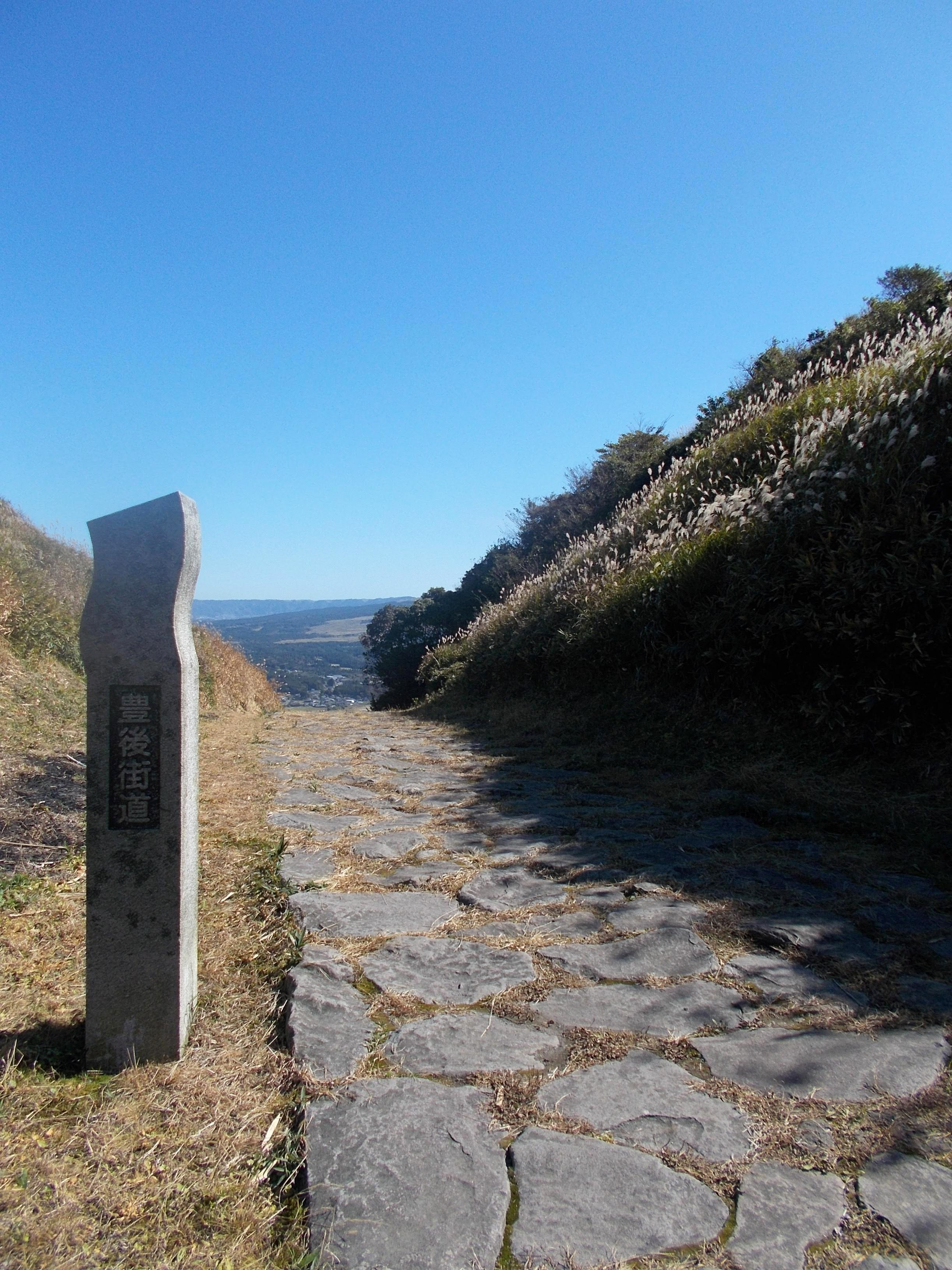
Bungo Kaidō near Futae Pass, Aso

Starting Location: Kumamoto Castle (熊本城) (Kumamoto)
1. Ōzu-shuku (大津宿) (Ōzu, Kikuchi District)
2. Uchinomaki-shuku (内牧宿) (Aso)
3. Sakanashi-shuku (坂梨宿) (Aso)

=== Ōita Prefecture ===
4. Kujū-shuku (久住宿) (Taketa)
5. Imaichi-shuku (今市宿) (Ōita)
6. Notsuharu-shuku (野津原宿) (Ōita)
Ending Location: Port of Tsurusaki (鶴崎港) (Ōita)

== Subroutes ==
In addition to the established use of traveling from Edo (modern-day Tokyo) to Higo Province, there were also many roads that connected from the Bungo Kaidō. One such sub-route was the Hyūga Ōkan (日向往還), which connected Hyūga Province with Kumamoto. The terminus for the Hyūga Ōkan is in Nobeoka in modern Miyazaki Prefecture.

== See also ==
- Kaidō
- Edo Five Routes
- History of Kumamoto Prefecture
