= Nikkō Wakiōkan =

Nikkō Wakiōkan (日光脇往還) was established during the Edo period as a subroute to connect Hachiōji with Nikkō. The route stretches approximately 160 km (99 mi) and, at various points, is called the Nikkōdō. Because it is an alternate route to the Nikkō Kaidō, other names are Nikkō Wakikaidō, Nikkō Hinoban Kaidō, Sennindōshin Kaidō, Hachiōji Kaidō and Tatebayashidō.

== Stations of the Nikkō Wakiōkan ==
The 22 post stations of the Nikkō Wakiōkan, with their present-day municipalities listed beside them. The route runs simultaneously with the Nikkō Reiheishi Kaidō starting at Sano-juku and with the Mibudōri (壬生通り) starting at Niregi-juku.

=== Tokyo ===
1. Haijima-juku (拝島宿) (Akishima)
2. Hakonegasaki-juku (箱根ヶ崎宿) (Mizuho, Nishitama District)

=== Saitama Prefecture ===
3. Nihongi-juku (二本木宿) (Iruma)
4. Ōgimachiya-juku (扇町屋宿) (Iruma)
5. Kurosu-juku (黒須宿) (Iruma)
6. Takahagi-juku (高萩宿) (Hidaka)
7. Sakado-juku (坂戸宿) (Sakado)
8. Takasaka-juku (高坂宿) (Higashimatsuyama)
9. Matsuyama-juku (松山宿) (Higashimatsuyama)
10. Fukiage-shuku (吹上宿) (Kōnosu)
11. Oshi-juku (忍宿) (Gyōda)

=== Gunma Prefecture ===
12. Kawamata-juku (川俣宿) (Meiwa, Ōra District)
13. Tatebayashi-juku (館林宿) (Tatebayashi)

=== Tochigi Prefecture ===
14. Sano-juku (佐野宿) (Sano)
15. Tomida-juku (富田宿) (Tochigi)
16. Tochigi-juku (栃木宿) (Tochigi)
17. Kassenba-juku (合戦場宿) (Tochigi)
18. Kanasaki-juku (金崎宿) (Tochigi)
19. Niregi-juku (楡木宿) (Kanuma)
20. Kanuma-juku (鹿沼宿) (Kanuma)
21. Fubasami-juku (文挟宿) (Nikkō)
22. Imaichi-juku (今市宿) (Nikkō)

== See also ==
- Kaidō
- Edo Five Routes
