= Sukegō =

Sukegō (助郷, assisting villages) was a system of overland transport corvée labour taxation established by the Tokugawa shogunate as part of the development of the five national routes known as the Gokaidō. Roads were widened, distance markers between shukueki (宿駅, post stations) were erected, and stations without official status were forced to cease operations. As a system the Gokaido provided rest stops, centres of transportation, and most importantly porters and post horses for government officials and goods. These post stations were supported by designated villages, referred to as sukegō.

== History ==
In the late 1630s or early 1640s, post stations were ordered to increase the transport workforce. Although the stations were required to maintain a minimum number of porters and horses, many did not and struggled to find sufficient labour. In 1694, the bakufu instituted the sukegō system to requisition peasants and horses from villages near post stations, although the processes had been occurring long before the implementation of the formal system; the term sukeuma (助馬, assisting horses) was used in the bakufu decree from 1637. It is debated as to whether the sukegō system began then in 1637 or 1694, but knowledge about transport corvée labour prior to 1694 is limited.

In 1694, the bakufu initiated a major reform of the corvée system for transport both through Tokugawa lands and private lands belonging to daimyo and lower nobles; this was the first time the term sukegō was used. This reform tabulated the post station's name, the names of all the villages assigned to it under the sukegō system, the names of each village's headman, and the villages' estimated yield, based on the 1689 census. The general rate was two porters and two horses per every 100 koku. The initial reform applied to the Tōkaidō, Nakasendō, and Minoji; it was extended to the Nikkō Kaidō in 1696 and Kiso Kaidō (technically a stretch of the Nakasendō from Niekawa-juku to Magome-juku) in 1712.

The 1694 reform allowed the authority of the shogunate to supersede that of the local authorities, i.e. the private overlords (地頭).

== Effects ==
Each post station was assigned a designated number of assisting villages in a roughyl 18 square kilometer area around the station. Assisting villages were further divided into jōsukegō (定助郷, regular assisting villages) or ōsukegō (大助郷, auxiliary assisting villages). The ōsukegō were farther from the post stations and were intended to be only called upon for corvée labour if the regular assissting villages were unable to meet the demand. However, it soon became apparent that the labour from regular assisting villages was insufficient for the growing demand. As a result, in 1725, the divided classification was collapsed into a single designation of jōsukegō and all villages were taxed by the same standard.

=== Economic consequences ===
The sukegō system significantly diverted peasants from farm work, often to the detriment of farm practices. The initial obligations of 1694 (2 labourers per 100 koku) increased by 1725 to 50 labourers per 100 koku, and by 1785 it had allegedly reached the point of 300 to 400 labourers per 100 koku. These labourers were "on call" on a rotating schedule, rather than permanently employed. Many of the labourers were itinerant employees, and had to be paid for and fed by the sukegō.

=== Discontent and resistance ===
The growing abuse of the sukegō system by both the shogunate itself and the post stations drove many villages to protest, both passively and violently.

One form of passive resistance among peasants was mabiki (間引き), a word that literally meant "thinning", but was used as a metaphor, based on the techniques for rice planting, for infanticide. Another was the movement of peasants to cities during famine years, which local authorities tried, largely in vain, to prevent.

The Tenma Uprising of 1764 saw over 200,000 villagers from provinces surrounding Edo to march on the capital in protest over higher taxes on post stations along the Nakasendō. It was the largest outpouring of peasant protest during the 265 years of the Tokugawa shogunate.
