= Mito Kaidō =

Mito Kaidō (水戸街道) was an old road, kaidō, in Japan starting from the center of Edobashi (today’s Nihonbashi). It was built to connect Edo with Mito in modern-day Ibaraki Prefecture. Travelers from Edo called it the Mito Kaidō, but travelers from Mito called it the Edo Kaidō. Today, National Route 6 follows the old Mito Kaido.

== Stations of the Mito Kaidō ==
The post stations of the Mito Kaidō, with their present-day municipalities listed beside them.

=== Tokyo ===
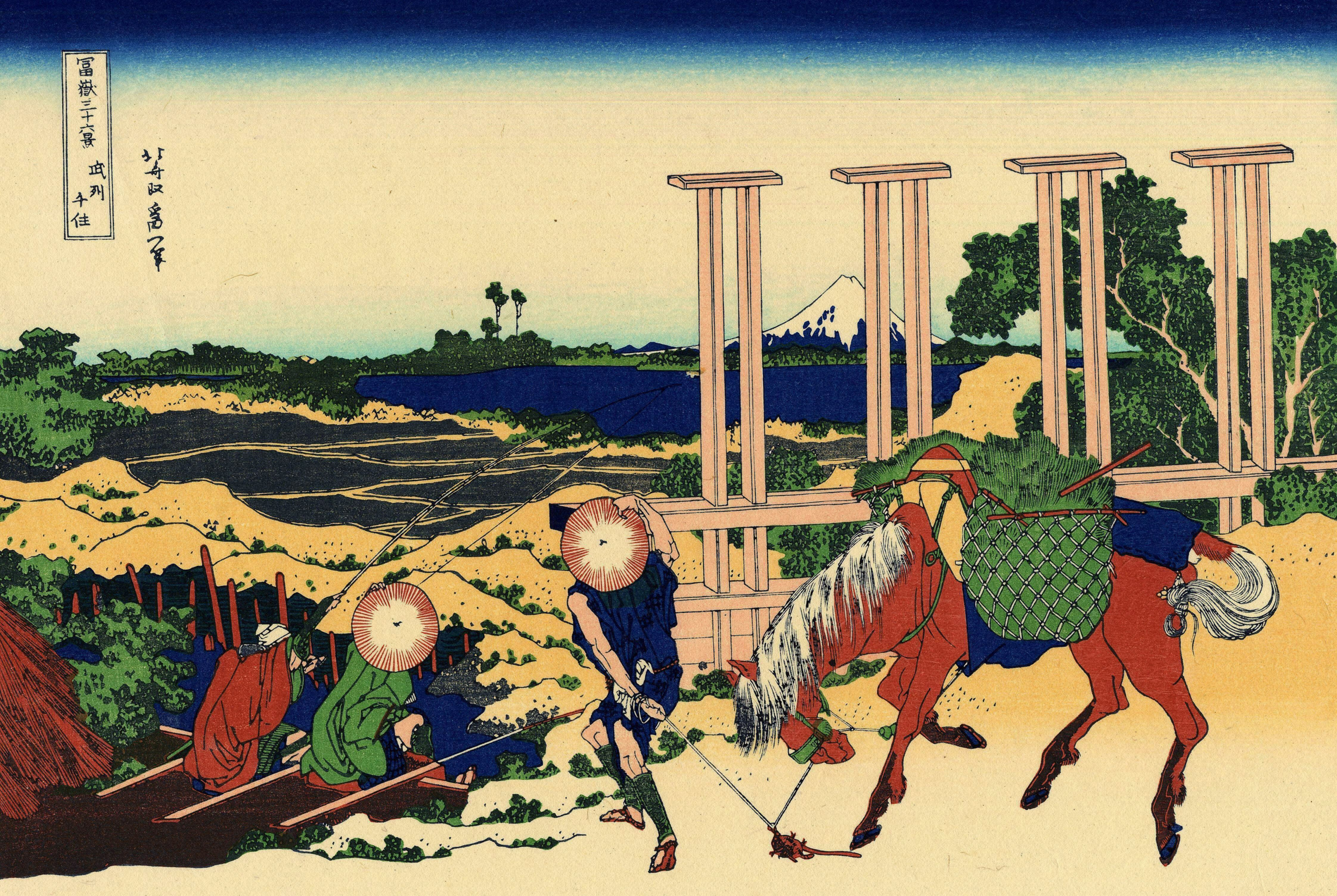
Hokusai's ukiyo-e of Senjujuku in the early 19th century

1. Senjujuku (千住宿) (Adachi) (also part of the Nikkō Kaidō)
2. Niijuku (新宿) (Kanamachi, Katsushika)

=== Chiba Prefecture ===
3. Matsudojuku (松戸宿) (Matsudo)
4. Koganejuku (小金宿) (Matsudo)
5. Abikojuku (我孫子宿) (Abiko)

=== Ibaraki Prefecture ===
6. Toridejuku (取手宿) (Toride)
7. Fujishirojuku (藤代宿) (Toride)
8. Wakashibajuku (若柴宿) (Ryūgasaki)
9. Ushikujuku (牛久宿) (Ushiku)
10. Arakawaokijuku (荒川沖宿) (Tsuchiura)
11. Nakamurajuku (中村宿) (Tsuchiura)
12. Tsuchiurajuku (土浦宿) (Tsuchiura)
13. Nakanukijuku (中貫宿) (Tsuchiura)
14. Inayoshijuku (稲吉宿) (Kasumigaura)
15. Fuchūjuku (府中宿) (Ishioka)
16. Takeharajuku (竹原宿) (Omitama)
17. Katakurajuku (片倉宿) (Omitama)
18. Obatajuku (小幡宿) (Ibaraki, Higashiibaraki District)
19. Nagaokajuku (長岡宿) (Ibaraki, Higashiibaraki District)
20. Mitojuku (水戸宿) (Mito)

== See also ==
- Kaidō
- Edo Five Routes (Gokaido)
