= Edo Five Routes =

Five centrally administered routes connecting Kyoto to Edo, Japan

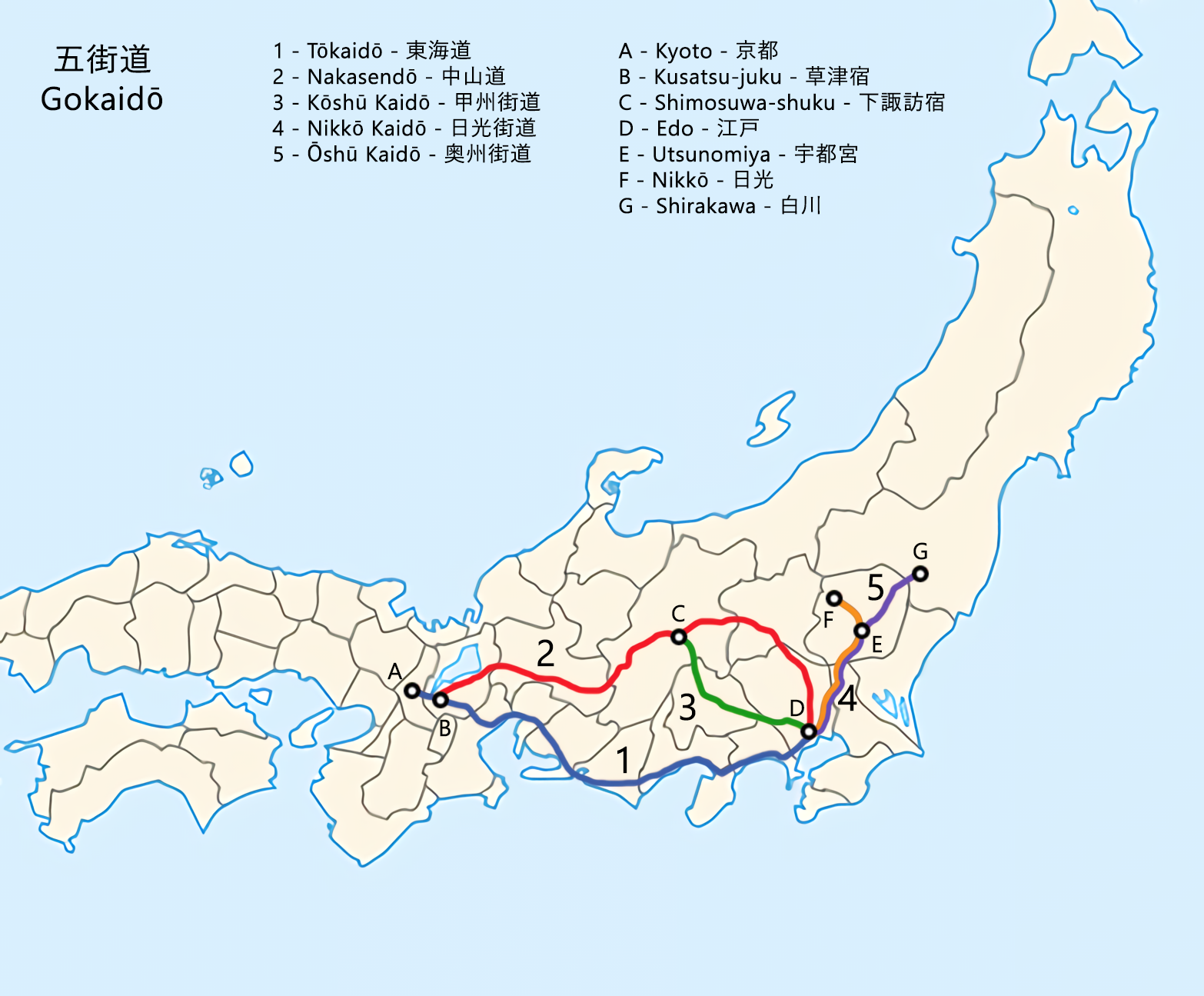
The Gokaidō

The Five Routes (五街道, Gokaidō), sometimes translated as "Five Highways", were the five centrally administered routes, or kaidō, that connected the de facto capital of Japan at Edo (now Tokyo) with the outer provinces during the Edo period (1603–1868). The most important of the routes was the Tōkaidō, which linked Edo and Kyoto. Tokugawa Ieyasu started the construction of the five routes to increase his control over the country in 1601, but it was Tokugawa Ietsuna, the 4th shōgun of the Tokugawa shogunate and Ieyasu's great-grandson, who declared them as major routes. Post stations were set up along the route for travelers to rest and buy supplies. The routes thrived due to the policy of sankin-kōtai, that required the daimyō (regional rulers) to travel in alternate years along the routes to Edo.

== History ==
The various roads that make up the Five Routes existed in some form before becoming an official set of routes. Tokugawa Ieyasu began work on the routes shortly after becoming shōgun in 1600. The official creation of the Five Routes began with the shogunate taking government control of the post stations along the existing routes. Before this intervention, the post stations provided places for travelers to rest and ran a courier system. After the official takeover, the shogunate required that these stations give preferential treatment to those on official business or be forced to cease activity. In the 1640s, shōgun Tokugawa Iemitsu closed down all but the necessary stations, which would be the last major change during the Edo period.

Along with the Post Stations, the government created a system of Check Stations along the Five Routes. Unlike the Post Stations, which provided for travelers, the Check Stations served a regulatory purpose, controlling the movement of people and goods. Some of the uses of these stations were preventing the trafficking of firearms, ensuring that the various rules and policies surrounding the sankin-kōtai were followed, and checking the passports of travelling commoners. Fifty-three Check Stations were created in the 17th century. (This is not to be confused with the 53 Stations of the Tōkaidō, which refers to the Post Stations on the Tōkaidō.)

The shogunate also coordinated general improvements to the roads of the Five Routes. The roads were flattened and widened, with steeper sections paved with rough stone. Trees were planted alongside the road, and drainage ditches dug in many places. Markers were put up to indicate distance at each ri, which was defined at the time as 3.93 km (2.44 mi) from the starting point at Nihonbashi. While the Five Routes crossed many waterways, few bridges were built. Instead, ferry boats were instituted.

== Five Routes ==
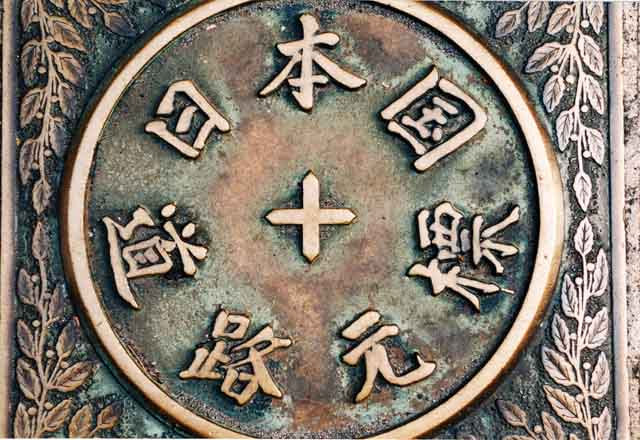
Nihonbashi's highway distance marker, marking the beginning of the five routes

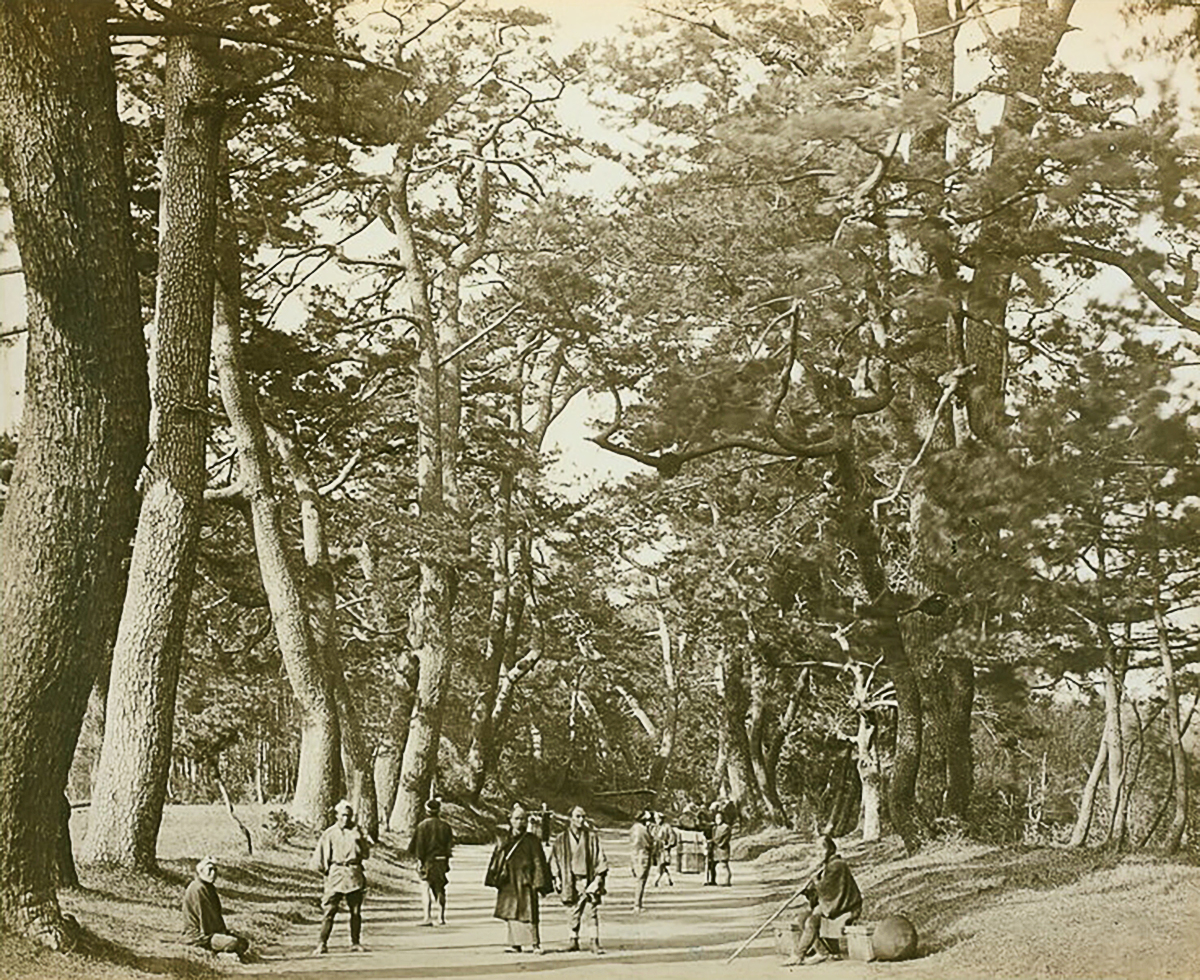
The Tōkaidō in 1865

All five routes started at Nihonbashi in Edo. From that point, each road linked the capital with other parts of the country.

Tōkaidō
The Tōkaidō had 53 stations, connecting with Kyoto. Once it reached Kusatsu-juku, it shared its route with the Nakasendō.
Nakasendō
The Nakasendō (also often called the Kisokaidō) had 69 stations and ran through the center of Honshū, connecting with Kyoto. The Nakasendō's Shimosuwa-shuku served as the end point for the Kōshū Kaidō. Also, the Nakasendō merged with the Tōkaidō at Kusatsu-juku.
Kōshū Kaidō
The Kōshū Kaidō had 44 stations, connecting with Kai Province (Yamanashi Prefecture), before ending at the Nakasendō's Shimosuwa-shuku.
Ōshū Kaidō
The Ōshū Kaidō had 27 stations, connecting with Mutsu Province (Fukushima Prefecture). There were subroutes that connected to other places of northern Japan, too.
Nikkō Kaidō
The Nikkō Kaidō had 21 stations, connecting with Nikkō Tōshō-gū in modern-day Tochigi Prefecture.

== Other official routes ==
As part of the Five Routes network, eight minor routes were also created by the shogunate:

- Aizu Nishi Kaidō
- Honzaka Dōri
- Mibudō
- Minoji
- Mito Kaidō
- Nikkō Onari Kaidō
- Nikkō Reiheishi Kaidō
- Sayaji
- Yamazaki Dōri

== Unofficial routes ==
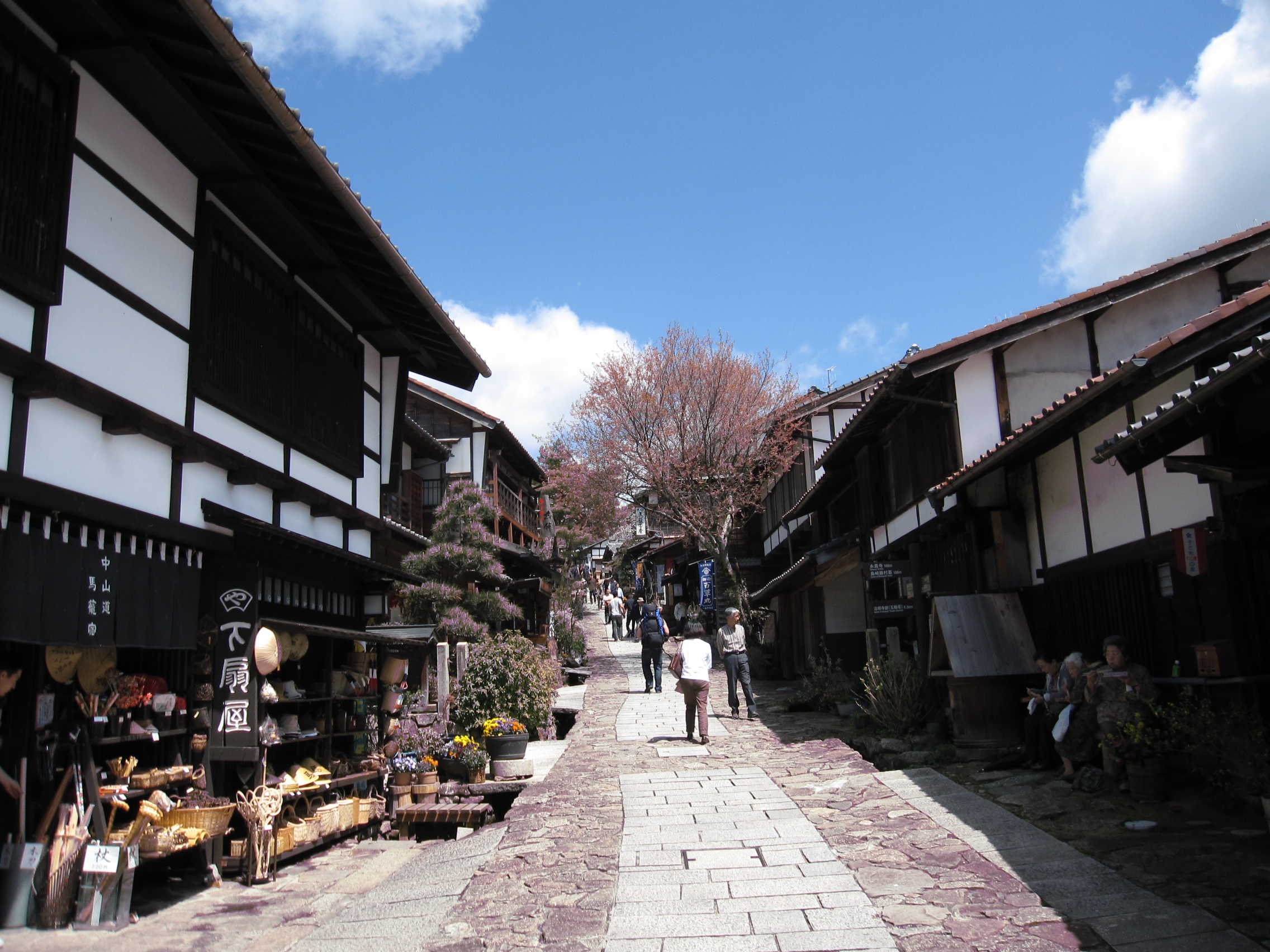
Nakasendō's Magome-juku

In addition to the five routes, there were minor routes that were unofficial branches of or alternates to the main routes, or infrequently used routes. Some of the routes were referred to as hime kaidō, as they were alternate paths for main trade routes, but none were officially called that.

- Bungo Kaidō
- Chichibu Ōkan
- Hokkoku Kaidō
- Hokurikudō
- Kawagoe Kaidō
- Kawagoe Kodama Kaidō
- Kamakura Kaidō
- Kōya Kaidō
- Kyōkaidō
- Matsumaedō
- Mikuni Kaidō
- Nagasaki Kaidō
- Nankaidō
- Nikkō Wakiōkan
- Ōyama Kaidō
- Saigoku Kaidō
- Satsuma Kaidō
- Sendaidō
- Shio no Michi
- Tōgane Onari Kaidō
- Tosa Kaidō
- Ushū Kaidō
- Yamato no Kodō

== See also ==
- Gokishichidō
- Kaidō
- Great Post Road - a similar road in colonial era-Indonesia built in the early 19th century
