= Nikkō Onari Kaidō =

Nikkō Onari Kaidō (日光御成街道) was established during the Edo period as a subroute to Nikkō Kaidō. It was built for the shōgun to use as he traveled to Nikkō Tōshō-gū. It is also referred to as the Nikkō Onarimichi and the Iwatsuki Kaidō.

== Stations of the Nikkō Onari Kaidō ==
The six post stations of the Nikkō Onari Kaidō, with their present-day municipalities listed beside them.

=== Tokyo ===
1. Iwabuchi-juku (岩淵宿) (Kita)

=== Saitama Prefecture ===
2. Kawaguchi-juku (川口宿) (Kawaguchi)
3. Hatogaya-juku (鳩ヶ谷宿) (Kawaguchi)
4. Daimon-juku (大門宿) (Saitama)
5. Iwatsuki-juku (岩槻宿) (Iwatsuki-ku, Saitama)
6. Satte-juku (幸手宿) (Satte)

== See also ==
- Kaidō
- Edo Five Routes
