= Kagoshima Castle =

Castle ruins in Kagoshima, Kagoshima, Japan

- 鹿児島城
- Kagoshima, Kagoshima Japan
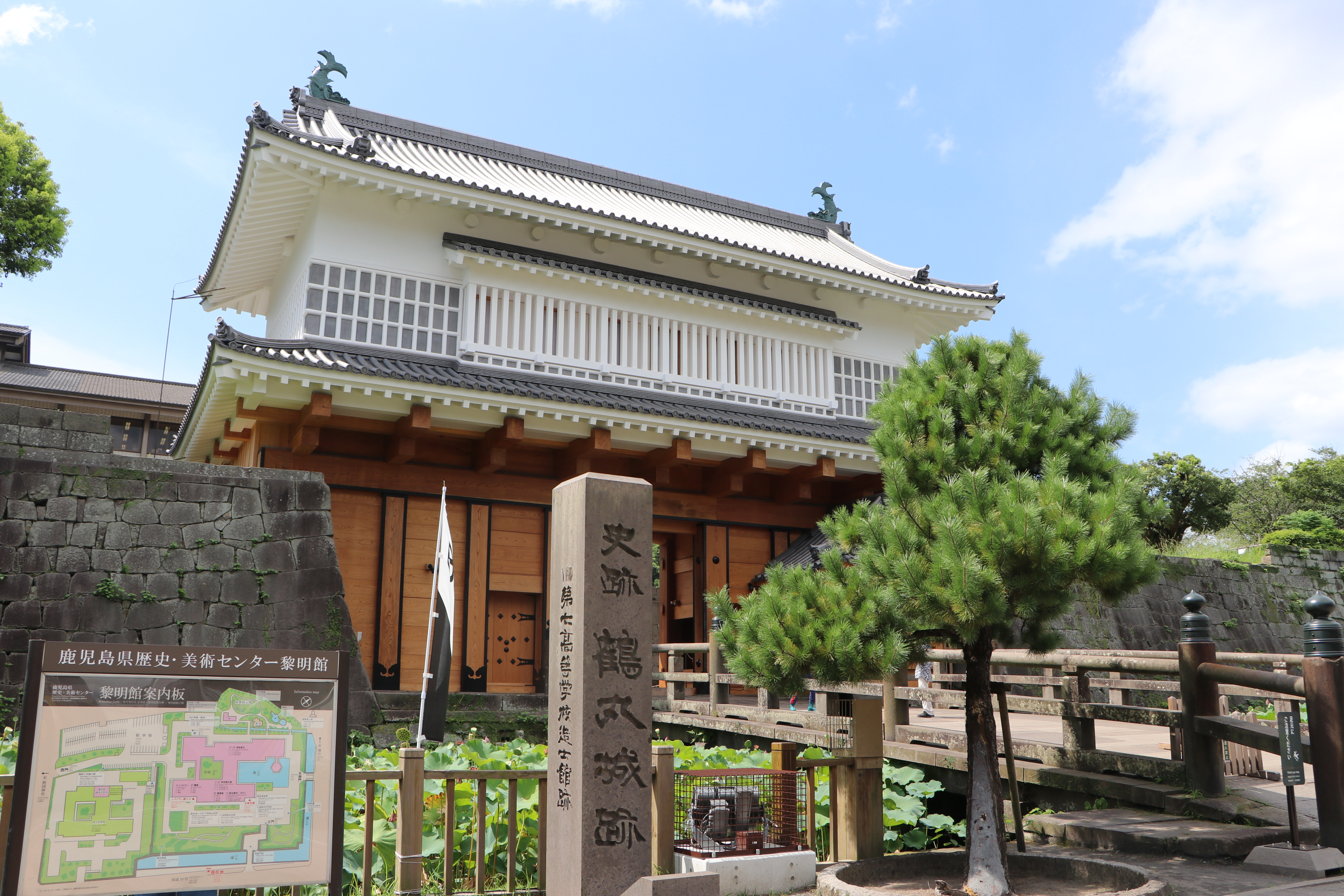
- Reconstructed Goromon Gate of Kagoshima Castle

Site information
- Type: flatland-style Japanese castle
- Controlled by: Satsuma clan
- Open to the public: yes
- Condition: Archaeological and designated national historical site; castle ruins

Location
- Coordinates: 31°35′53.7″N 130°33′15.89″E

Site history
- Built: 1602-1606
- Built by: Shimazu Tadatsune
- In use: Edo period
- National Historic Site of Japan

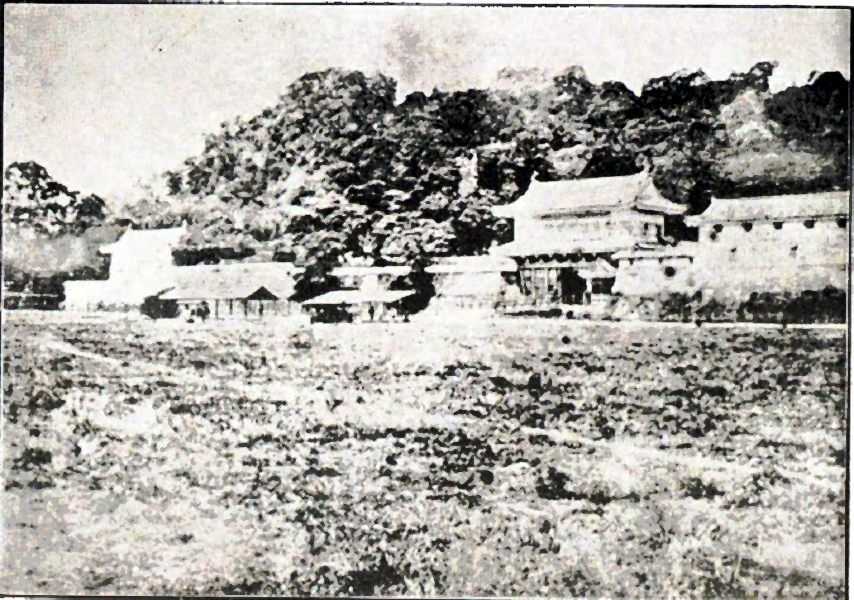
Kagoshima Castle pre-1873

Kagoshima Castle (鹿児島城, Kagoshima-jō) was an Edo period flatland-style Japanese castle located in the city of Kagoshima, Kagoshima Prefecture, Japan. Its ruins have been protected as a National Historic Site since 2023. Kagoshima Castle was listed as one of Japan's Top 100 Castles by the Japan Castle Foundation in 2006.). It is more popular known in Kagoshima as Tsurumaru Castle (鶴丸城)

== Overview ==
Kagoshima Castle was built by Shimazu Tadatsune following the defeat of the Shimazu clan along with the Western Army at the 1600 Battle of Sekigahara. His father Shimazu Yoshihiro had famously led a fighting retreat off of the battlefield and escaped with the bulk of his army intact back to Kyushu. The victorious Tokugawa forces landed in Kyushu to subdue the remnants of the forces loyal to Ishida Mitsunari and Toyotomi Hideyori, but reached a peace agreement with the Shimazu, who agreed to reduce their territory to the provinces of Satsuma and Ōsumi. The previous center of Satsuma and the main stronghold of the Shimazu clan had been in the area of present-day Satsumasendai and Izumi, which were nearer to provincial border with Higo Province. Shimazu Tadatsune therefore decided to relocate his stronghold further south, which was further away from potential invasion by the Tokugawa shogunate and protected by mountainous terrain. The actual site was selected by geomancy and was protected by the Hegigawa River to the east, Satsuma Kaidō to the west, the Kinko Bay to the south, and Mount Shiroyama to the north. He constructed a "yakata-zukuri" style castle, which was more of a large fortified residence than a Japanese castle. It consisted of a main citadel in the north and a secondary citadel to the south, protected by a moats and low walls, and did not have a tenshu or high stone walls. Mount Shiroyama to the rear of the castle was regarded as the redoubt which could be used in case of siege; however, after Tadatsune's death, the mountain was regarded as a sacred area and was placed off-limits. Tadatsune's father, Shimazu Yoshihiro, was adamantly against the construction of Kagoshima Castle due to its indefensible design and its proximity to the coast; however, politically the military weakness of the castle was intended as a political statement verifying the Shimazu clan's submission to the Tokugawa shogunate. The castle was completed in 1604.

Kagoshima Castle was never used in actual battle until the Bakumatsu period, when it came under attack by the Royal Navy during the Anglo-Satsuma War of 1863. Shimazu Yoshihiro's concerns about its proximity the coast were proven accurate; however, as the castle was so inconspicuous, the British mistook a nearby Buddhist temple for a castle tower and fired on it instead.

Following the Meiji restoration, the fledgling Imperial Japanese Army garrisoned the castle. In 1873, the main citadel burned down, including the main gate of the castle. In 1877 the second citadel likewise burned down during the Satsuma Rebellion. The Kagoshima Prefectural Medical School and its affiliated hospital were established on the site of the second citadel in 1882, continuing under various names until it was relocated in 1974. The site is now the location of the Kagoshima Prefectural Library, Kagoshima City Museum of Art, and Kagoshima Prefectural Museum. The main citadel was used by the Kagoshima Seventh High School Zoshikan from 1901 until its destruction in an air raid in 1945. Afterwards, the site became the Faculty of Letters and Sciences of Kagoshima University until 1957, when it was replaced by the National Kagoshima University School of Medicine until 1974. It is now Reimeikan, Kagoshima Prefectural Center for Historical Material, which opened in 1984.

A reconstruction of the Otemon main gate of the castle based on surviving documents and photographs was completed in 2020.

== See also ==
- List of Historic Sites of Japan (Kagoshima)

== Literature ==
- Benesch, Oleg and Ran Zwigenberg (2019). Japan's Castles: Citadels of Modernity in War and Peace. Cambridge: Cambridge University Press. p. 374. ISBN 9781108481946.
- De Lange, William (2021). An Encyclopedia of Japanese Castles. Groningen: Toyo Press. pp. 600 pages. ISBN 978-9492722300.
