= Nikkō Reiheishi Kaidō =

The Nikkō Reiheishi Kaidō (日光例幣使街道) was established during the Edo period as a subroute to Nikkō Kaidō. It connected the Nakasendō with the Nikkō Kaidō.

== Stations of the Nikkō Reiheishi Kaidō ==
The 21 post stations of the Nikkō Reiheishi Kaidō, with their present-day municipalities listed beside them.

=== Gunma Prefecture ===
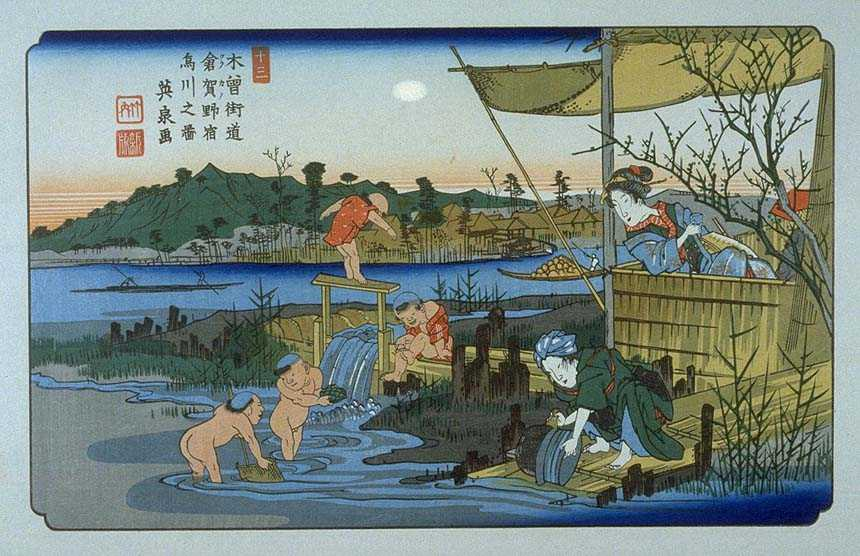
Keisai Eisen's print of Kuragano-shuku, part of the series The Sixty-nine Stations of the Kiso Kaidō

1. Kuragano-shuku (Takasaki) (also part of the Nakasendō)
2. Tamamura-shuku (玉村宿) (Tamamura, Sawa District)
3. Goryō-shuku (五料宿) (Tamamura, Sawa District)
4. Shiba-shuku (柴宿) (Isesaki)
5. Sakai-shuku (境宿) (Isesaki)
6. Kizaki-shuku (木崎宿) (Ōta)
7. Ōta-shuku (太田宿) (Ōta)

=== Tochigi Prefecture ===
8. Yagi-shuku (八木宿) (Ashikaga)
9. Yanada-shuku (梁田宿) (Ashikaga)
10. Tenmyō-shuku (天明宿) (Sano)
11. Inubushi-shuku (犬伏宿) (Sano)
12. Tomida-shuku (富田宿) (Tochigi)
13. Tochigi-shuku (栃木宿) (Tochigi)
14. Kassenba-shuku (合戦場宿) (Tochigi)
15. Kanasaki-shuku (金崎宿) (Tochigi)
16. Niregi-shuku (楡木宿) (Kanuma)
17. Nasahara-shuku (奈佐原宿) (Kanuma)
18. Kanuma-shuku (鹿沼宿) (Kanuma)
19. Fubasami-shuku (文挟宿) (Nikkō)
20. Sakahashi-shuku (板橋宿) (Nikkō)
21. Imaichi-shuku (今市宿) (Nikkō) (also part of the Nikkō Kaidō)

== See also ==
- Kaidō
- Edo Five Routes
