= Kōshū Kaidō =

One of the five routes of the Edo period Japan

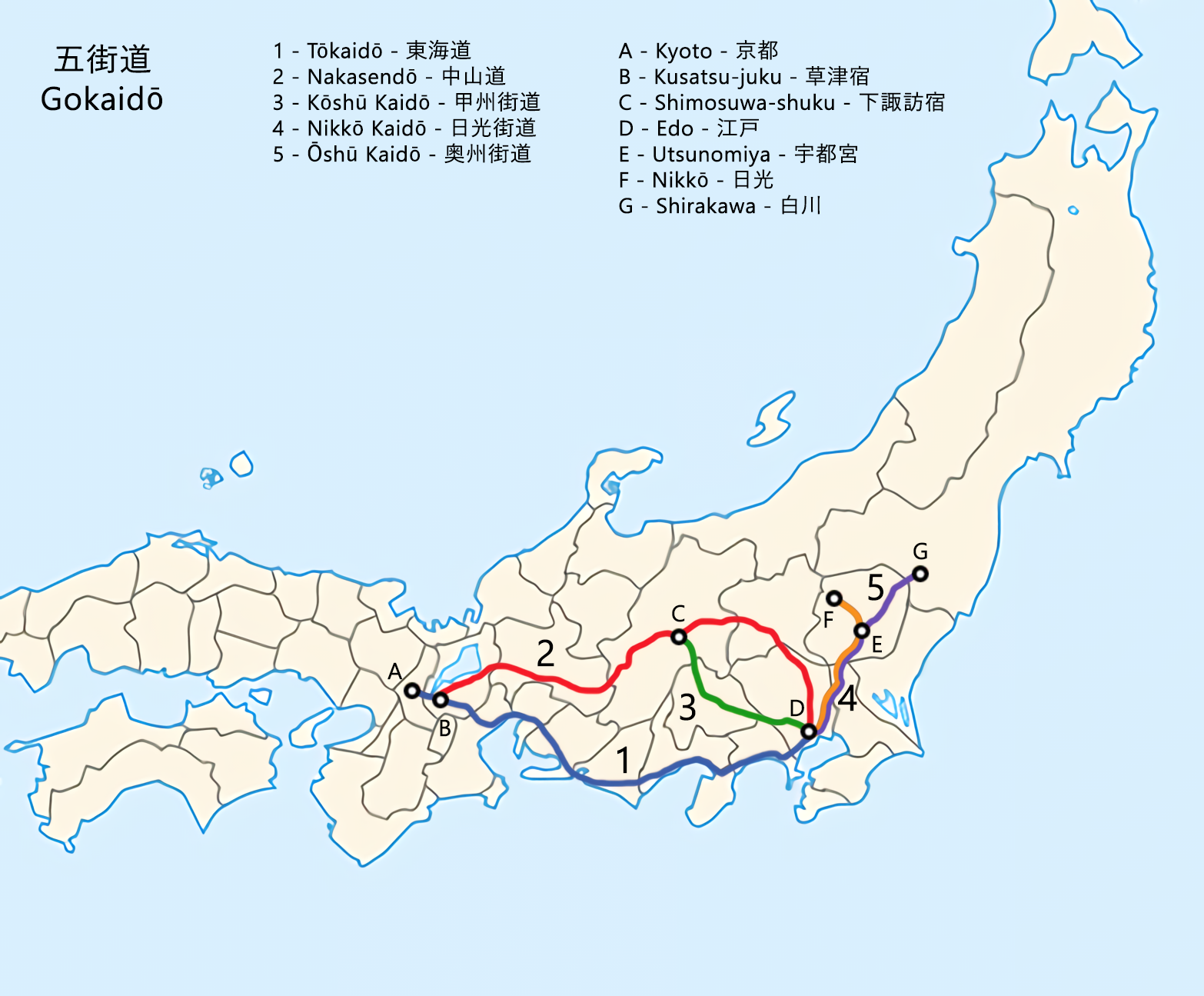
The Five Routes

The Kōshū Kaidō (甲州街道) was one of the five routes or major highways of the Edo period. It was built to connect Edo (modern-day Tokyo) with Kai Province in modern-day Yamanashi Prefecture, Japan. The route continues from there to connect with the Nakasendō's Shimosuwa-shuku in Nagano Prefecture. Many feudal lords from Shinano Province made use of the road during sankin-kōtai, including those from the Takatō, Suwa and Iida domains.

The Kōshū Kaidō's route is followed closely by the modern Route 20.

== Stations of the Kōshū Kaidō ==
There are 44 post stations along the Kōshū Kaidō. They are listed below with they corresponding modern-day municipality listed in parentheses.

=== Tokyo ===
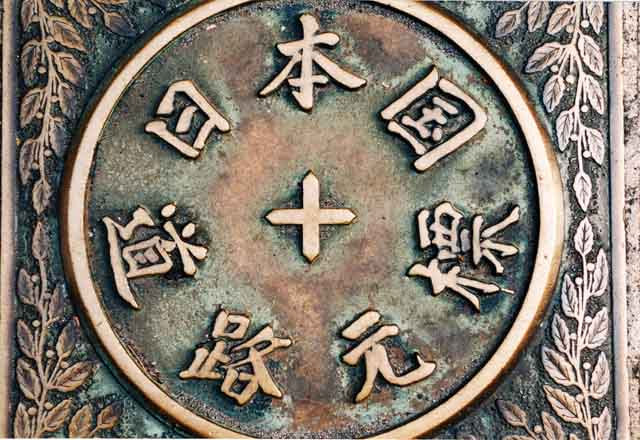
Nihonbashi's highway distance marker, from which modern highway distances are measured

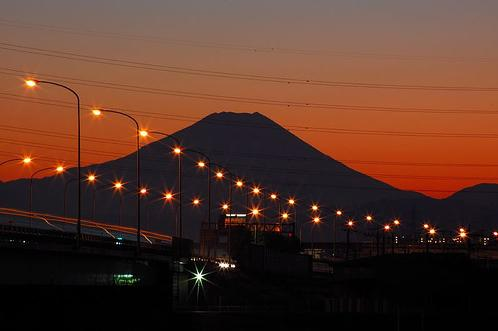
View of Mount Fuji from Tama River in Fuchū

Starting Location: Nihonbashi (Chūō)
1. Naitō Shinjuku (内藤新宿) (Shinjuku)
2. Shimotakaido-shuku (下高井戸宿) (Suginami)
3. Kamitakaido-shuku (上高井戸宿) (Suginami)
4–8: Fuda-Goshuku（布田五宿）: These small posts are collectively referred to as Fuda-Goshuku. 'Goshuku' means five post-stations in Japanese.

4. Kokuryō-shuku (国領宿) (Chōfu)
5. Shimofuda-shuku (下布田宿) (Chōfu)
6. Kamifuda-shuku (上布田宿) (Chōfu)
7. Shimoishihara-shuku (下石原宿) (Chōfu)
8. Kamiishihara-shuku (上石原宿) (Chōfu)

9. Fuchū-shuku (府中宿) (Fuchū)
10. Hino-shuku (日野宿) (Hino)
11. Hachiōji-shuku (八王子宿) (Hachiōji)

a. Intersection/Terminal of the Kanagawa Ōkan (神奈川往還)

12. Komagino-shuku (駒木野宿) (Hachiōji)
13. Kobotoke-shuku (小仏宿) (Hachiōji)

=== Kanagawa Prefecture ===
14. Ohara-shuku (小原宿) (Sagamihara)
15. Yose-shuku (与瀬宿) (Sagamihara)
16. Yoshino-shuku (吉野宿) (Sagamihara)
17. Sekino-shuku (関野宿) (Sagamihara)

=== Yamanashi Prefecture ===
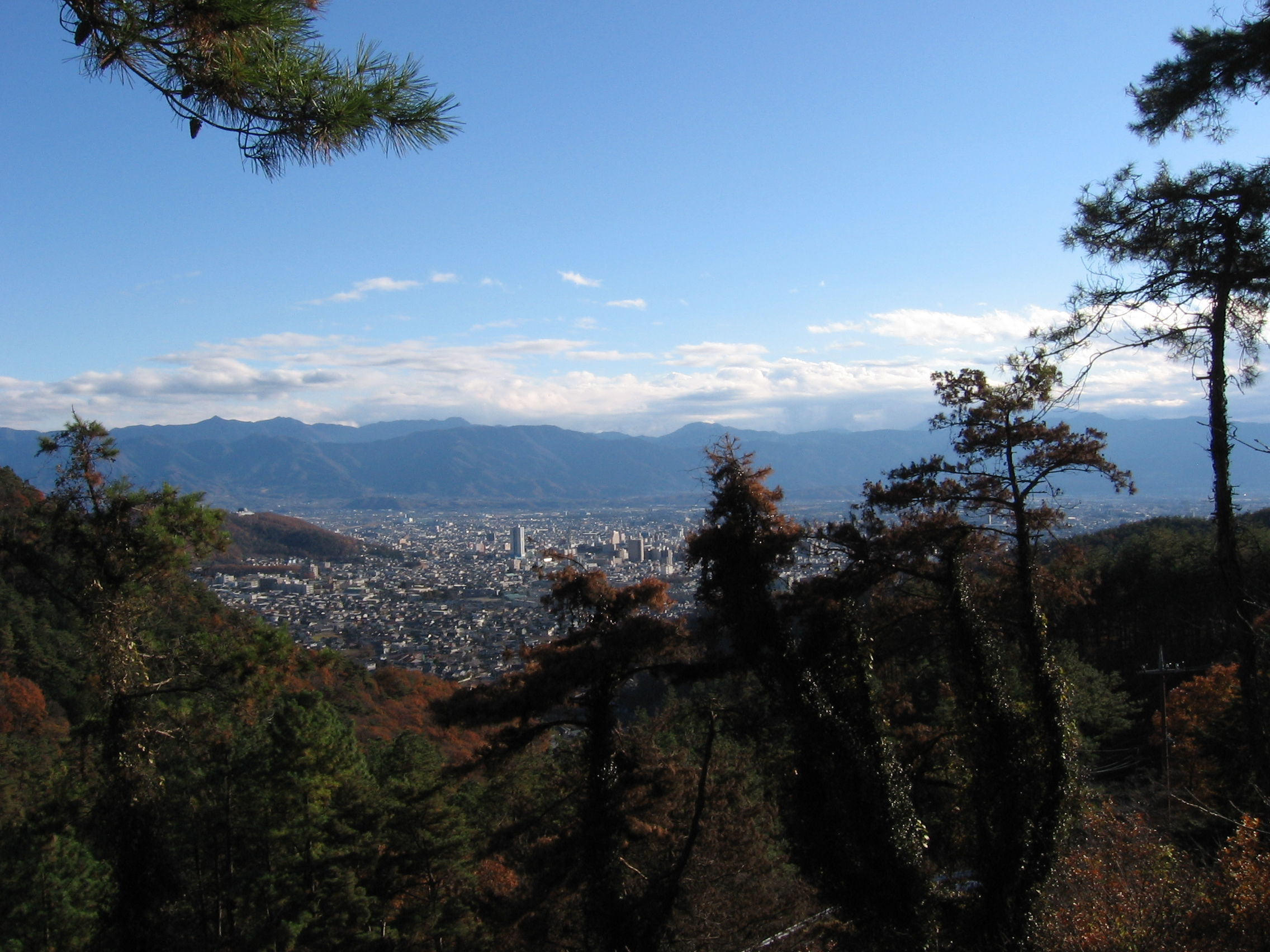
Kōfu

18. Uenohara-shuku (上野原宿) (Uenohara)
19. Tsurukawa-shuku (鶴川宿) (Uenohara)
20. Notajiri-shuku (野田尻宿) (Uenohara)
21. Inume-shuku (犬目宿) (Uenohara)
22. Shimotorisawa-shuku (下鳥沢宿) (Ōtsuki)
23. Kamitorisawa-shuku (上鳥沢宿) (Ōtsuki)
24. Saruhashi-shuku (猿橋宿) (Ōtsuki)
25. Komahashi-shuku (駒橋宿) (Ōtsuki)
26. Ōtsuki-shuku (大月宿) (Ōtsuki)
27. Shimohanasaki-shuku (下花咲宿) (Ōtsuki)
28. Kamihanasaki-shuku (上花咲宿) (Ōtsuki)
29. Shimohatsukari-shuku (下初狩宿) (Ōtsuki)
30. Nakahatsukari-shuku (中初狩宿) (Ōtsuki)
31. Shirano-shuku (白野宿) (Ōtsuki)
32. Kuronoda-shuku (黒野田宿) (Ōtsuki)
33. Komakai-shuku (駒飼宿) (Kōshū)
34. Tsuruse-shuku (鶴瀬宿) (Kōshū)
35. Katsunuma-shuku (勝沼宿) (Kōshū)
36. Kuribara-shuku (栗原宿) (Yamanashi)
37. Isawa-shuku (石和宿) (Fuefuki)
38. Kōfu-shuku (甲府宿) (Kōfu)
39. Nirasaki-shuku (韮崎宿) (Nirasaki)
40. Daigahara-shuku (台ヶ原宿) (Hokuto)
41. Kyōraiishi-shuku (教来石宿) (Hokuto)

=== Nagano Prefecture ===
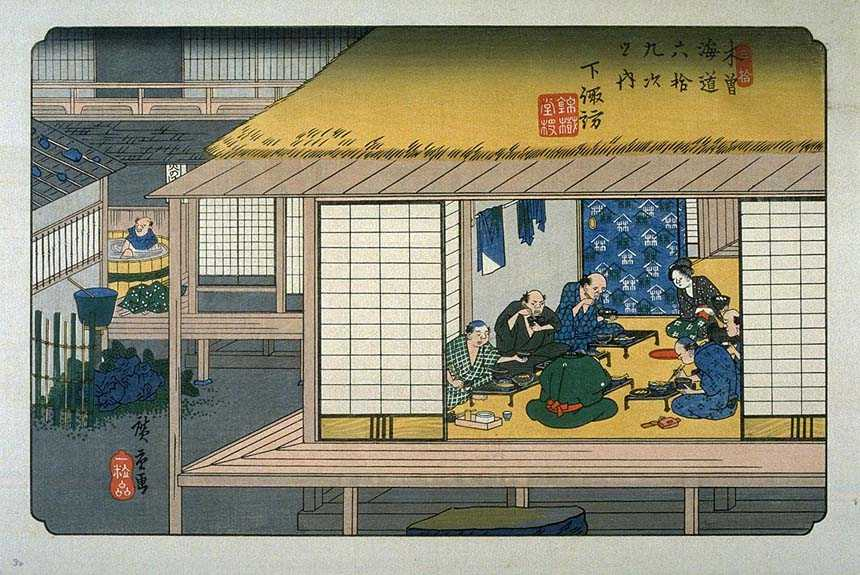
Hiroshige's print of Shimosuwa-shuku, part of The Sixty-nine Stations of the Kiso Kaidō series

42. Tsutaki-shuku (蔦木宿) (Fujimi, Suwa District)
43. Kanazawa-shuku (金沢宿) (Chino)
44. Kamisuwa-shuku (上諏訪宿) (Suwa)
Ending Location: Shimosuwa-shuku (Shimosuwa, Suwa District) (also part of the Nakasendō)

== See also ==
- Edo Five Routes
  - Tōkaidō (or 53 Stations of the Tōkaidō)
  - Nakasendō (or 69 Stations of the Nakasendō)
  - Ōshū Kaidō
  - Nikkō Kaidō
