= Nagasaki Kaidō =

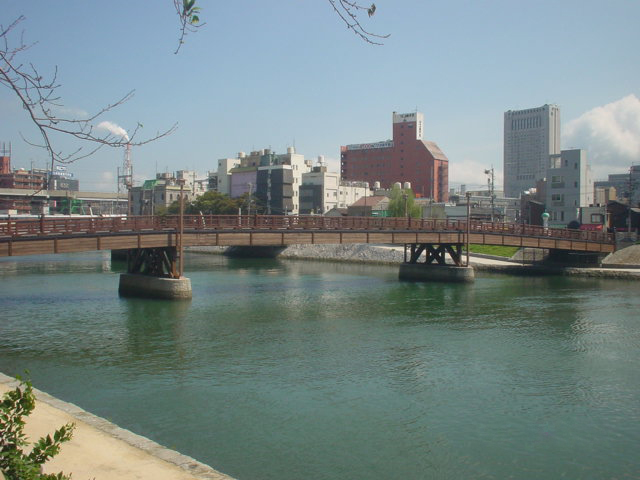
Tokiwa-Bridge in Kokura on the Nagasaki Kaidō

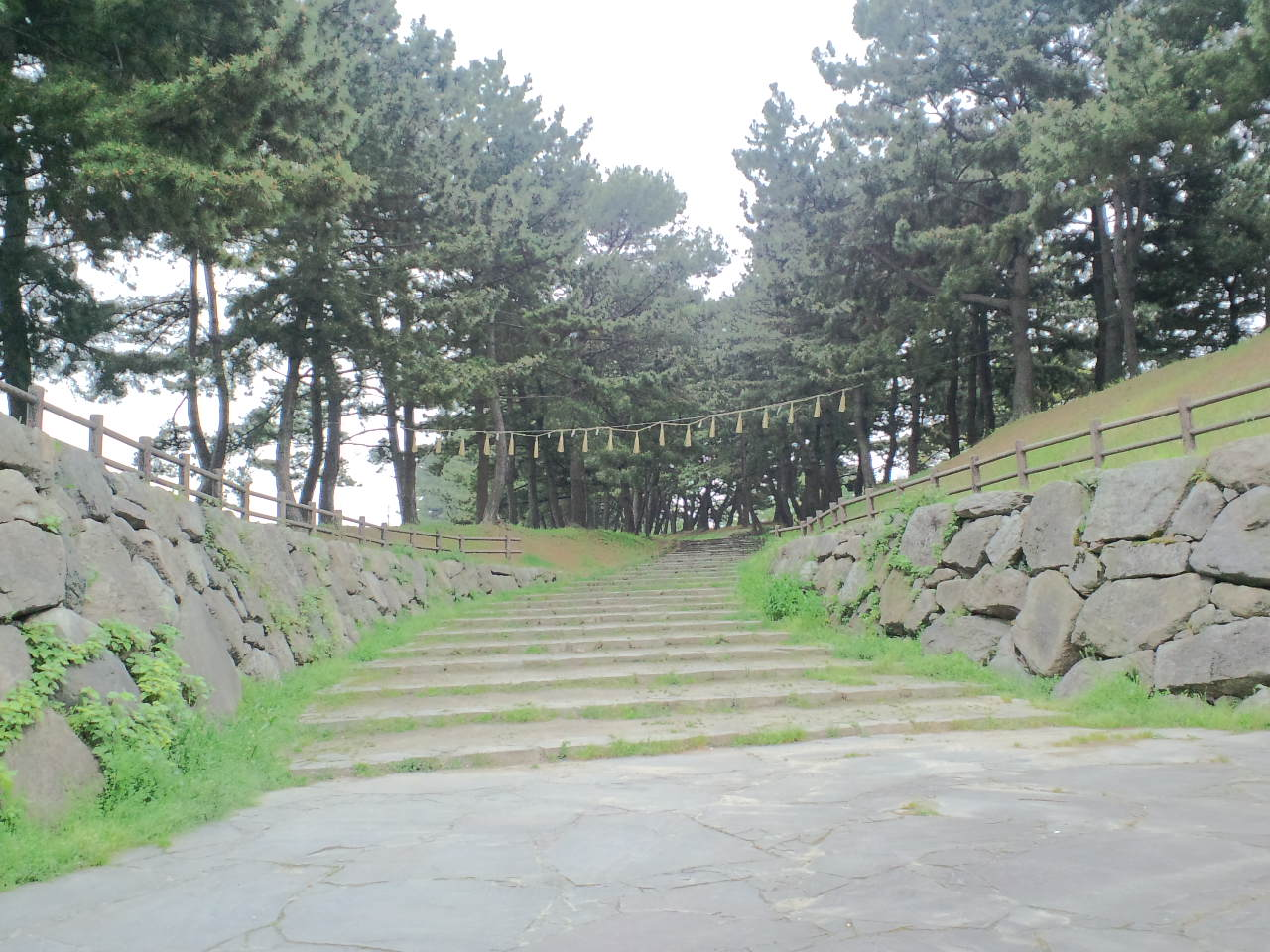
Nagasaki Road near Magari (Kokura)

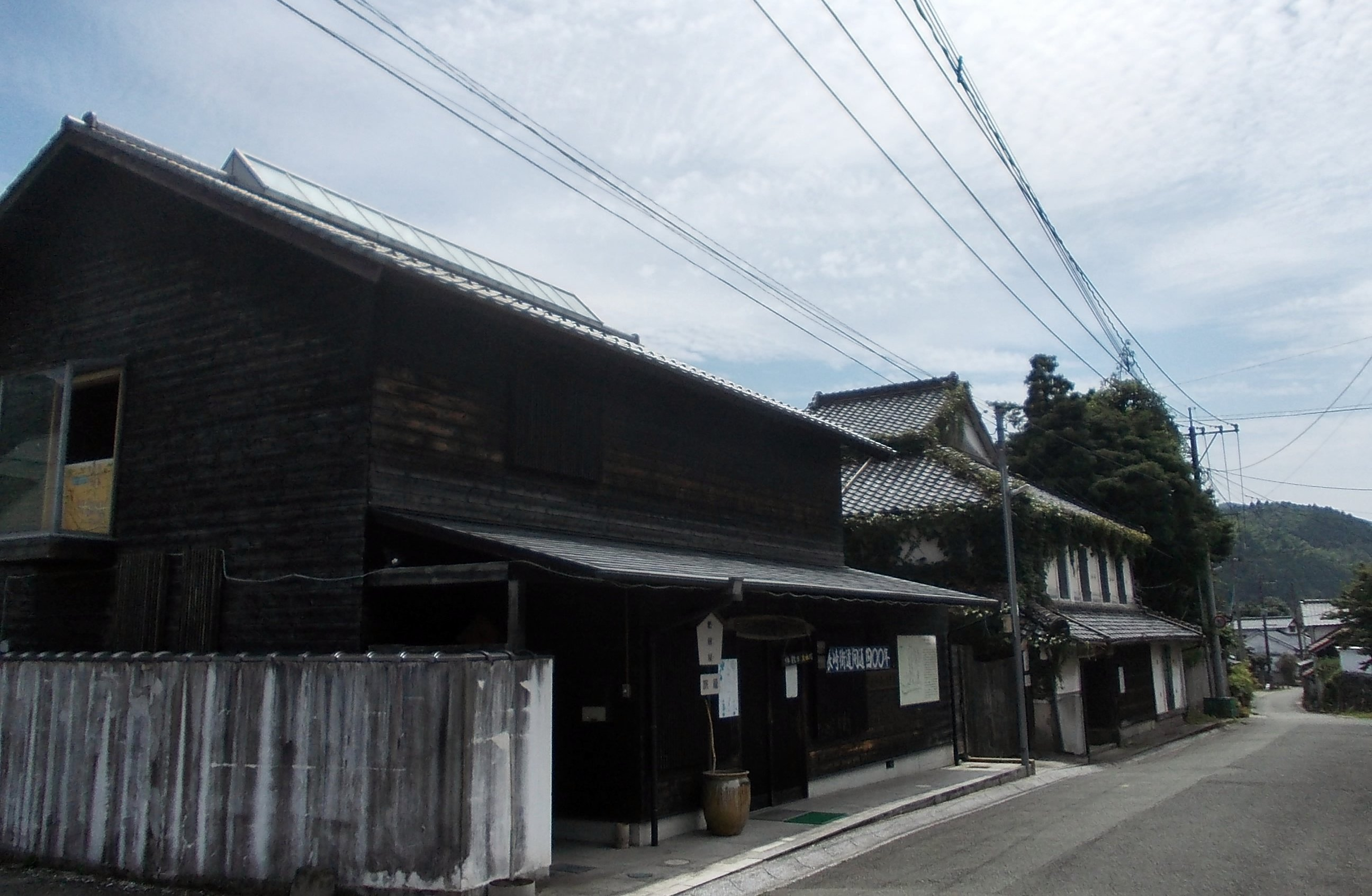
Uchino-shuku in Iizuka

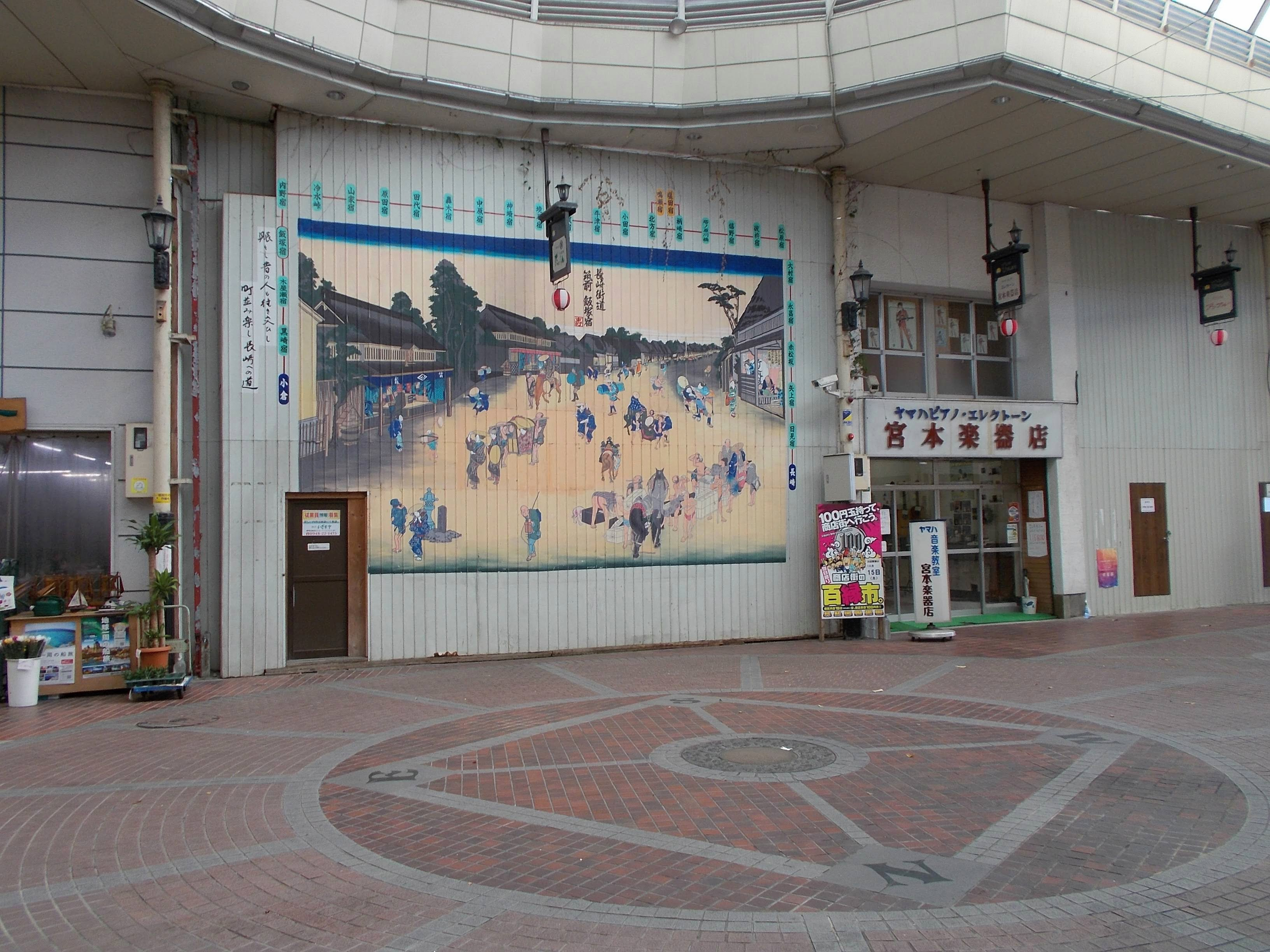
The street art of Iizuka-shuku in Higashimachi Shopping Arcade, Iizuka

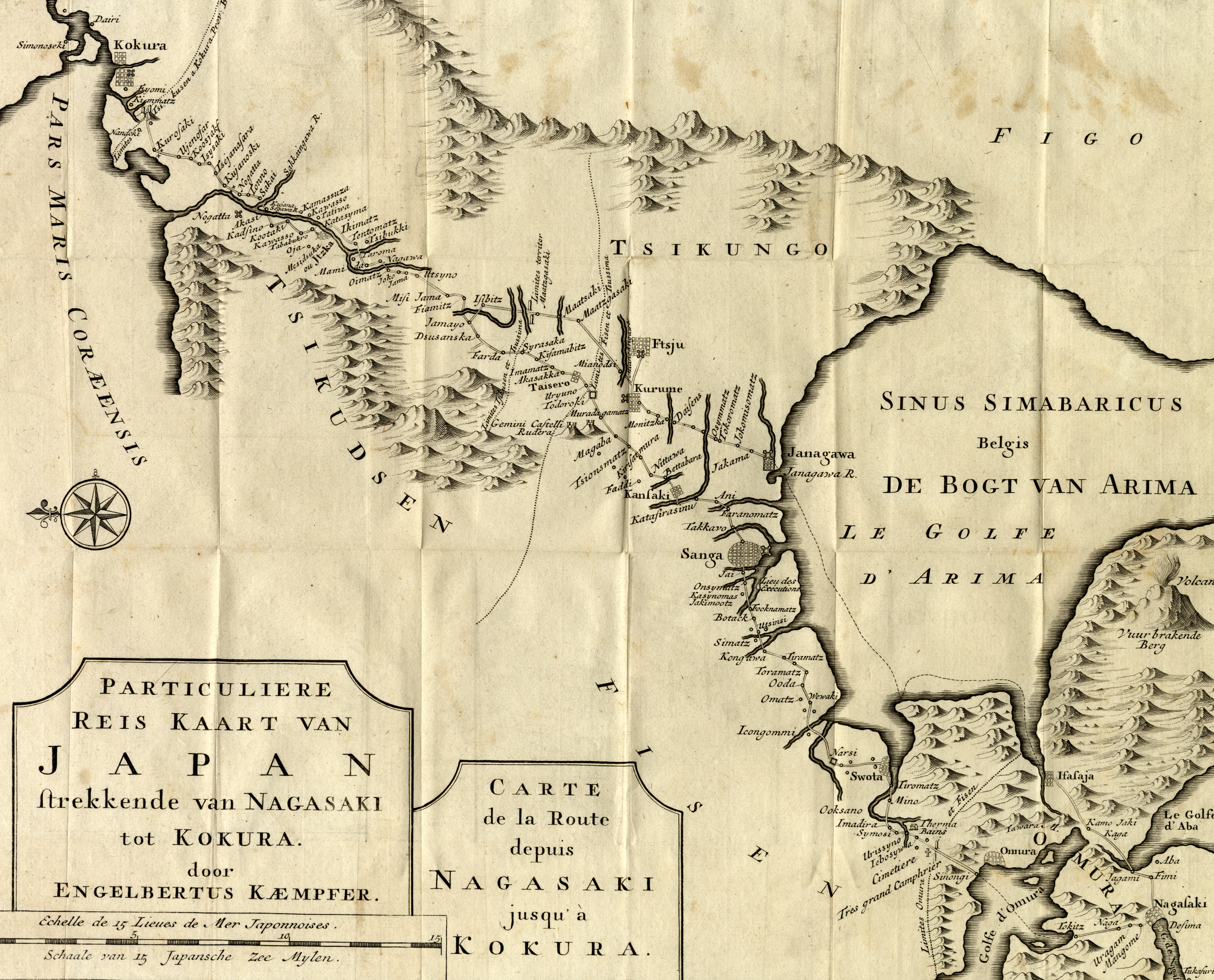
Map of the Nagasaki Kaidō made by Engelbert Kaempfer in 1690–91 (The History of Japan. London 1727)

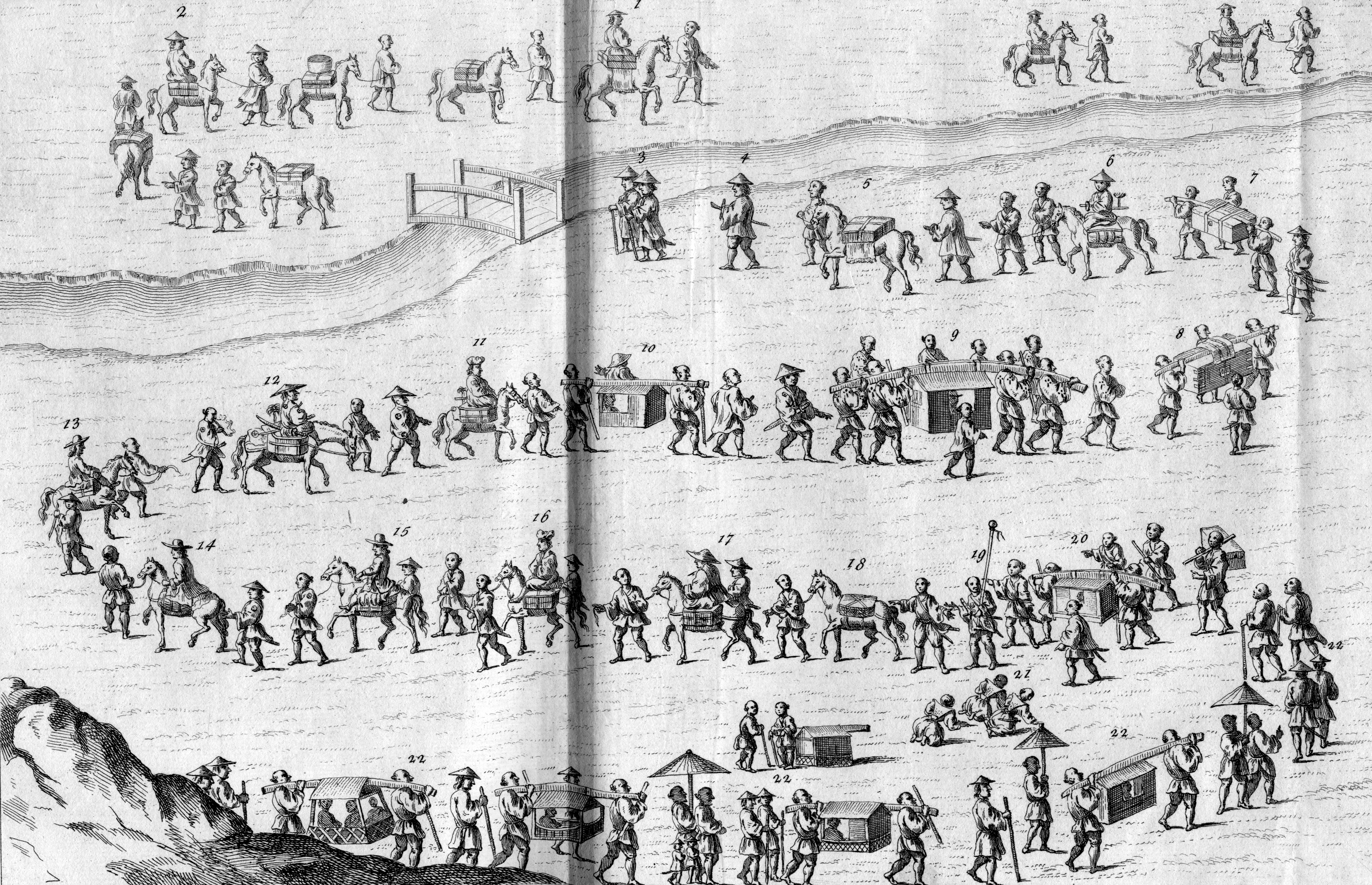
Dutch trading post chief and his entourage (The History of Japan)

The Nagasaki Kaidō (長崎街道) was a road across Kyūshū from Kokura to Nagasaki, used by daimyō for the sankin-kōtai, and also by the chief of the Dutch trading post at Nagasaki on whom a similar obligation of visiting the shōgun was imposed. The route stretched 228 km and took travelers approximately one week.

== Stations of the Nagasaki Kaidō ==
The Nagasaki Kaidō's 25 post stations, as listed in 1705, are listed below with their modern-day municipalities indicated beside them. Travelers visiting Naruse-shuku and Shiota-shuku would avoid Kitagata-shuku and Tsukasaki-shuku.

=== Fukuoka Prefecture ===
Starting Location: Tokiwabashi (常盤橋) (Kokura Kita-ku, Kitakyūshū)
1. Kurosaki-shuku (黒崎宿) (Yahata Nishi-ku, Kitakyūshū)
2. Koyanose-shuku (木屋瀬宿) (Yahata Nishi-ku, Kitakyūshū)
3. Iizuka-shuku (飯塚宿) (Iizuka)
4. Uchino-shuku (内野宿) (Iizuka)
5. Yamae-shuku (山家宿) (Chikushino)
6. Haruda-shuku (原田宿) (Chikushino)

=== Saga Prefecture ===
7. Tashiro-shuku (田代宿) (Tosu)
8. Todoroki-shuku (轟木宿) (Tosu）
9. Nakabaru-shuku (中原宿) (Miyaki, Miyaki District)
10. Kanzaki-shuku (神埼宿) (Kanzaki)
11. Sakaibaru-shuku (境原宿) (Kanzaki)
12. Saga-shuku (佐賀宿) (Saga)
13. Ushizu-shuku (牛津宿) (Ogi)
14. Oda-shuku (小田宿) (Kōhoku, Kishima District)
15. Kitagata-shuku (北方宿) or Naruse-shuku (鳴瀬宿) (Takeo)
16. Tsukasaki-shuku (塚崎宿) or Shiota-shuku (塩田宿) (Takeo)
17. Ureshino-shuku (嬉野宿) (Ureshino)

=== Nagasaki Prefecture ===
18. Sonogi-shuku (彼杵宿) (Higashisonogi, Higashisonogi District)
19. Matsubara-shuku (松原宿) (Ōmura)
20. Ōmura-shuku (大村宿) (Ōmura)
21. Eishō-shuku (永昌宿) (Isahaya)
22. Yagami-shuku (矢上宿) (Nagasaki)
23. Himi-shuku (日見宿) (Nagasaki)
Ending Location: Nagasaki

== See also ==
- Kaidō
- Edo Five Routes
