= Wada-shuku =

Coordinates: 36°12′18″N 138°12′38″E

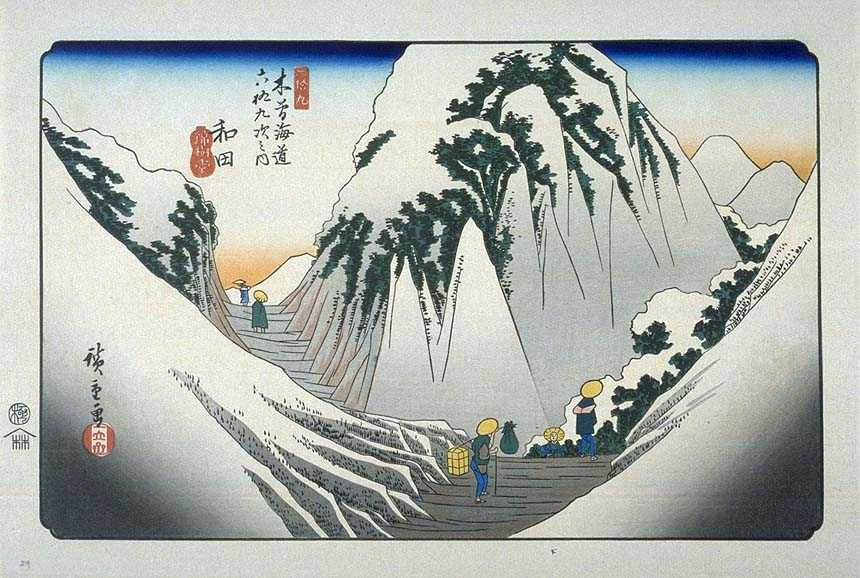
Hiroshige's print of Wada-shuku, part of the series The Sixty-nine Stations of the Kiso Kaidō

Wada-shuku (和田宿, Wada-shuku) was the twenty-eighth of the sixty-nine stations of the Nakasendō highway connecting Edo with Kyoto during the Edo period. It was located in the present-day town of Nagawa, in the Chiisagata District of Nagano Prefecture, Japan.

== History ==
Located at an elevation of 820 m (2,690 ft), at the entrance to the Wada Pass, which was considered one of the most difficult portions of the highway because of its steepness. Because Shimosuwa-juku, the next post station, was over 20 km (12 mi) away, Wada-shuku flourished with over 150 buildings to accommodate all of the travelers and their pack animals. Wada-shuku was approximately 49 ri, 24 chō from the starting point of the Nakasendō at Nihonbashi, or about 195 kilometers.

Present day view of the Nakasendo as it goes through Wada-juku.

Per an 1843 guidebook issued by the Inspector of Highways (道中奉行, Dōchu-būgyō), the town had one honjin, twowaki-honjin, and 28 hatago, with a total resident population of 522 people. Most of the town was destroyed by a fire in 1861 and rebuilt. Presently, there are remains of both the honjin and original houses, which are being restored and preserved. The area is a tourist attraction for Nagawa town. The area has also long been known for its vast resources of obsidian, which have been exploited since the Jōmon period.

== Wada-shuku in The Sixty-nine Stations of the Kiso Kaidō ==
Hiroshige's ukiyo-e print of Wada-shuku dates from 1835–1838. The print depicts an exaggerated view of Wada Pass in wintertime, with Mount Ontake appearing in the upper right corner.

== Neighboring Post Towns ==
Nakasendō
Nagakubo-shuku - Wada-shuku - Shimosuwa-shuku
