= Shimosuwa-shuku =

Coordinates: 36°04′34.9″N 138°05′25.7″E

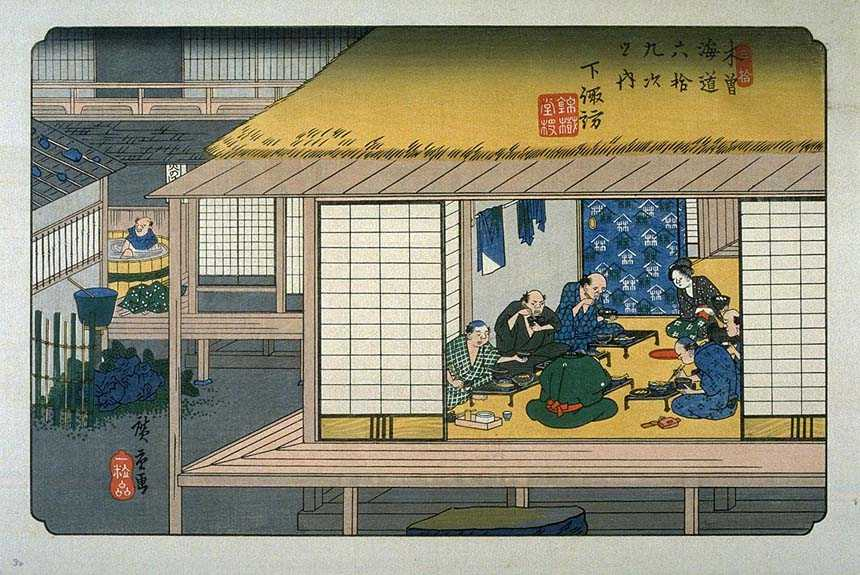
Hiroshige's print of Shimosuwa-shuku, part of the series The Sixty-nine Stations of the Kiso Kaidō

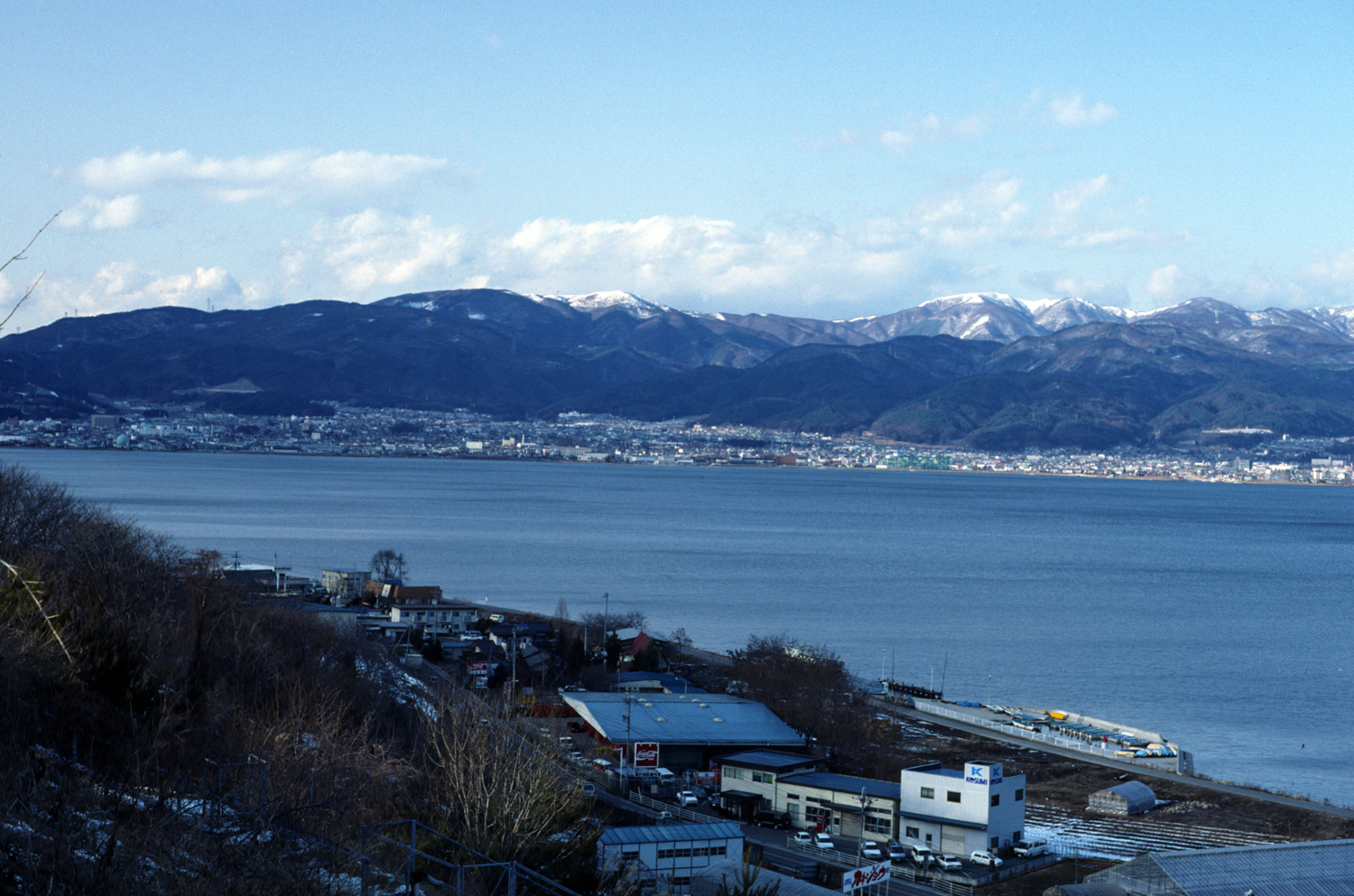
Lake Suwa

Shimosuwa-shuku (下諏訪宿, Shimosuwa-shuku) was the twenty-ninth of the sixty-nine stations of the Nakasendō, as well as being the ending location of the Kōshū Kaidō. It is located in the present-day town of Shimosuwa, Suwa District, Nagano Prefecture, Japan.

== History ==
First built around 1601, Shimosawa-shuku flourished as a post town because it was located between two difficult mountain passes, Wada Pass and Shiojiri Pass. The town's onsens made it a heavily used rest area. It also served as the entrance to the Suwa Taisha.

Records show that in 1843, Shimosuwa-juku had 1,345 residents and 315 buildings. Among the building, there was one honjin, one sub-honjin, and 40 hatago.

== Neighboring post towns ==
Nakasendō
Wada-shuku - Shimosuwa-shuku - Shiojiri-shuku
Kōshū Kaidō
Kamisuwa-shuku - Shimosuwa-shuku (ending location)

== Gallery ==
Intersection of the Nakasendo and Koshukaido routes in Shimosuwa.

Intersection of the Nakasendo and Koshukaido routes in Shimosuwa.

Traditional location of the Shimosuwa-juku official notice board (ja: kōsatsuba).
