= Mount Shiroyama =

Mountain in Mogi, Tochigi, Japan

Mount Shiro (城山, Shiroyama) is a 165 m (541 ft) mountain located in Motegi, Tochigi Prefecture, Japan.

From the Motegi train station it is a thirty-minute walk northeast.

Seasonal festivals are held on its top. In autumn the colors of its tree leaves are very beautiful and in spring its cherry blossoms are very beautiful.

There was also said to be a castle on top of it from 1197.
