= Nikkō Kaidō =

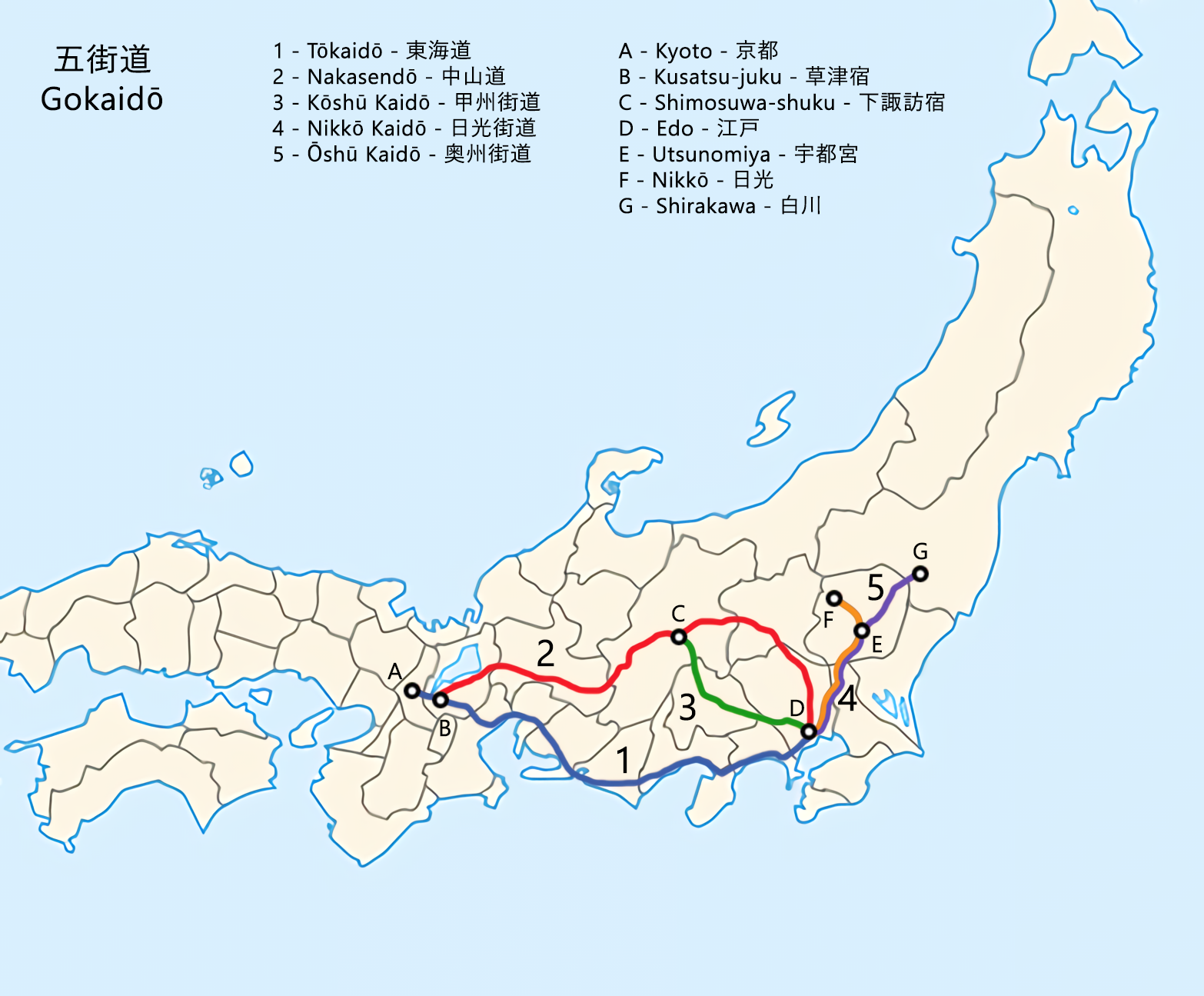
The Five Routes

The Nikkō Kaidō (日光街道) was one of the centrally administered five routes of the Edo period. It was built to connect the de facto capital of Japan at Edo (modern-day Tokyo) with the temple-shrine complex of the Mangan-ji and Tōshōsha (now called the Rinnō-ji and Tōshōgū), which are located in the present-day city of Nikkō, Tochigi Prefecture, Japan. It was an ancient path that became formalised when power moved to Edo, and was established fully in 1617 by Tokugawa Hidetada, to give safer access to the temple-shrine mausoleum of his father, the first shogun Tokugawa Ieyasu, who was buried there that year. With only twenty-one stations, the Nikkō Kaidō was the shortest of the five routes, and it shares seventeen stations with the Ōshū Kaidō. Its route can be traced with Japan's National Route 4 and National Route 119.

== Stations of the Nikkō Kaidō ==
The 21 stations of the Nikkō Kaidō are listed below in order and are divided by their modern-day prefecture. The present day municipality is listed afterwards in parentheses.

=== Tokyo ===
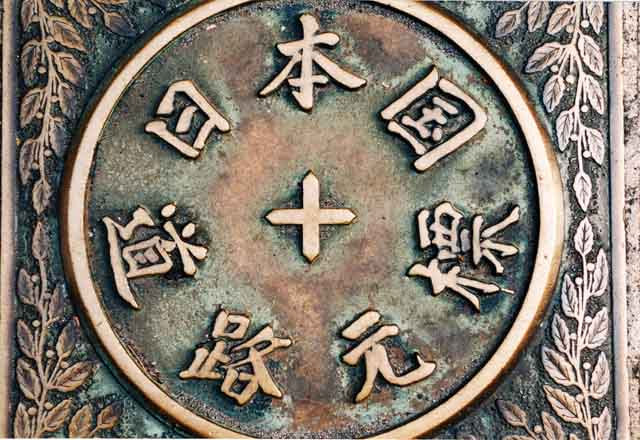
Nihonbashi's highway distance marker

Starting Location: Nihonbashi (日本橋) (Chūō-ku)
1. Senju-shuku (千住宿) (Adachi-ku) (also part of the Mito Kaidō)

=== Saitama Prefecture ===
2. Sōka-shuku (草加宿) (Sōka)
3. Koshigaya-shuku (越ヶ谷宿) (Koshigaya)
4. Kasukabe-shuku (粕壁宿) (Kasukabe)
5. Sugito-shuku (杉戸宿) (Sugito, Kitakatsushika District)
6. Satte-shuku (幸手宿) (Satte)
7. Kurihashi-shuku (栗橋宿) (Kuki)

=== Ibaraki Prefecture ===
8. Nakada-shuku (中田宿) (Koga)
9. Koga-shuku (古河宿) (Koga)

=== Tochigi Prefecture ===
10. Nogi-shuku (野木宿) (Nogi, Shimotsuga District)
11. Mamada-shuku (間々田宿) (Oyama)
12. Oyama-shuku (小山宿) (Oyama)
13. Shinden-shuku (新田宿) (Oyama)

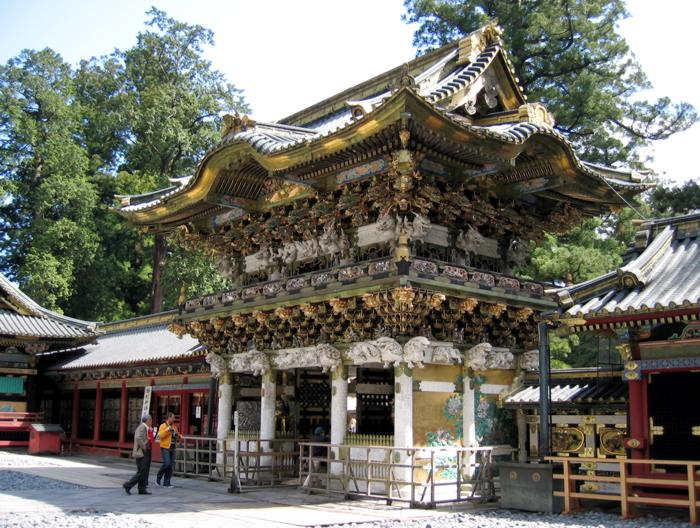
Yomeimon of Tōshō-gū Shrine

14. Koganei-shuku (小金井宿) (Shimotsuke)
15. Ishibashi-shuku (石橋宿) (Shimotsuke)
16. Suzumenomiya-shuku (雀宮宿) (Utsunomiya)
17. Utsunomiya-shuku (宇都宮宿) (Utsunomiya)
18. Tokujirō-shuku (徳次郎宿) (Utsunomiya)
19. Ōzawa-shuku (大沢宿) (Nikkō)
20. Imaichi-shuku (今市宿) (Nikkō) (also part of the Nikkō Reiheishi Kaidō)
21. Hatsuishi-shuku (鉢石宿) (Nikkō)
Ending Location: Nikkō Shinkyō (bridge) (日光神橋) (Nikkō)

== See also ==
- Edo Five Routes
  - Tōkaidō (or 53 Stations of the Tōkaidō)
  - Nakasendō (or 69 Stations of the Nakasendō)
  - Kōshū Kaidō
  - Ōshū Kaidō
- Other Routes
  - Nikkō Onari Kaidō
  - Nikkō Reiheishi Kaidō
  - Nikkō Wakiōkan
