= Kaidō =

Edo period walking roads in Japan

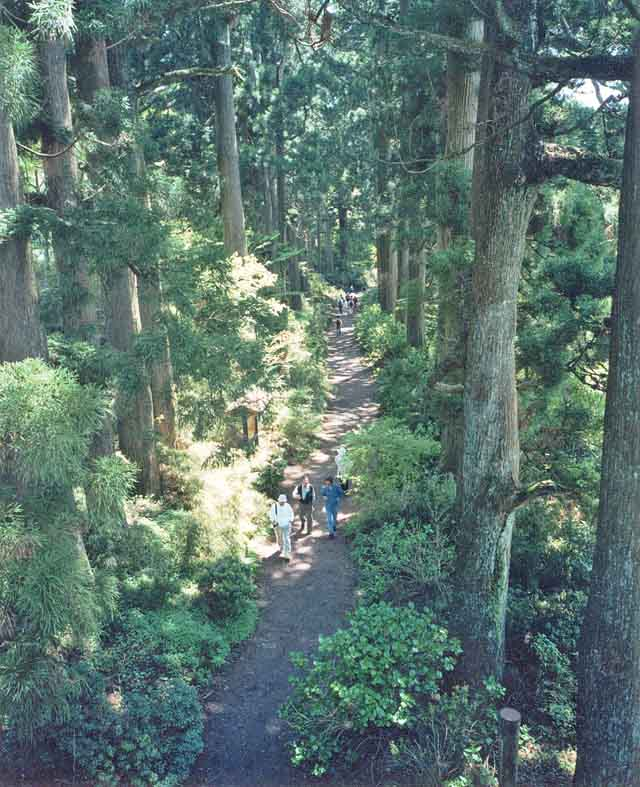
Section of Tōkaidō near Hakone

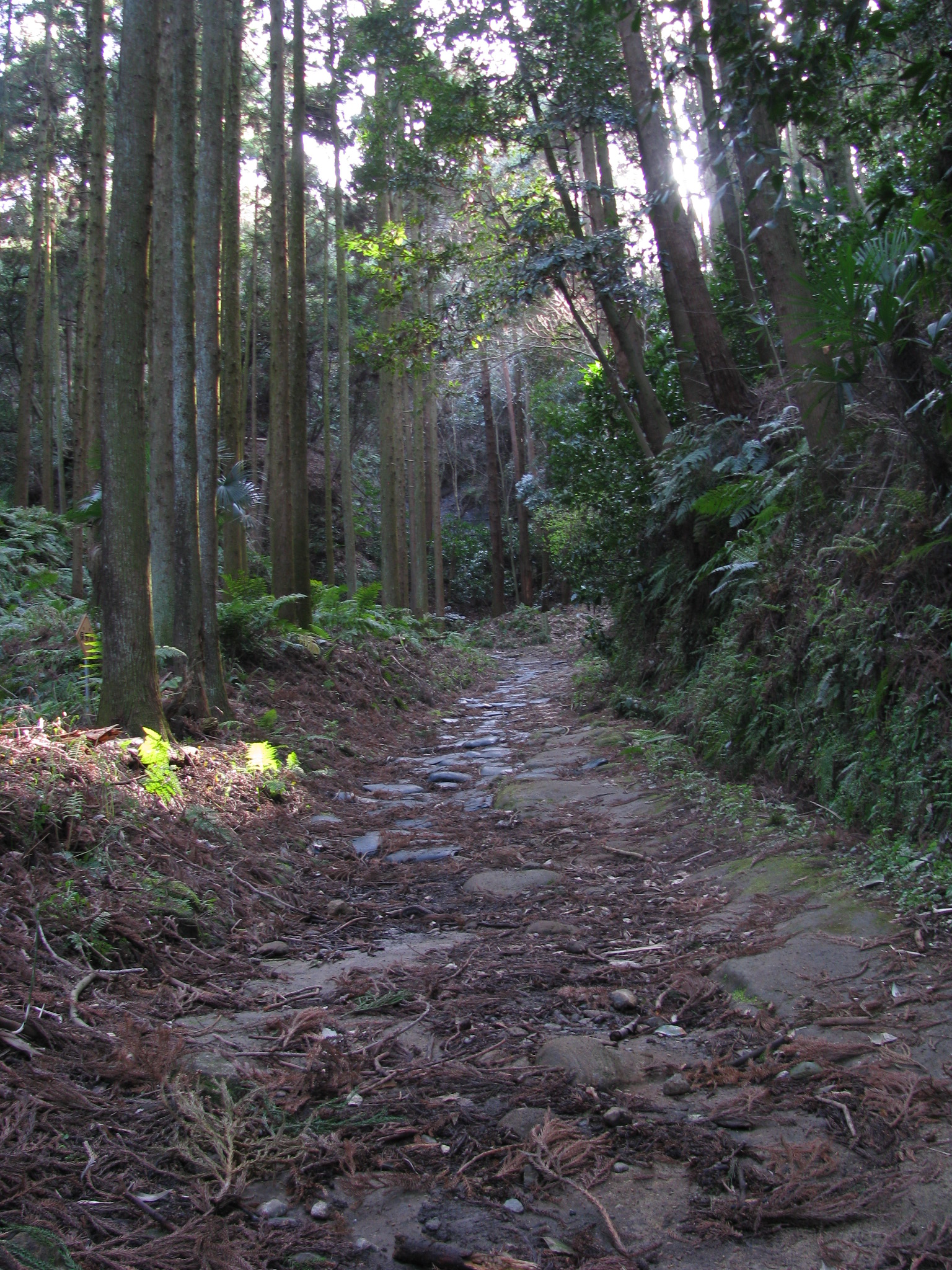
Kamakura Kaidō in old-time atmosphere

Kaidō (街道, 'road') were roads in Japan dating from the Edo period. They played important roles in transportation like the Appian Way of ancient Roman roads. Major examples include the Edo Five Routes, all of which started at Edo (modern-day Tokyo). Minor examples include sub-routes such as the Hokuriku Kaidō and the Nagasaki Kaidō.

Kaidō, however, do not include San'yōdō, San'indō, Nankaidō and Saikaidō, which were part of the even more ancient system of Yamato government called Gokishichidō. These names were used for administrative units, and the roads within these units.

Many highways and railway lines in modern Japan follow the ancient routes and carry the same names. The early roads radiated from the capital at Nara or Kyoto. Later, Edo was the reference, and even today Japan reckons directions and measures distances along its highways from Nihonbashi in Chūō, Tokyo.

== Gokaidō ==
The five main kaidō from Nihonbashi in Edo were:

- Tōkaidō (東海道) to Kyoto along the coastline
- Nakasendō (中山道) to Kyoto through the mountains
- Kōshū Kaidō (甲州街道) to Kōfu
- Ōshū Kaidō (奥州街道) to Shirakawa and other places of northern Japan
- Nikkō Kaidō (日光街道) to Nikkō

== Lodgings ==
At various times, the government established post stations (shukuba) along the roads. These had lodgings for travelers and grew as commercial centers. These former post towns, along with castle and harbor towns, form a major category of cities in Japan.

== Cultural references ==
Kaidō figure prominently in Japanese culture. The poet Matsuo Bashō memorialized his travels along the Ōshū Kaidō (and elsewhere) in the book Oku no Hosomichi. A set of woodblock prints by Hiroshige forms a travelogue of the Tōkaidō. Daimyō, making the required sankin-kōtai trip between their han and Edo, also traveled along the kaidō and stayed at post stations. Some woodblock prints show their stately processions. The Bunraku play Kanadehon Chūshingura, the fictionalized account of the true story of the Forty-seven Ronin, has several scenes set along various kaidō.

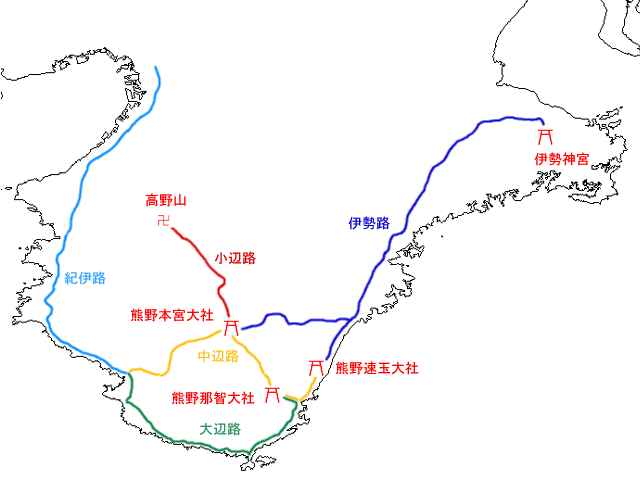
Map of Kumano Kodō, ancient pilgrimage routes
