= Sankin-kōtai =

Tokugawa shogunate policy to control daimyo

Japanese name
- Kana: さんきんこうたい
- Kyūjitai: 參覲交代, 參勤交代, 參覲交替 or 參勤交替
- Shinjitai: 参覲交代, 参勤交代, 参覲交替 or 参勤交替
Transcriptions
- Revised Hepburn: Sankin-kōtai

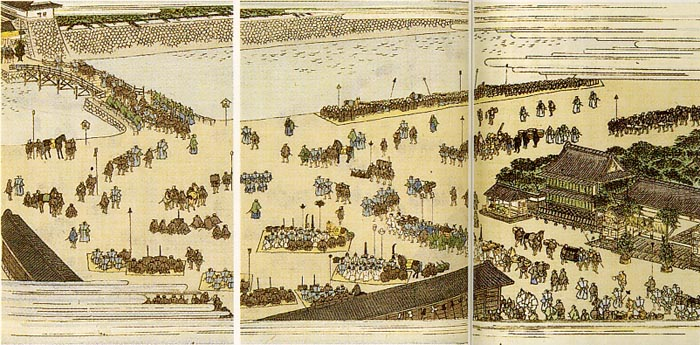
"En masse Attendance of Daimyo at Edo Castle on a Festive Day" from the Tokugawa Seiseiroku, National Museum of Japanese History

Sankin-kōtai (Japanese: 参覲交代/参覲交替, now commonly written as 参勤交代/参勤交替, 'alternate attendance') was a policy of the Tokugawa shogunate during most of the Edo period, created to control the daimyo, the feudal lords of Japan, politically, and to keep them from attempting to overthrow the regime. It required most daimyo to alternate between living in their domain and in the shogunate's capital, Edo, every year. This made the daimyo subject to constant surveillance from the shogunate. This also forced the daimyo to have residences in both their domain and Edo. The cost of maintaining several lavish residences as well as the journeys to and from Edo was a constant drain on the finances of the daimyo, which greatly increased the shogunate's control over them and kept them militarily weak. The daimyo were also required to keep their wives and children in Edo permanently to act as hostages.

== History ==
Toyotomi Hideyoshi had earlier established a similar practice of requiring his feudal lords to keep their wives and heirs at Osaka Castle or its vicinity as hostages to ensure their loyalty. Following the Battle of Sekigahara and the establishment of the Tokugawa Shogunate, this practice was continued at the new capital of Edo as a matter of custom. It was made compulsory for the tozama daimyōs in 1635, and for the fudai daimyōs from 1642. Aside from an eight-year period under the rule of Tokugawa Yoshimune, the law remained in force until 1862.

=== Predecessors ===
The sankin-kōtai system was a natural outgrowth of pre-existing practices which were expanded by the Tokugawa shogunate to further their own political interests. Much of the reason the newly created shogunate could impose sankin-kōtai on the defeated daimyo with ease was due to these immediate predecessors.

==== Kamakura period ====
The Tokugawa period philosopher Kumazawa Banzan wrote in his Daigaku wakumon that the Kamakura shogunate had its own version of alternate attendance, which made gokenin visit the shogun's court in Kamakura for fifty days once every three years. Kumazawa claimed that his account was based on records preserved by the descendants of ancient Kamakura families. Modern scholars have been unable to confirm the existence of such detailed rules, but there is evidence that, at least in principle, Kamakura period gokenin owed some kind of service at the shogun's court. The obligatory ōyuka service required gokenin to attend at the shogun's court for one month. They were also required to attend on special occasions such as comings of age, weddings, and funerals.

The principal duty of the gokenin was ōban'yaku, which was periodic guard duty at Kyoto and Kamakura. It originated as a public duty of the warrior class, requiring performance of guard service in Kyoto in one out of every three years. In 1186, Minamoto no Yoritomo made this service mandatory for gokenin and reduced the duration to six months, and then later to three. In 1275, a similar arrangement was instituted at Kamakura, making gokenin in eastern Japan serve there for one month annually. Important gokenin who frequently performed guard service there maintained residences in Kamakura, even those from remoter regions in western Japan. It was also frequent practice for shugo and jitō to have their sons serve in the shogun's court, acting as hostages. In some cases, families were kept in Kamakura.

These obligations on the Kamakura gokenin had a limiting effect on local independence, like the more rigid sankin-kōtai system that emerged in the Edo period. Shimmi Kichiji claimed that the prolonged absence of the gokenin from their fiefs due to their obligatory attendance at the capital delayed the development of true feudalism in Japan.

== Description ==
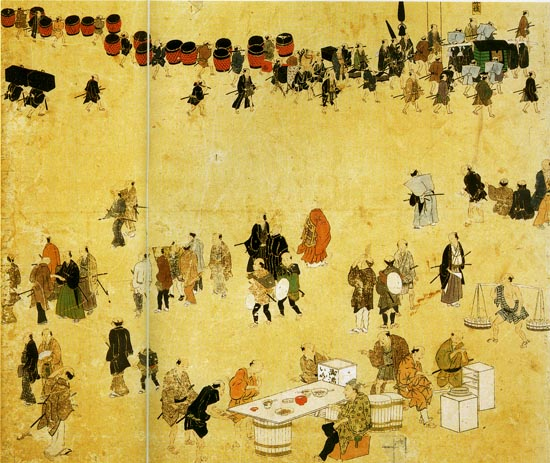
Sightseers and merchants gazing at an entourage (sixth panel) from "Folding Screen Depicting Scenes of the Attendance of Daimyōs at Edo Castle", National Museum of Japanese History

The details changed throughout the 26 decades of Tokugawa rule, but generally, the requirement was that the daimyōs of every han move periodically between Edo and his fief, typically spending alternate years in each place. His wife and heir were required to remain in Edo as hostages while he was away. The expenditures necessary to maintain lavish residences in both places, and for the procession to and from Edo, placed financial strains on the daimyo, making them unable to wage war. The frequent travel of the daimyo encouraged road building and the construction of inns and facilities along the routes, generating economic activity.

There were a number of exceptions for certain fudai daimyōs in the vicinity of Edo, who were allowed to alternate their attendance in Edo every six months instead. Temporary exceptional dispensations were also occasionally granted due to illness or extreme extenuating circumstances.

In principle, the sankin-kōtai was a military service to the shōgun. Each daimyō was required to furnish a number of soldiers (samurai) in accordance with the kokudaka assessment of his domain. These soldiers accompanied the daimyō on the processions to and from Edo.

With hundreds of daimyōs entering or leaving Edo each year, processions (大名行列, daimyō-gyōretsu) were almost daily occurrences in the shogunal capital. The main routes to the provinces were the kaidō. Special lodgings, the honjin (本陣), were available to daimyōs during their travels.

== Effects ==
=== Economic ===
The expense of maintaining lavish residences in both Edo and their domain as well as the costly annual journeys to and from Edo was disastrous for the daimyo and greatly enhanced the political control imposed by the sankin-kōtai system. As the main source of money for most daimyo was mainly dependent on the rice surplus, which was sharply limited by the relative inflexibility of the productive capacity of the han, the incomes of the daimyo were unable to keep up with the increasing financial needs of the daimyo, forcing them to go into debt. Sankin-kōtai expenses regularly made up 70 to 80 percent of the total annual expenditures of daimyo. Economic programs, efforts to increase production, and special taxes were all attempted, but offered no permanent solution. By the Genroku period, practically every daimyo was deep in debt due to the extravagant spending universal during this period. Even the wealthiest feudatory, the Maeda clan of Kaga, began to encounter financial difficulties at this time.

== Similar practices ==
King Louis XIV of France instituted a similar practice upon the completion of his palace at Versailles, requiring the French nobility, particularly the ancient Noblesse d'épée ("nobility of the sword"), to spend six months of each year at the palace, for reasons similar to those of the Japanese shōguns. The nobles were expected to assist the king in his daily duties and state and personal functions, including meals, parties, and, for the privileged, rising from and getting into bed, bathing, and going to church.

== See also ==
- Dutch missions to Edo
- Ryukyuan missions to Edo

== Bibliography ==
- Tsukahira, Toshio (1966). Feudal Control in Tokugawa Japan: the Sankin Kōtai System. East Asian Research Center, Harvard University. ISBN 9780674299009.
- Jansen, Marius B. (2000). The Making of Modern Japan. Harvard University Press. ISBN 978-0-674-00991-2.

Media related to Sankin kōtai at Wikimedia Commons
