= Azumi-Oiwake Station =

Railway station in Azumino, Nagano Prefecture, Japan

Ōito Line30 Azumi-Oiwake Station 安曇追分駅
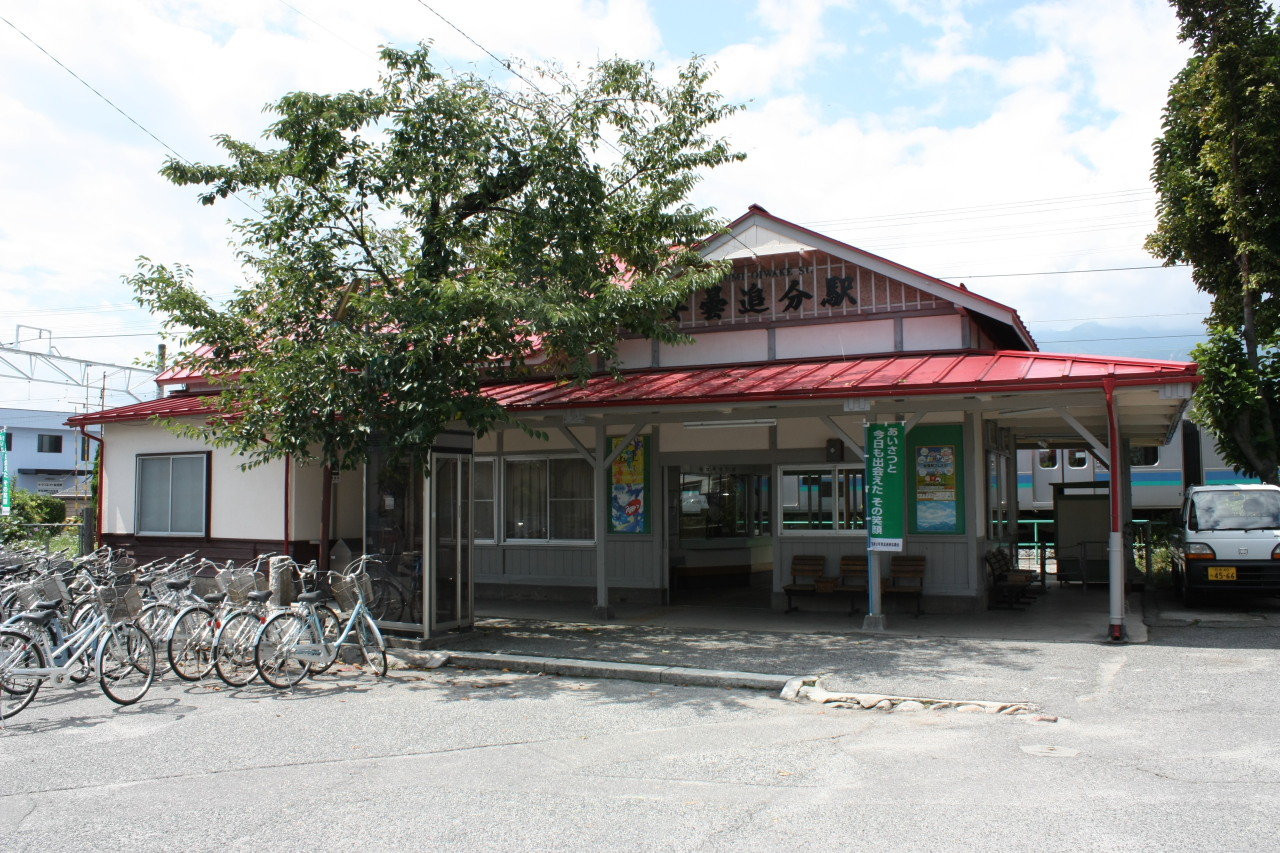
- Azumi-Oiwake Station, September 2008

General information
- Location: 3040-2 Hotaka-Kitahotaka, Azumino-shi, Nagano-ken 399-8302; Japan
- Coordinates: 36°22′17.242″N 137°52′23.21″E
- Elevation: 550.8 meters
- Operator: JR East
- Line: ■ Ōito Line
- Distance: 19.9 km from Matsumoto
- Platforms: 1 island platform

Other information
- Status: Staffed
- Station code: 30
- Website: Official website

History
- Opened: 16 November 1915
- Former names: Alps-Oiwake Station (to 1919)

Passengers
- FY2015: 303

Services
Preceding station	JR East	Following station
Shinano-Matsukawa One-way operation	Ōito Line Rapid	Ariake 31 towards Matsumoto
Hosono 29 towards Minami-Otari	Ōito Line Local	Ariake 31 towards Matsumoto
Location
- Location within Nagano Prefecture Location within Japan

Azumi-Oiwake Station (安曇追分駅, Azumi-Oiwake-eki) is a train station in the city of Azumino, Nagano Prefecture, Japan, operated by East Japan Railway Company (JR East).

== Lines ==
Azumi-Oiwake Station is served by the Ōito Line and is 19.9 kilometers from the terminus of the line at Matsumoto Station.

== Station layout ==
The station consists of one ground-level island platform serving a two tracks, connected to the station building by a level crossing. The station is a Kan'i itaku station.

=== Platforms ===
1	■ Ōito Line	for Hotaka, Toyoshina, and Matsumoto
2	■ Ōito Line	for Shinano-Ōmachi, Hakuba, and Minami-Otari

== History ==
Azumi-Oiwake Station opened on 16 November 1915 as Alps-Oiwake Station (アルプス追分駅). It was renamed to its present name in 1919. With the privatization of Japanese National Railways (JNR) on 1 April 1987, the station came under the control of JR East. A new station building was completed in 2015.

== Passenger statistics ==
In fiscal 2015, the station was used by an average of 303 passengers daily (boarding passengers only).

== Surrounding area ==
- Takasago River
- National Route 147

== See also ==
- List of railway stations in Japan
