= Ariake Station (Nagano) =

Railway station in Azumino, Nagano Prefecture, Japan

Ōito Line31 Ariake Station 有明駅
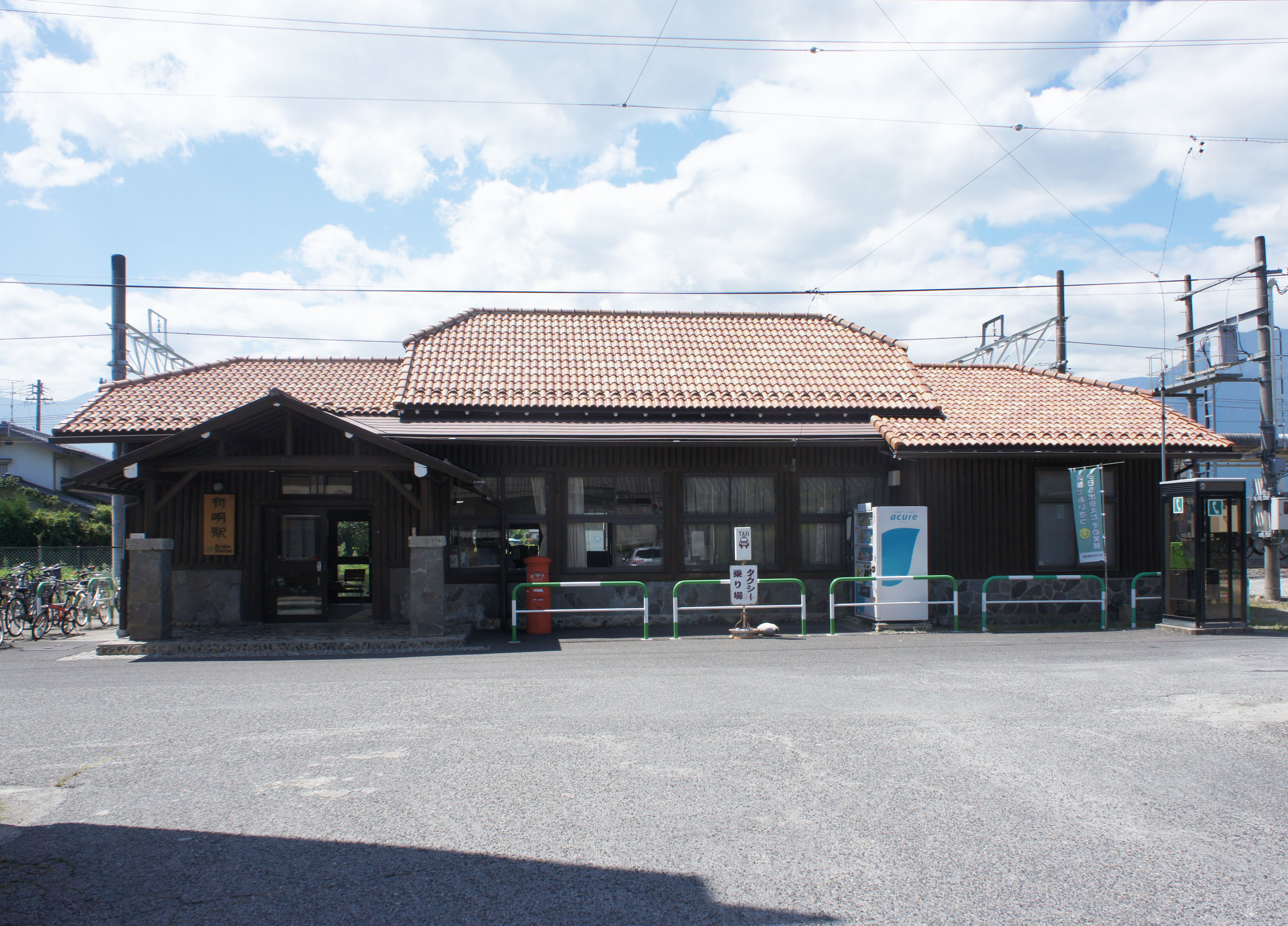
- Ariake Station in August 2021

General information
- Location: 2261 Hotaka-Kitahotaka, Azumino-shi, Nagano-ken 399-8302; Japan
- Coordinates: 36°21′30.978″N 137°52′42.98″E
- Elevation: 539.3 meters
- Operator: JR East
- Line: ■ Ōito Line
- Distance: 18.4 km from Matsumoto
- Platforms: 1 island platform
- Tracks: 2

Other information
- Status: Staffed
- Station code: 31
- Website: Official website

History
- Opened: 8 August 1915

Passengers
- FY2015: 243

Services
Preceding station	JR East	Following station
Azumi-Oiwake One-way operation	Ōito Line Rapid	Hotaka 32 towards Matsumoto
Azumi-Oiwake 30 towards Minami-Otari	Ōito Line Local	Hotaka 32 towards Matsumoto
Location
- Location within Nagano Prefecture Location within Japan

Ariake Station (有明駅, Ariake-eki) is a train station in the city of Azumino, Nagano Prefecture, Japan, operated by East Japan Railway Company (JR East).

== Lines ==
Ariake Station is served by the Ōito Line and is 18.4 kilometers from the terminus of the line at Matsumoto Station.

== Station layout ==
The station consists of one ground-level island platform serving a two tracks, connected to the station building by a footbridge. The station is a Kan'i itaku station.

=== Platforms ===
1	■ Ōito Line	for Hotaka and Matsumoto
2	■ Ōito Line	for Toyoshina, Shinano-Ōmachi and Minami-Otari

== History ==
Ariake Station opened on 8 August 1915. With the privatization of Japanese National Railways (JNR) on 1 April 1987, the station came under the control of JR East.

== Passenger statistics ==
In fiscal 2015, the station was used by an average of 777 passengers daily (boarding passengers only).

== Surrounding area ==
- National Route 147
- Takasegwa River

== See also ==
- List of railway stations in Japan
