= Minami-Ōmachi Station =

Railway station in Ōmachi, Nagano Prefecture, Japan

Ōito Line24 Minami-Ōmachi Station 南大町駅
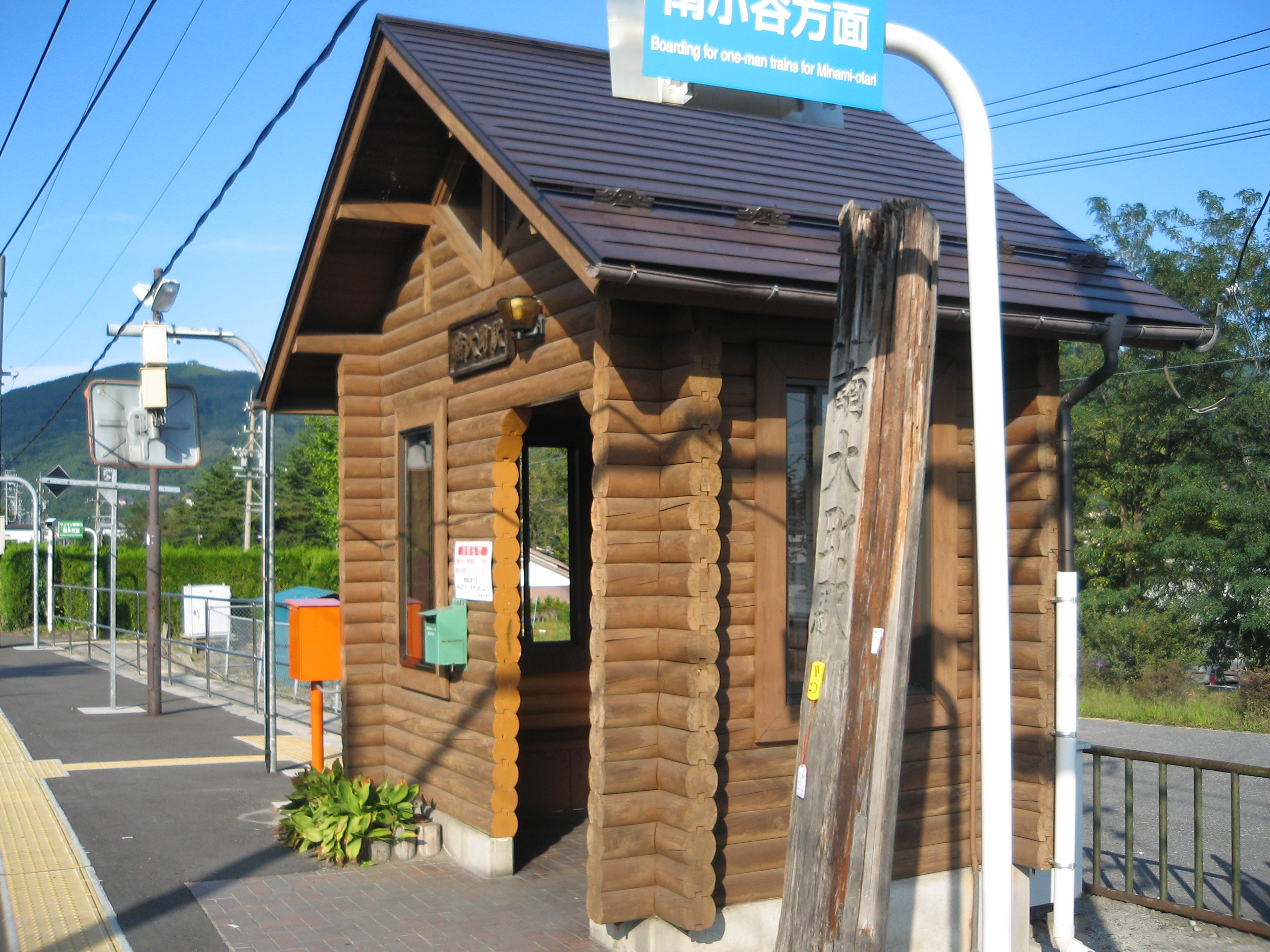
- Minami-Ōmachi Station in September 2009

General information
- Location: Ōmachi-Ōshindenchō, Ōmachi-shi, Nagano-ken 398-0002; Japan
- Coordinates: 36.4913°N 137.8564°E
- Elevation: 710.2 meters
- Operator: JR East
- Line: ■ Ōito Line
- Distance: 34.0 km from Matsumoto
- Platforms: 1 side platform

Other information
- Status: Unstaffed
- Station code: 24
- Website: Official website

History
- Opened: 1 February 1935
- Former names: Shōwa Station (to 1937)

Passengers
- FY2011: 158

Services
Preceding station	JR East	Following station
Shinano-Ōmachi 23 towards Minami-Otari	Ōito Line Local	Shinano-Tokiwa 25 towards Matsumoto
Location
- Location within Nagano Prefecture Location within Japan

Minami-Ōmachi Station (南大町駅, Minami-Ōmachi-eki) is a railway station in the city of Ōmachi, Nagano, Japan, operated by East Japan Railway Company (JR East).

== Lines ==
Minami-Ōmachi Station is served by the Ōito Line and is 34.0 kilometers from the terminus of the line at Matsumoto Station.

== Station layout ==
The station consists of one ground-level side platform serving a single bi-directional track. The station is unattended.

== History ==
Minami-Ōmachi Station opened on 1 February 1935 as Shōwa Station (昭和駅). The station was renamed to its present name on 1 June 1937. With the privatization of Japanese National Railways (JNR) on 1 April 1987, the station came under the control of JR East.

== Surrounding area ==
- Takase River
- National Route 147

== See also ==
- List of railway stations in Japan
