= Kita-Ōmachi Station =

Railway station in Ōmachi, Nagano Prefecture, Japan

Ōito Line22 Kita-Ōmachi Station 北大町駅
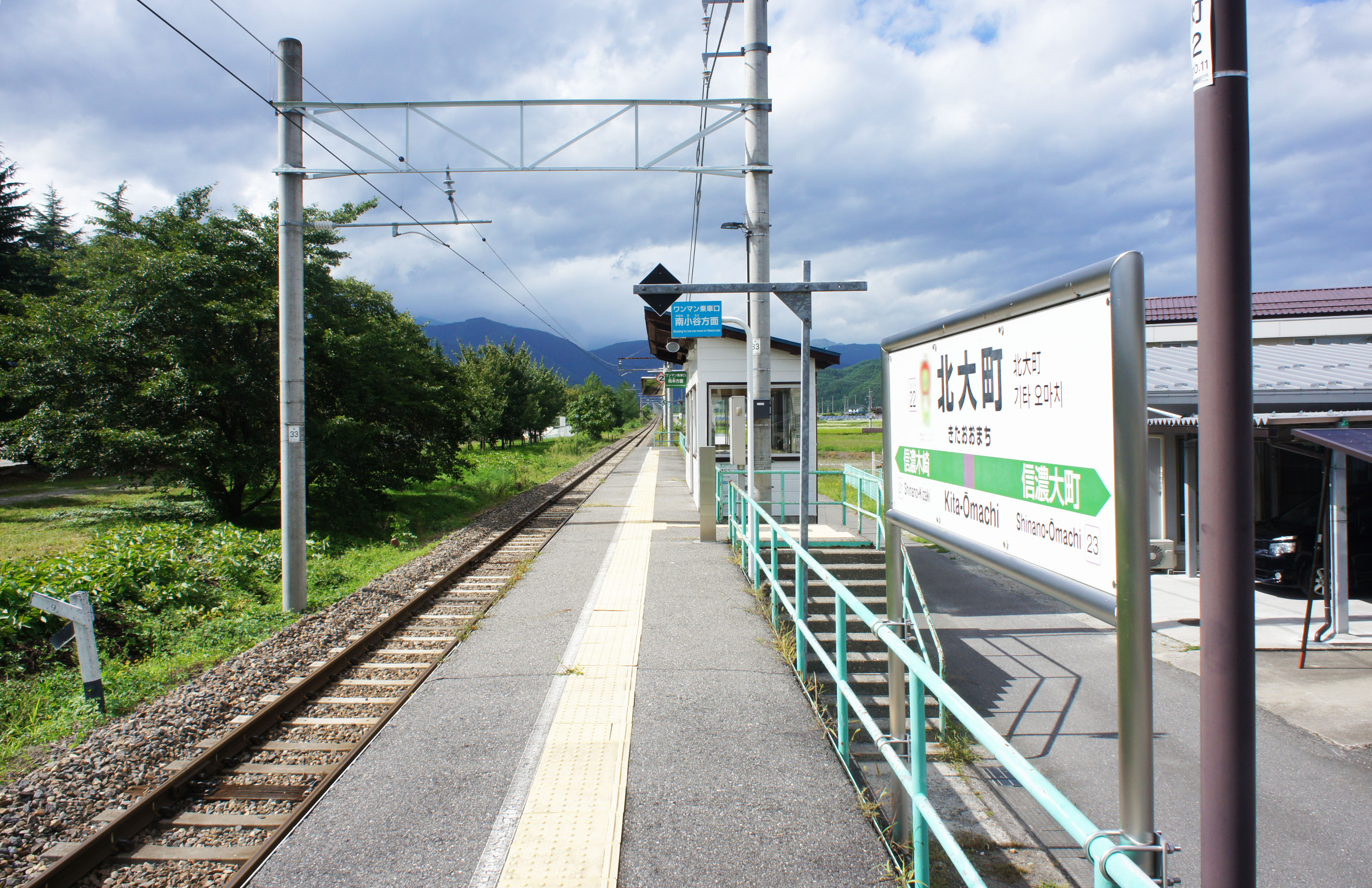
- Kita-Ōmachi Station, August 2021

General information
- Location: Ōmachi-Araizawa, Ōmachi-shi, Nagano-ken 398-0002; Japan
- Coordinates: 36.5178°N 137.8581°E
- Elevation: 731.8 meters
- Operator: JR East
- Line: ■ Ōito Line
- Distance: 37.2 km from Matsumoto
- Platforms: 1 side platform

Other information
- Status: Unstaffed
- Station code: 22
- Website: Official website

History
- Opened: 20 July 1960; 66 years ago

Passengers
- FY2011: 62

Services
Preceding station	JR East	Following station
Shinano-Kizaki 21 towards Minami-Otari	Ōito Line Local	Shinano-Ōmachi 23 towards Matsumoto
Location
- Location within Nagano Prefecture Location within Japan

Kita-Ōmachi Station (北大町駅, Kita-Ōmachi-eki) is a railway station in the city of Ōmachi, Nagano, Japan, operated by East Japan Railway Company (JR East).

== Lines ==
Kita-Ōmachi Station is served by the Ōito Line and is 34.0 kilometers from the terminus of the line at Matsumoto Station.

== Station layout ==
The station consists of one ground-level side platform serving a single bi-directional track. The station is unattended.

== History ==
Kita-Ōmachi Station opened on 20 July 1960. With the privatization of Japanese National Railways (JNR) on 1 April 1987, the station came under the control of JR East.

== Surrounding area ==
- National Route 148

== See also ==
- List of railway stations in Japan
