= Iimori Station =

Railway station in Hakuba, Nagano Prefecture, Japan

Ōito Line14 Iimori Station 飯森駅
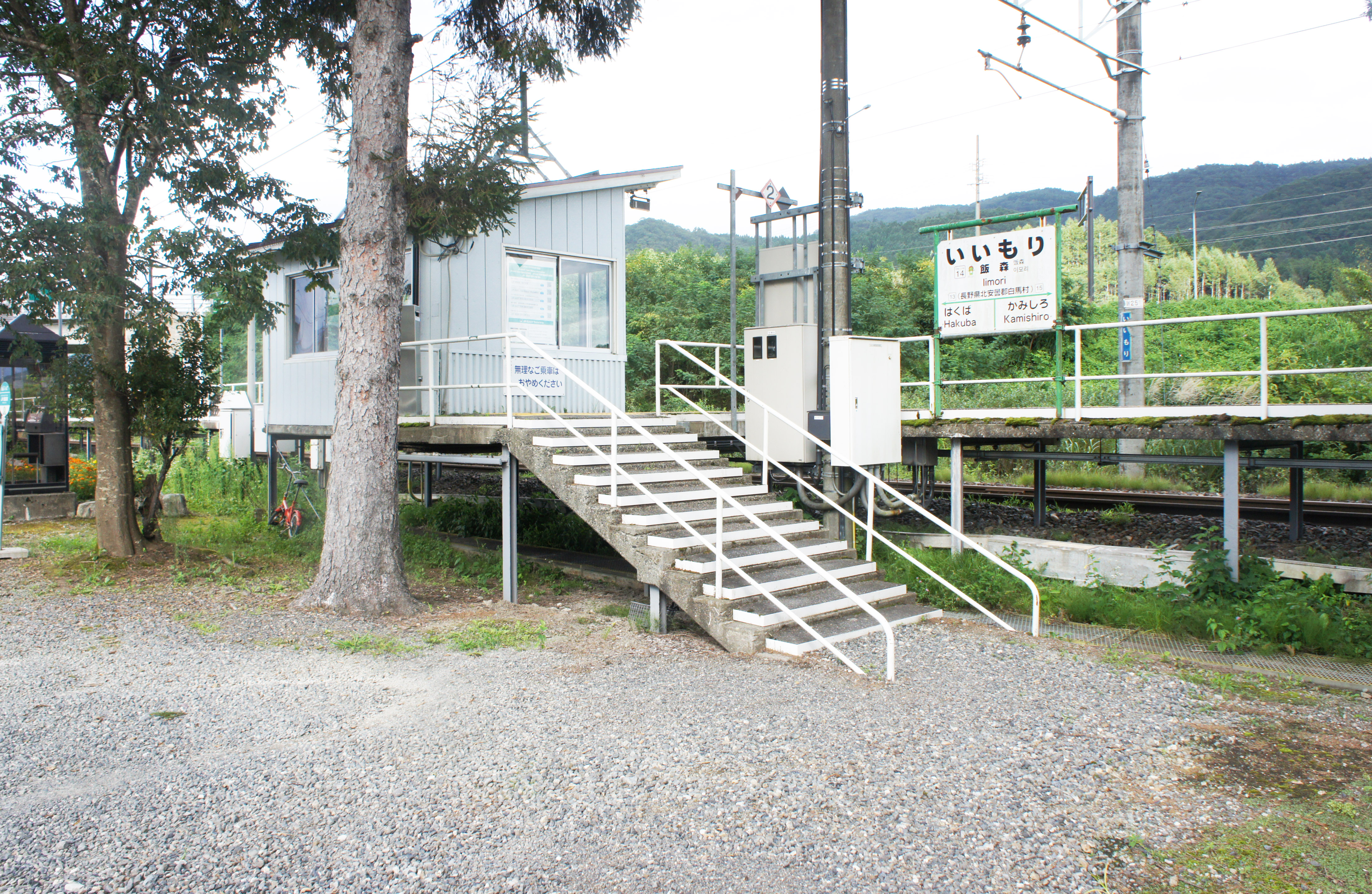
- Iimori Station, August 2021

General information
- Location: Kamishiro-Iimori, Hakuba-mura, Kitaazumi-gun, Nagano-ken 399-9211; Japan
- Coordinates: 36°40′14.43″N 137°51′0.20″E
- Elevation: 719.6 meters
- Operator: JR East
- Line: ■ Ōito Line
- Distance: 56.7 km from Matsumoto
- Platforms: 1 side platform

Other information
- Status: Unstaffed
- Station code: 14
- Website: Official website

History
- Opened: 20 July 1960; 66 years ago

Passengers
- FY2011: 20

Services
Preceding station	JR East	Following station
Hakuba 13 towards Minami-Otari	Ōito Line Local	Kamishiro 15 towards Matsumoto
Location
- Location within Nagano Prefecture Location within Japan

Iimori Station (飯森駅, Iimori-eki) is a railway station in the village of Hakuba, Nagano Prefecture, Japan, operated by the East Japan Railway Company (JR East).

== Lines ==
Iimori Station is served by trains on the Ōito Line and lies 56.7 kilometers from the terminus of the line at Matsumoto Station.

== Station layout ==
The station consists of one ground-level side platform serving a single bi-directional track. The station is unattended.

== History ==
The station opened on 20 July 1960. With the privatization of Japanese National Railways (JNR) on 1 April 1987 the station came under the control of JR East.

== Surrounding area ==
- National Route 148

== See also ==
- List of railway stations in Japan
