= Hotaka Station =

Railway station in Azumino, Nagano Prefecture, Japan

Ōito Line32 Hotaka Station 穂高駅
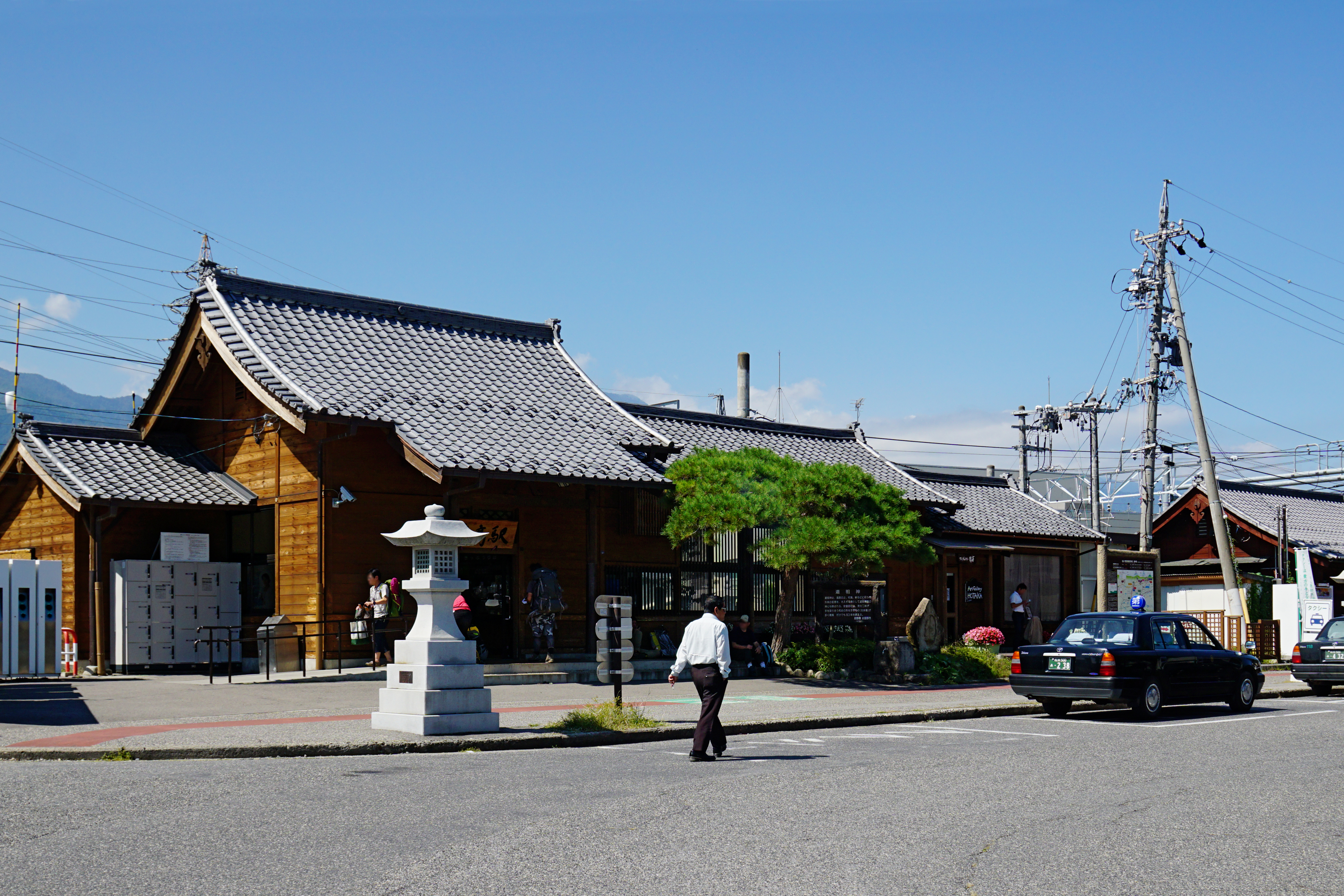
- Hotaka Station in September 2015

General information
- Location: 5944 Hotaka, Azumino-shi, Nagano-ken 399-8303; Japan
- Coordinates: 36°20′23.29″N 137°52′54.62″E
- Elevation: 546.0 meters
- Operator: JR East
- Line: ■ Ōito Line
- Distance: 16.2 km from Matsumoto
- Platforms: 1 island platform

Other information
- Status: Staffed
- Station code: 32
- Website: Official website

History
- Opened: 15 July 1915; 111 years ago

Passengers
- FY2015: 1152

Services
| Preceding station | JR East | Following station |
|---|---|---|
| Shinano-Ōmachi 23 towards Hakuba | Azusa | Toyoshina 34 towards Chiba or Tokyo |
| Ariake One-way operation | Ōito Line Rapid | Hakuyachō 33 towards Matsumoto |
| Ariake 31 towards Minami-Otari | Ōito Line Local | Hakuyachō 33 towards Matsumoto |
Location
- Location within Nagano Prefecture Location within Japan

Hotaka Station (穂高駅, Hotaka-eki) is a train station in the city of Azumino, Nagano Prefecture, Japan, operated by East Japan Railway Company (JR East).

== Lines ==
Hotaka Station is served by the Ōito Line and is 16.2 kilometers from the terminus of the line at Matsumoto Station.

== Station layout ==
The station consists of one ground-level island platform serving a two tracks, connected to the station building by a level crossing. The station has a Midori no Madoguchi staffed ticket office. The station building is modelled after nearby Hotaka Jinja (Hotaka Shrine).

=== Platforms ===
| 1 | ■ Ōito Line | for Toyoshina, Hitoichiba, Matsumoto and Shiojiri |
| 2 | ■ Ōito Line | for Shinano-Matsukawa, Shinano-Ōmachi, Hakuba and Minami-Otari |

== History ==
Hotaka Station opened on 15 July 1915. The present station building was completed in 1940. With the privatization of Japanese National Railways (JNR) on 1 April 1987, the station came under the control of JR East.

== Passenger statistics ==
In fiscal 2015, the station was used by an average of 1,152 passengers daily (boarding passengers only).

== Surrounding area ==
- former Hotaka Town Hall
- National Route 147

== See also ==
- List of railway stations in Japan
