= Nakatsuchi Station =

Railway station in Otari, Nagano Prefecture, Japan

Coordinates: 36.8060°N 137.9074°E

Nakatsuchi Station 中土駅
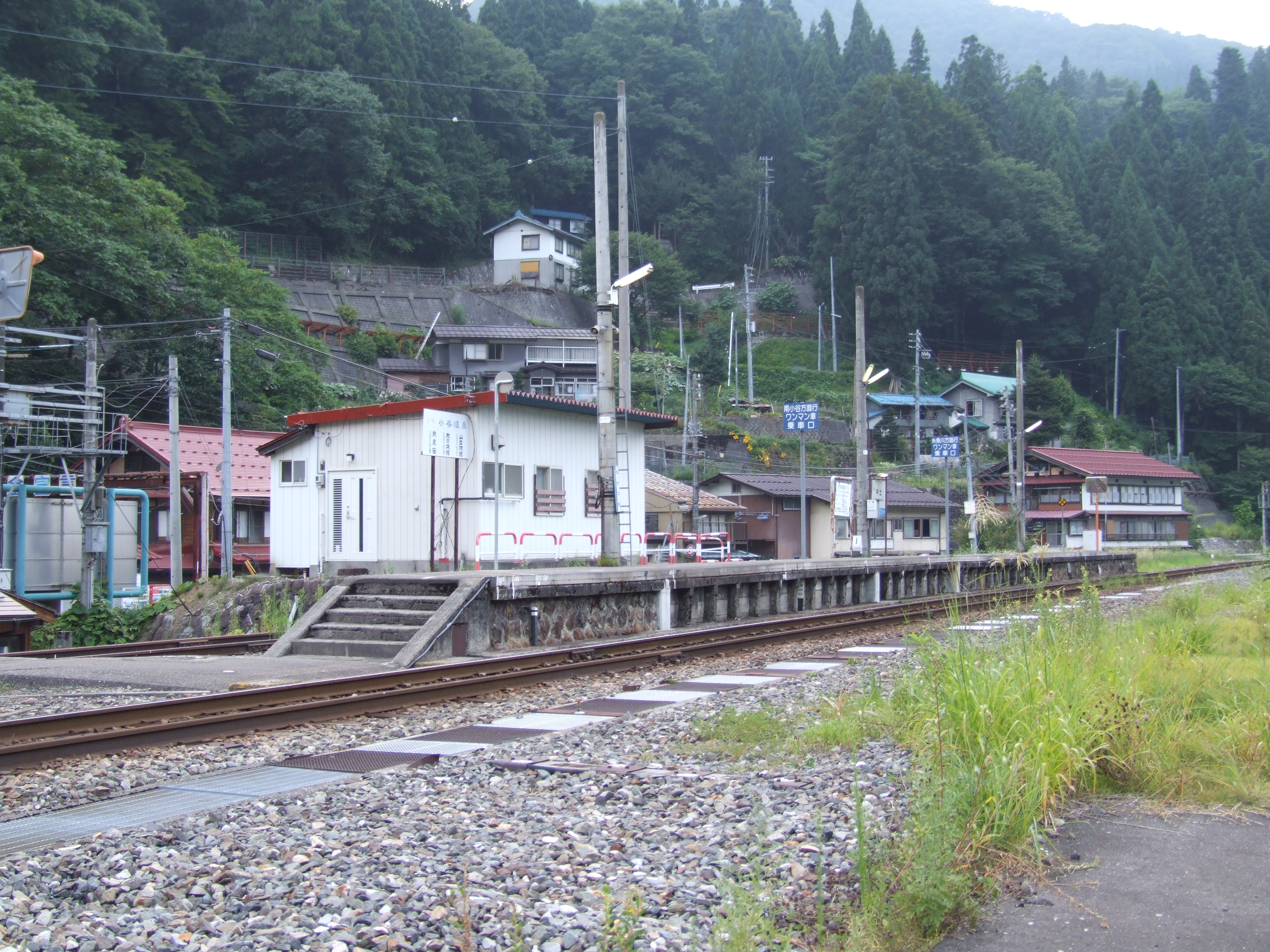
- Nakatsuchi Station, August 2008

General information
- Location: 7466 Ikeharashita, Naka-Otari, Otari-mura, Kitaazumi-gun, Nagano-ken 399-9421; Japan
- Elevation: 463.7 m (1,521 ft)
- Operator: JR West
- Line: ■ Ōito Line
- Platforms: 1 side platform

Other information
- Website: Official website

History
- Opened: 29 November 1935; 90 years ago

Services
Preceding station	JR West	Following station
Kita-Otari towards Itoigawa	Ōito Line	Minami-Otari Terminus
Location
- Location within Japan

Nakatsuchi Station (中土駅, Nakatsuchi-eki) is a railway station in Otari, Kitaazumi District, Nagano Prefecture, Japan, operated by West Japan Railway Company (JR West).

== Lines ==
Nakatsuchi Station is served by the Ōito Line and is 4.0 kilometers from the intermediate terminus of the line at Minami-Otari Station, and is 74.1 kilometers from the terminus of the line at Matsumoto Station.

== Station layout ==
The station consists of one ground-level side platform serving a single bi-directional track. The station is unattended.

== History ==
Nakatsuchi Station opened on 29 November 1935. With the privatization of Japanese National Railways (JNR) on 1 April 1987, the station came under the control of JR West.

== Surrounding area ==
- Otari Onsen

== See also ==
- List of railway stations in Japan
