= Ariake Station =

Ariake Station (有明駅) is the name of two train stations in Japan:

- Ariake Station (Nagano)
- Ariake Station (Tokyo)
