= Toyoshina Station =

Railway station in Azumino, Nagano Prefecture, Japan

Ōito Line34 Toyoshina Station 豊科駅
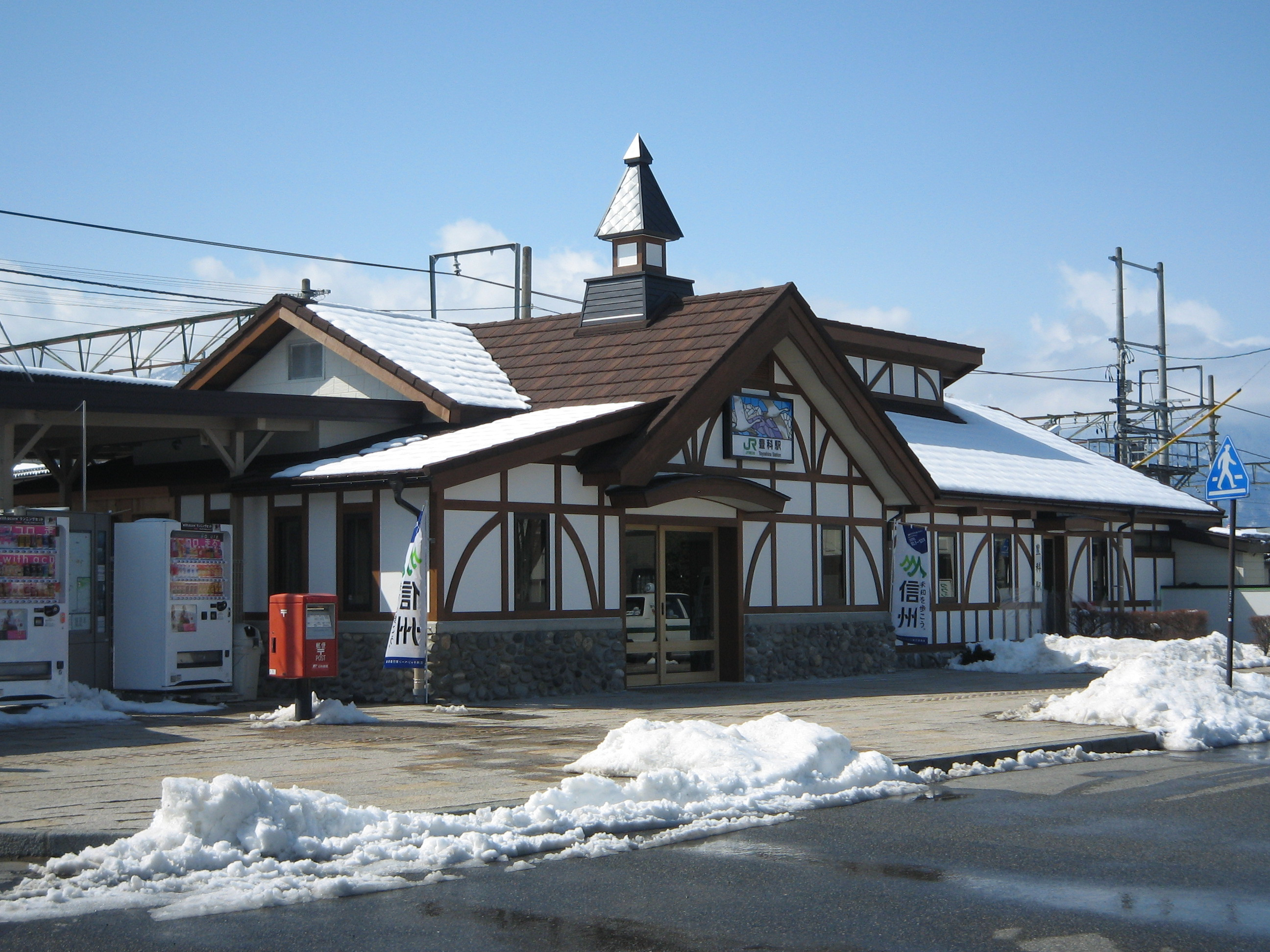
- Toyoshina Station, March 2010

General information
- Location: 4911-3 Toyoshina, Azumino-shi, Nagano-ken 399-8205; Japan
- Coordinates: 36°18′0.78″N 137°54′3.49″E
- Elevation: 552.7 meters
- Operator: JR East
- Line: ■ Ōito Line
- Distance: 11.4 km from Matsumoto
- Platforms: 1 island platform

Other information
- Status: Staffed (Midori no Madoguchi)
- Station code: 34
- Website: Official website

History
- Opened: 6 January 1915; 111 years ago

Passengers
- FY2015: 940

Services
| Preceding station | JR East | Following station |
|---|---|---|
| Hotaka 32 towards Hakuba | Azusa | Matsumoto 42 towards Chiba or Tokyo |
| Hakuyachō One-way operation | Ōito Line Rapid | Minami-Toyoshina 35 towards Matsumoto |
| Hakuyachō 33 towards Minami-Otari | Ōito Line Local | Minami-Toyoshina 35 towards Matsumoto |
Location
- Location within Nagano Prefecture Location within Japan

Toyoshina Station (豊科駅, Toyoshina-eki) is a railway station in the city of Azumino, Nagano Prefecture, Japan, operated by East Japan Railway Company (JR East).

== Lines ==
Toyoshina Station is served by the Ōito Line and is 11.4 kilometers from the terminus of the line at Matsumoto Station.

== Station layout ==
The station consists of one ground-level island platform serving a two tracks, connected to the station building by an underground passage. The station has a Midori no Madoguchi staffed ticket office.

=== Platforms ===
| 1 | ■ Ōito Line | for Matsumoto |
| 2 | ■ Ōito Line | for Shinano-Ōmachi, Hakuba and Minami-Otari |

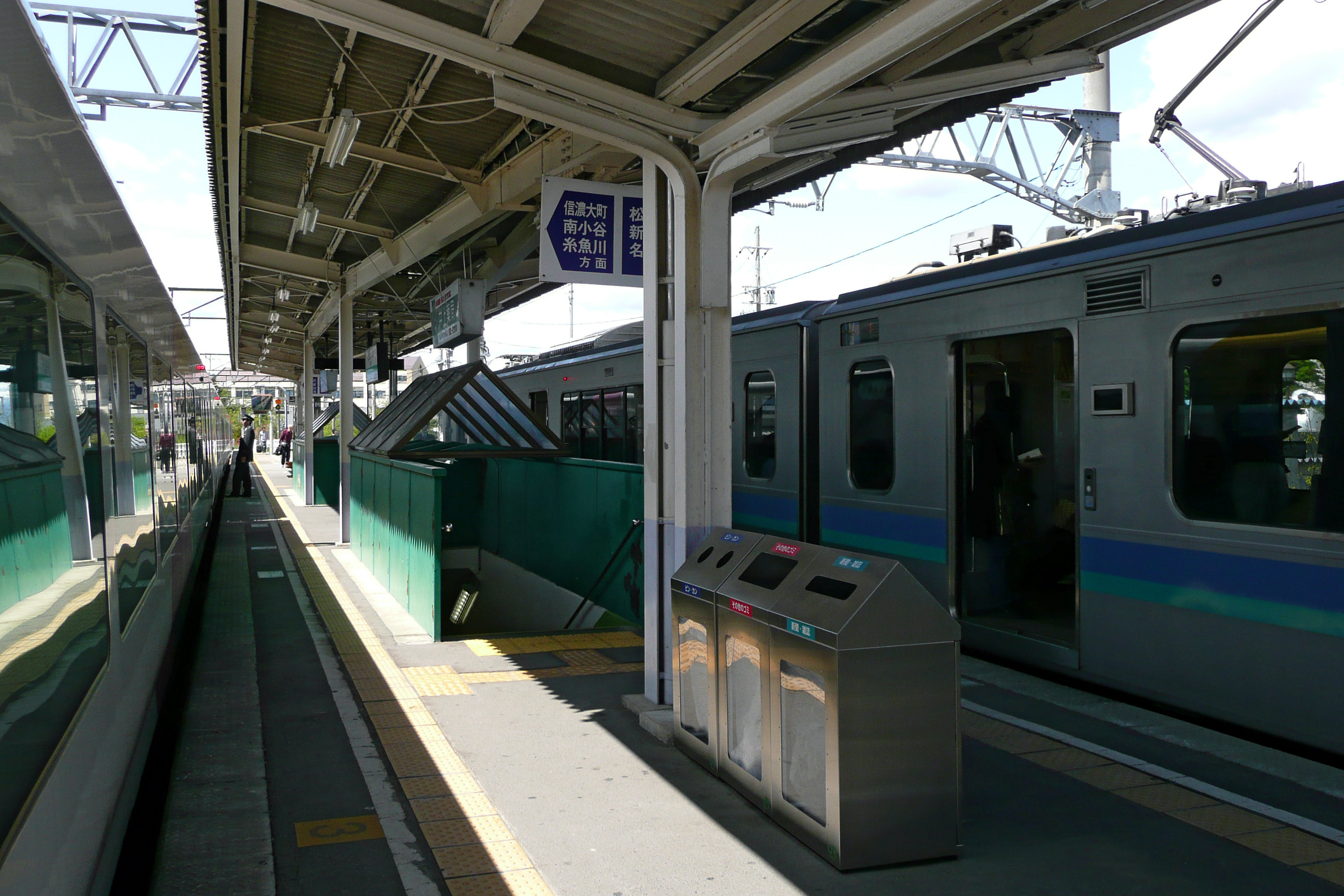
Toyoshina platform, May 2008

== History ==
Toyoshina Station opened on 6 January 1915. With the privatization of Japanese National Railways (JNR) on 1 April 1987, the station came under the control of JR East. The station building was remodelled in 2007.

== Passenger statistics ==
In fiscal 2015, the station was used by an average of 940 passengers daily (boarding passengers only).

== Surrounding area ==
- former Toyoshina Town Hall
- National Route 147

== See also ==
- List of railway stations in Japan
