= Azusa (train) =

Train service in Japan

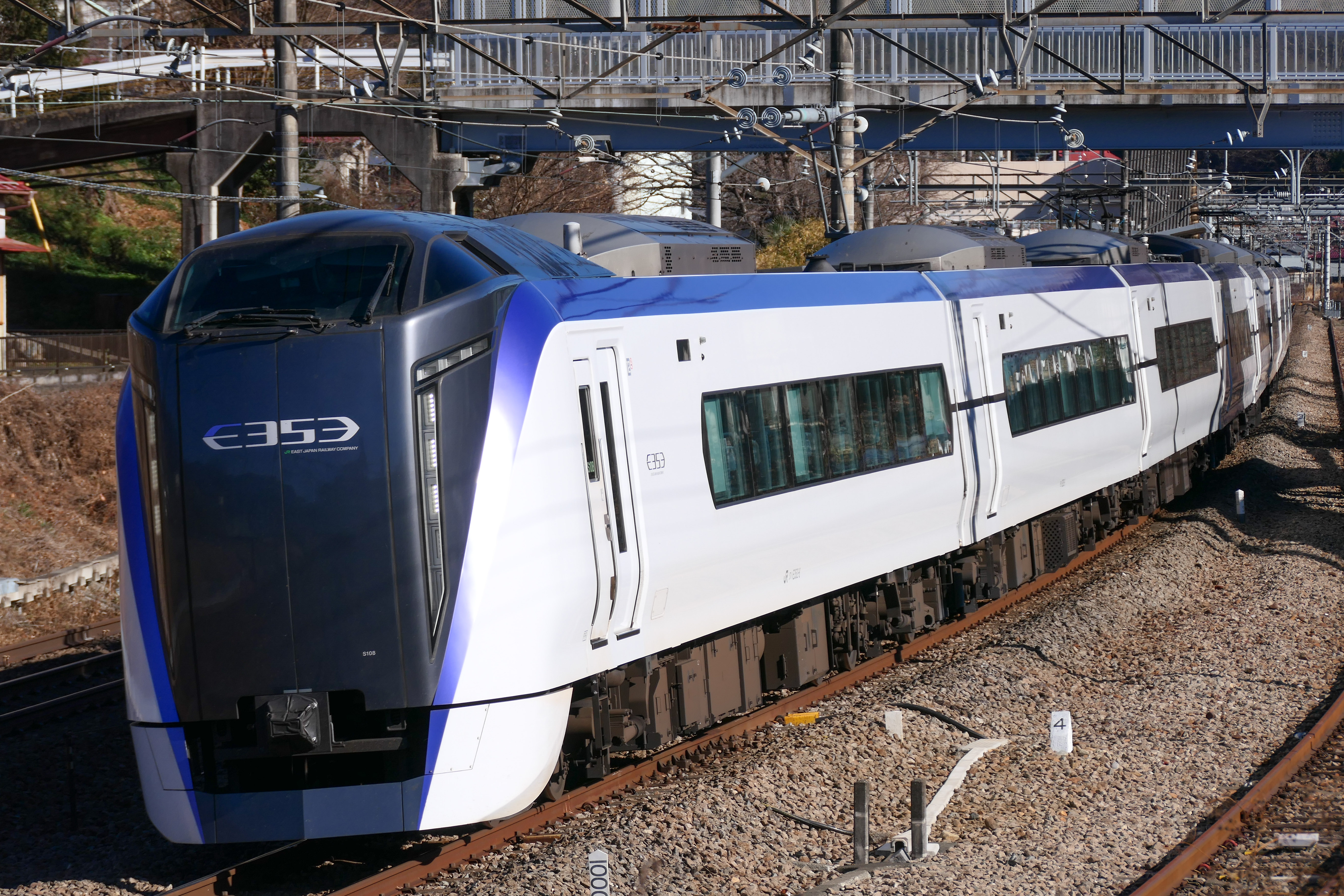
- E353 series EMU on an Azusa service in December 2020

Overview
- Service type: Limited express
- Status: Operational
- Locale: Chiba Prefecture / Tokyo / Kanagawa Prefecture, Yamanashi Prefecture / Nagano Prefecture, Japan
- First service: 1 October 1957; 68 years ago (Semi express); 12 December 1966; 59 years ago (Limited express)
- Last service: 15 March 2019; 7 years ago (Super Azusa), ongoing (Azusa)
- Current operator: JR East
- Former operator: JNR

Route
- Lines used: Chūō Main Line, Shinonoi Line, Sōbu Main Line, and Ōito Line

On-board services
- Class: Green + Ordinary
- Catering facilities: Trolley service

Technical
- Rolling stock: E353 series EMUs
- Track gauge: 1,067 mm (3 ft 6 in)
- Electrification: 1,500 V DC
- Operating speed: 130 km/h (80 mph)

The Azusa (Japanese: あずさ) is a limited express service operated by the East Japan Railway Company (JR East), which mainly run between Shinjuku and Matsumoto via the Chūō Main Line and Shinonoi Line. The name Azusa is taken from the Azusa River in Matsumoto, Nagano. On the Chūō Main Line, limited express Kaiji also runs between Tokyo / Shinjuku, and Kōfu / Ryūō.

The name Super Azusa (Japanese: スーパーあずさ) was used for services operated with tilting rolling stock, namely the E351 series, and the E353 series (prior to 16 March 2019).

== Service pattern and stops ==
As of March 2025, 16 round trips are operated every day. All trains run on the Chūō Main Line and Shinonoi Line, with few of them also running on the Sōbu Main Line and Ōito Line. Prior to March 2025, the trip currently terminating at Hakuba instead traveled four stations further to Minami-Otari.

Section	Train number	
Section	Eastbound (Up)	Westbound (Down)
Shinjuku - Matsumoto	18, 22, 26, 30, 34, 38, 42, 44, 54, 60	1, 9, 13, 17, 21, 25, 29, 33, 37
Tokyo - Shinjuku - Matsumoto	4, 8, 12, 16	41, 45, 49, 53, 55
Shinjuku - Matsumoto - Hakuba	46	5
Chiba - Shinjuku - Matsumoto	50	3

=== Stops ===
- No brackets denote stations at which most or all Azusa services stop.
- Parentheses () denote stations at which some Azusa services stop.
- Square brackets【】denote stations at which very few Azusa services stop.

【Chiba - Funabashi - Kinshichō / Tokyo】- Shinjuku - Tachikawa - Hachiōji -【Ōtsuki - Enzan - Yamanashishi - Isawa-Onsen】- Kōfu - (Nirasaki) - Kobuchizawa -【Fujimi】- Chino - Kami-Suwa -【Shimo-Suwa】- Okaya - Shiojiri - Matsumoto -【Toyoshina - Hotaka - Shinano-Ōmachi - Hakuba】

== Ticketing ==
A limited express ticket has to be purchased to board an Azusa train, along with the basic fare ticket. There are two types of such limited express tickets, namely the Reserved Seat Ticket (座席指定券, Zaseki shitei ken), and the Unreserved Seat Ticket (座席未指定券, Zaseki mishitei ken).

The Reserved Seat Ticket enables a specified seat to be reserved for the holder. The reserved status for the seat is signified by a green overhead lamp on top of the corresponding seat.

The Unreserved Seat Ticket enables the holder to be seated on any unreserved seat. A red overhead lamp signifies that the seat is unreserved; while a yellow overhead lamp signifies that the seat is reserved for the later part of the journey, implying that one has to give up their seat to the passenger who has reserved the seat and change to another vacant seat, when they board the train later.

== Extra services ==
=== Kiso Azusa ===
The Kiso Azusa (木曾あずさ) was an extra limited express service that was operated in 2017 and 2018, as a part of the Shinshū Destination Campaign (信州デスティネーションキャンペーン) to boost tourism to Nagano Prefecture (Shinshū is an old name for the region). The extra train operated on the Chūō Main Line between Shinjuku to Nagiso, via Tatsuno. With consideration that tourists would be staying the night around the area, the inbound train to Shinjuku was operated the day after the outbound train to Nagiso has arrived.

In 2018, the train operated 2 round trips during the campaign duration.

==== Stops ====
Shinjuku - Tachikawa - Hachiōji - Kōfu - Chino - Kami-Suwa - Okaya - Tatsuno - Shiojiri - Narai - Kiso-Fukushima - Nagiso

==== Rolling stock ====
- 189 series 6-car EMUs (Ordinary class, reserved seats only)

== Rolling stock ==
- E353 series EMUs (since 23 December 2017)
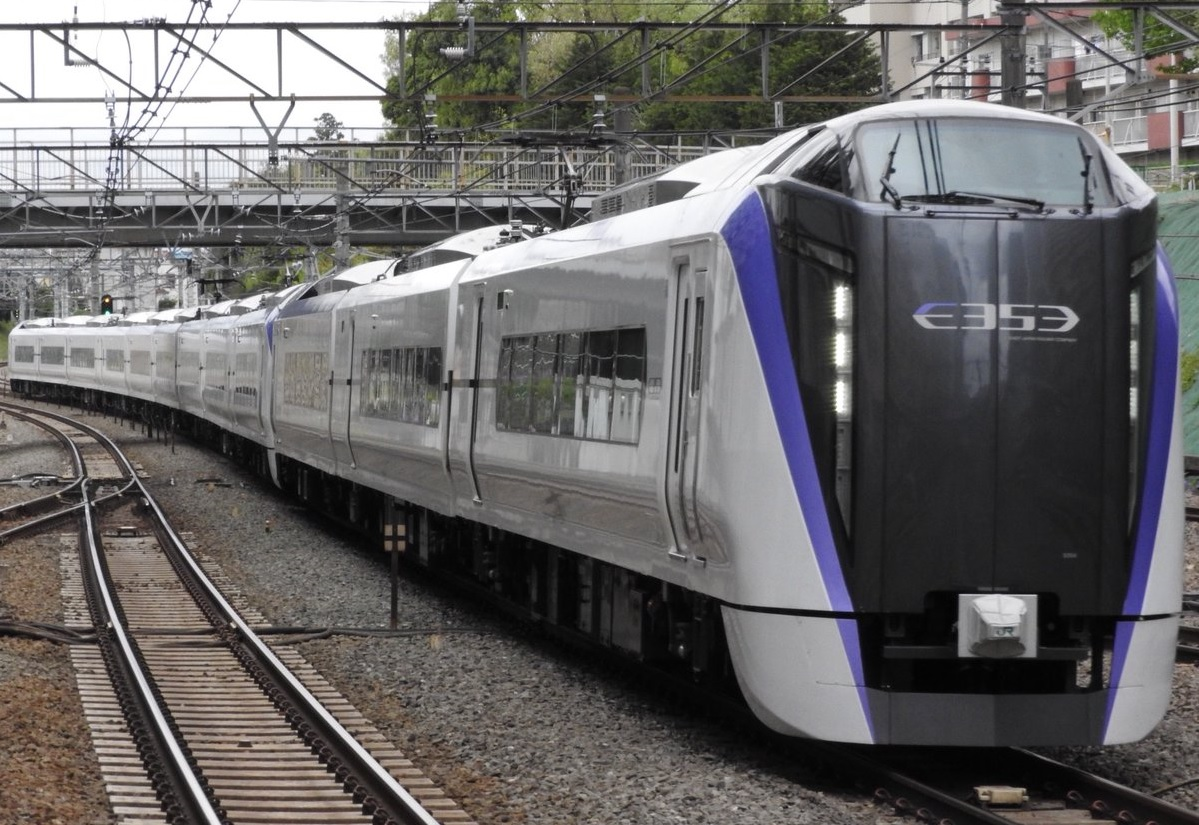
An E353 series train in April 2018

From 23 December 2017, new E353 series EMUs were introduced on Super Azusa services. By March 2018, all Super Azusa services were replaced by E353 series trains, and the E257 series trainsets used on Azusa services by 16 March 2019. Following the unification of all Super Azusa and Azusa services into E353 series, the name Super Azusa was abolished.

=== Rolling stock previously used ===
- 181 series 10-car EMUs (from 1966)
- 183 series EMUs (from 1972)
- 165 series EMUs (from 1966)
- E351 series EMUs (Super Azusa, from December 1993 to March 2018)
- E257 series EMUs (from December 2001 to 16 March 2019, still used on extra services)
- 189 series EMUs (from 1975)
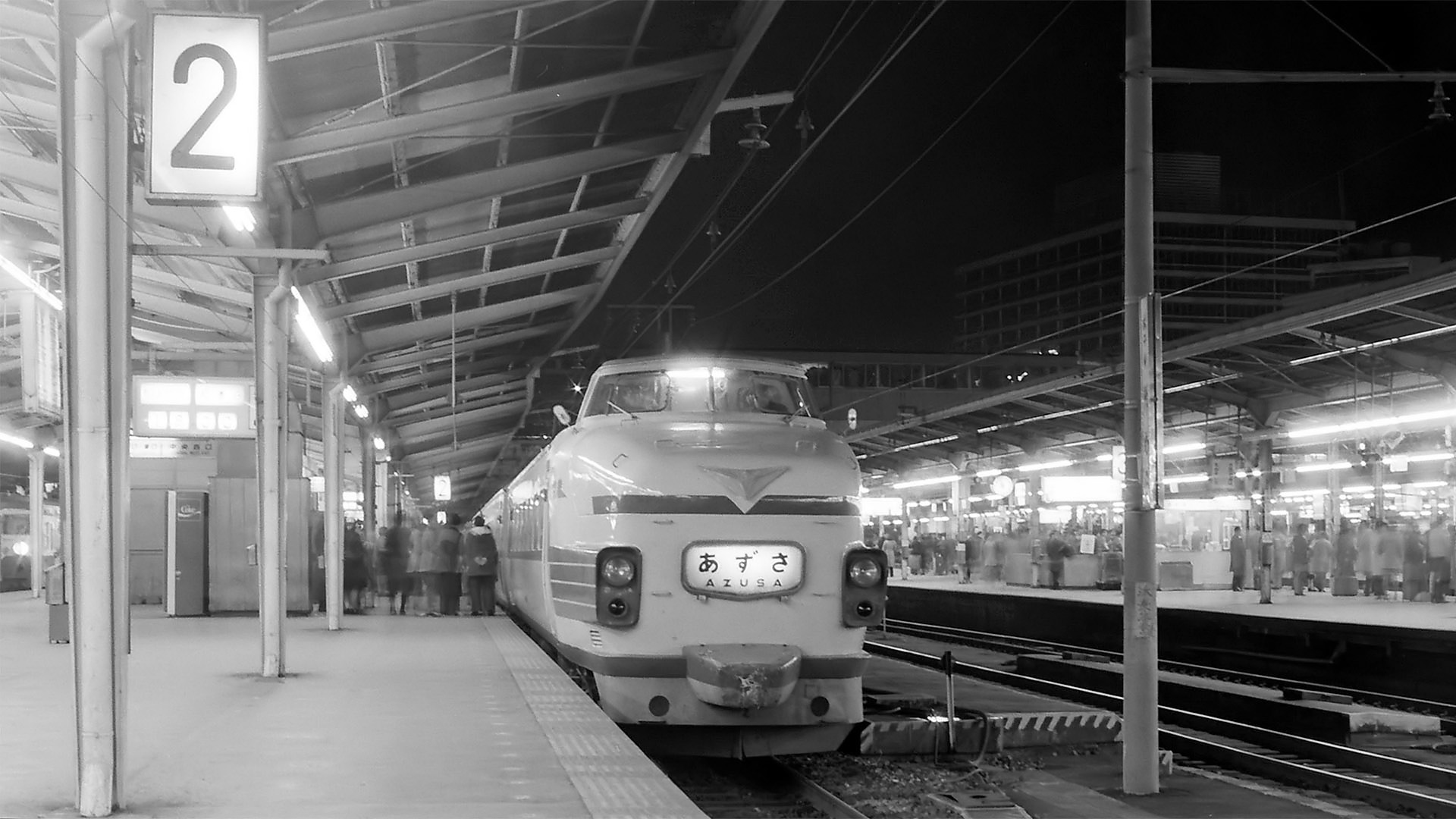
A 181 series EMU on an Azusa service in 1975

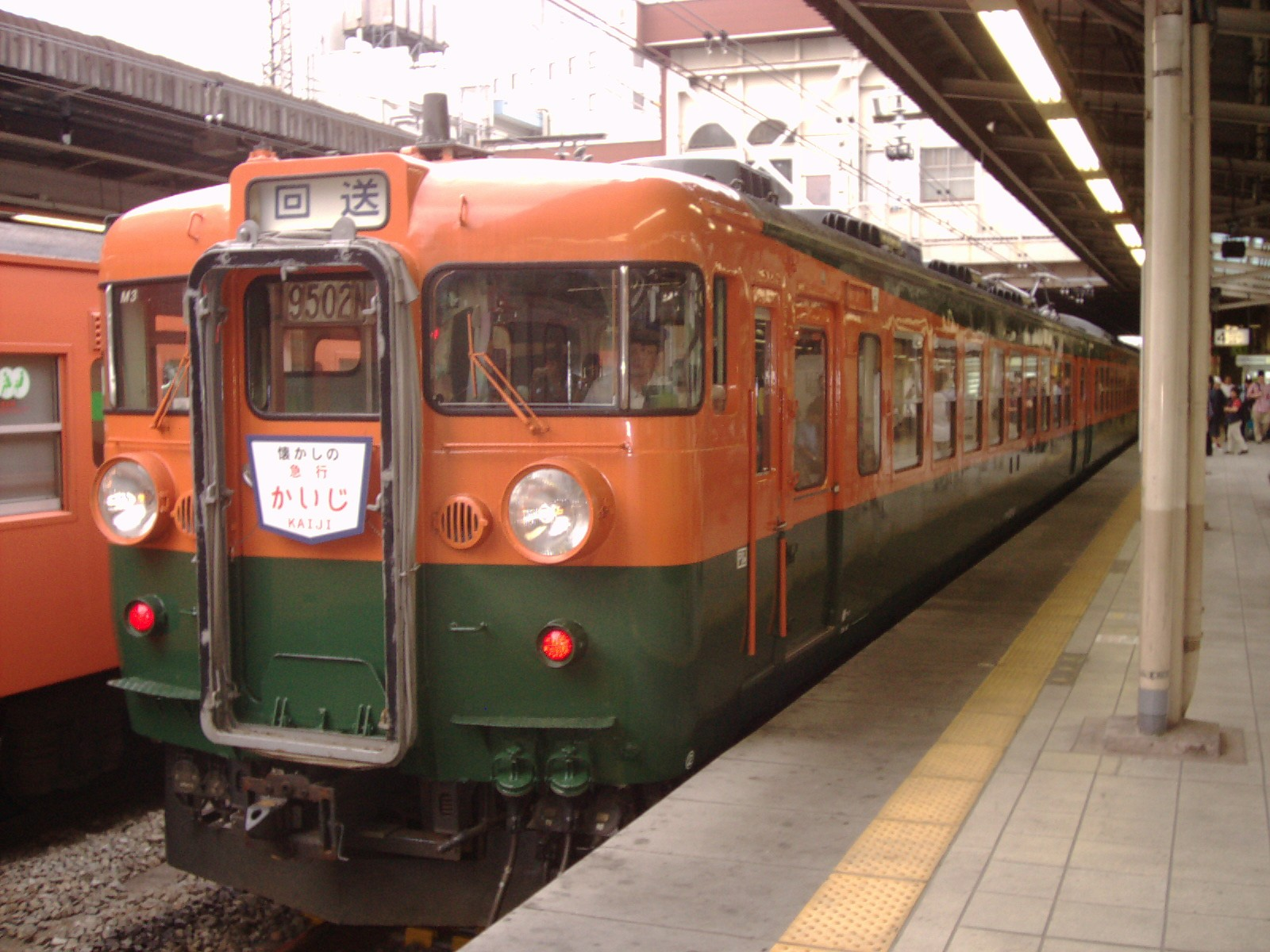
A 165 series EMU

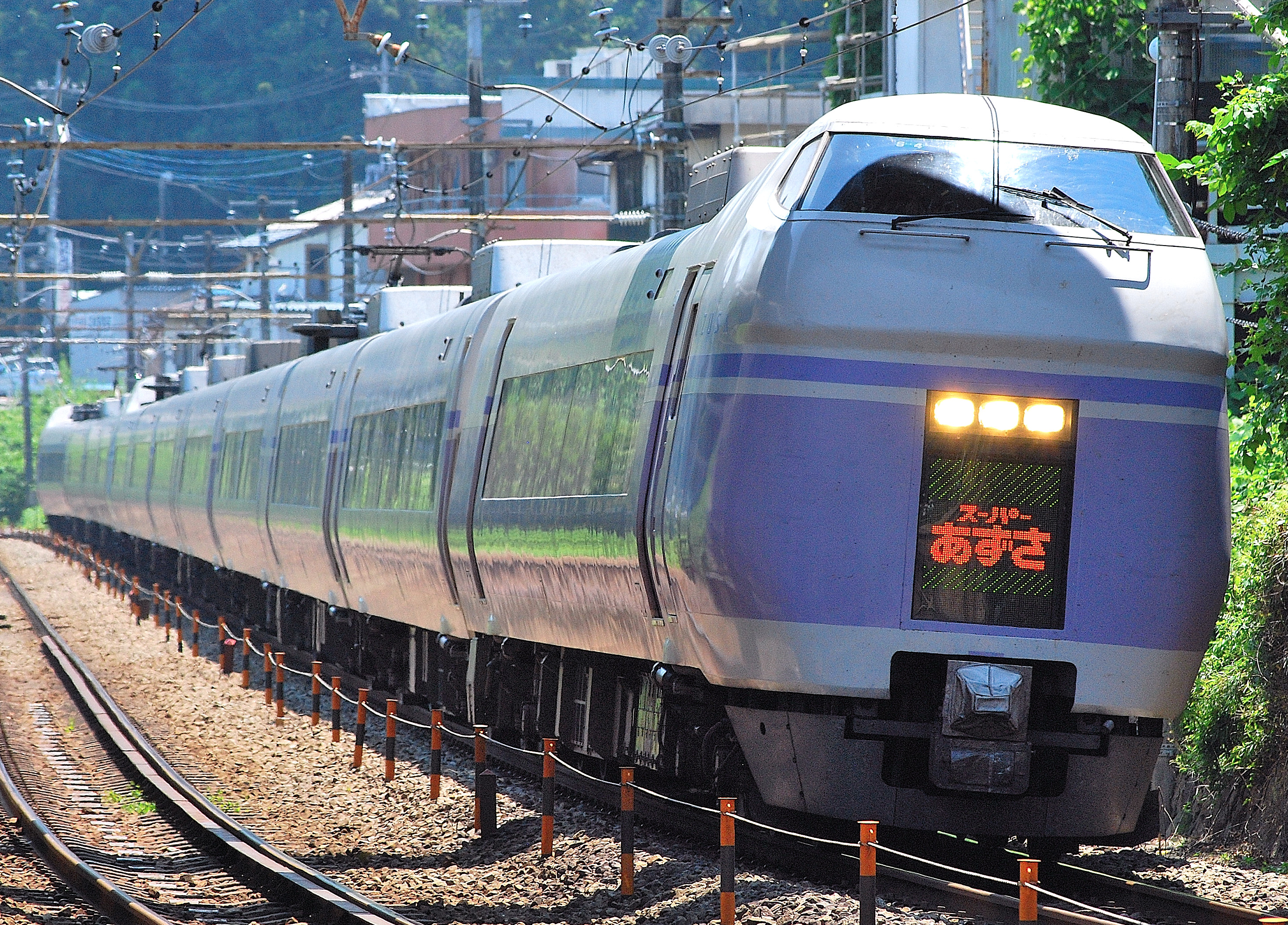
An E351 series EMU on a Super Azusa service in July 2010

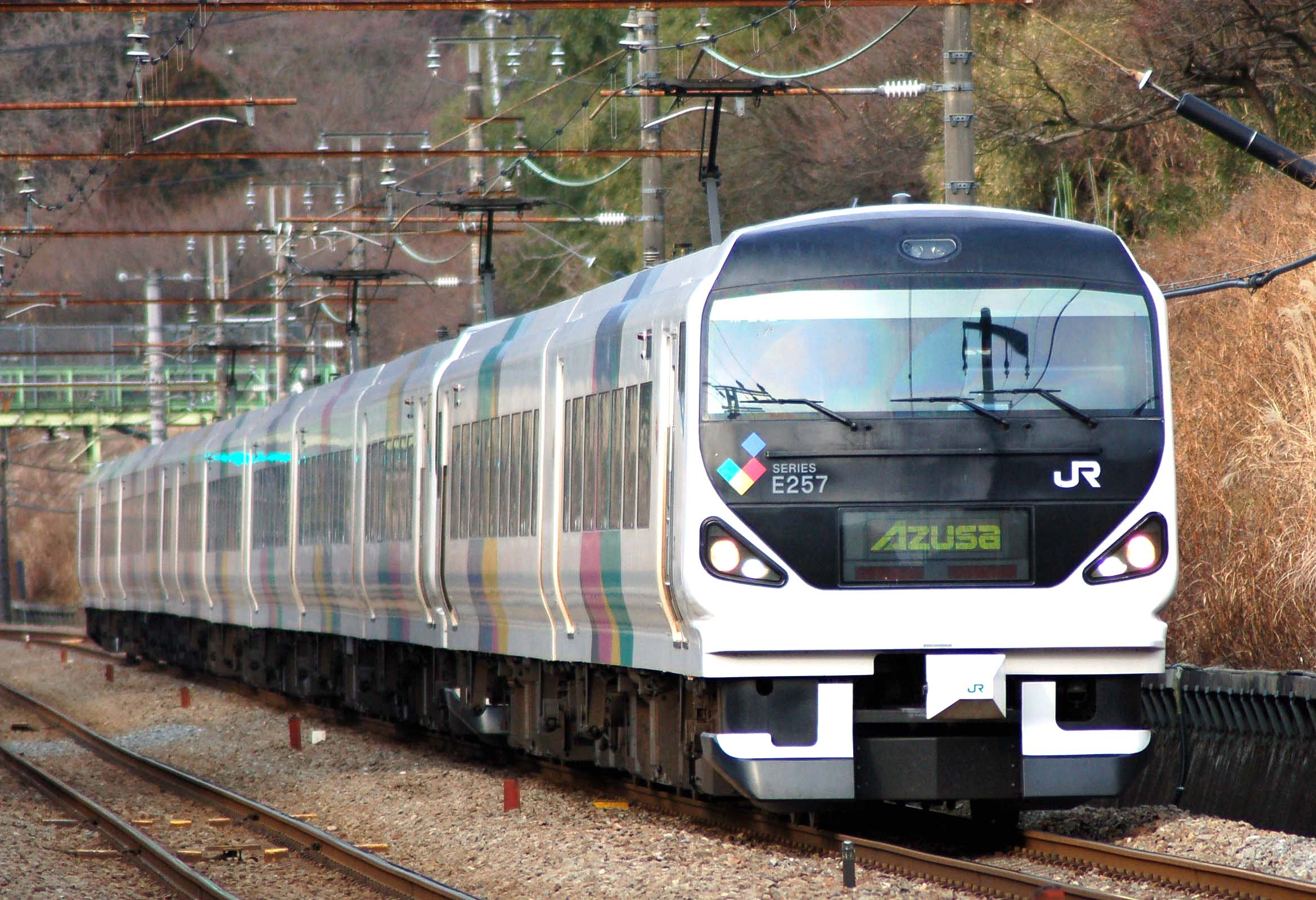
An E257 series EMU on an Azusa service in January 2008

== Formations ==
=== Current formation ===
==== Azusa (E353 series) ====
All Azusa services (E353 series) are formed of nine cars as shown below, numbered 4 to 12, with car 4 at the Shinjuku end.

Car No.	1	2	3	4	5	6	7	8	9	10	11	12
Numbering	KuMoHa E353-0	MoHa E353-1000	KuMoHa E352-0	KuHa E353-0	MoHa E353-500	MoHa E352-500	MoHa E353-2000	SaHa E353-0	SaRoHa E353-0	MoHa E353-0	MoHa E352-0	KuHa E352-0
Accommodation	Reserved	Reserved	Reserved	Reserved	Reserved	Reserved	Reserved	Reserved	Green	Reserved	Reserved	Reserved
Facilities	Toilet	Toilet		Toilet		Toilet		Toilet	Toilet		Toilet	

=== Past formations ===
==== Azusa (E257 series) ====
Azusa services (E257 series) were formed of 2+9-car or 9-car sets as shown below, with car 1 at the southern (Chiba/Tokyo/Shinjuku) end. All cars were no-smoking.

Car No.	1	2	3	4	5	6	7	8		9	10	11
Numbering	KuHa E257	KuMoHa E257	KuHa E257	MoHa E257	MoHa E256	MoHa E257	SaHa E257	SaRoHa E257		MoHa E257	MoHa E256	KuHa E256
Accommodation	Reserved	Reserved	Non-reserved	Non-reserved	Non-reserved	Reserved	Reserved	Reserved	Green	Reserved	Reserved	Reserved

==== Super Azusa (E353 series) ====
From March 2018 to March 2019, Super Azusa services were formed of 3+9-car E353 series trainsets as shown below, with car 1 at the southern (Tokyo/Shinjuku) end. All cars were no-smoking. There were days when car 3 operates as a reserved seating car.

Car No.	1	2	3	4	5	6	7	8	9	10	11	12
Numbering	KuMoHa E353-0	MoHa E353-1000	KuMoHa E352-0	KuHa E353-0	MoHa E353-500	MoHa E352-500	MoHa E353-2000	SaHa E353-0	SaRoHa E353-0	MoHa E353-0	MoHa E352-0	KuHa E352-0
Accommodation	Reserved	Reserved	Non-reserved	Non-reserved	Non-reserved	Non-reserved	Non-reserved	Reserved	Green	Reserved	Reserved	Reserved
Facilities	Toilet	Toilet		Toilet		Toilet		Toilet	Toilet		Toilet	

== History ==
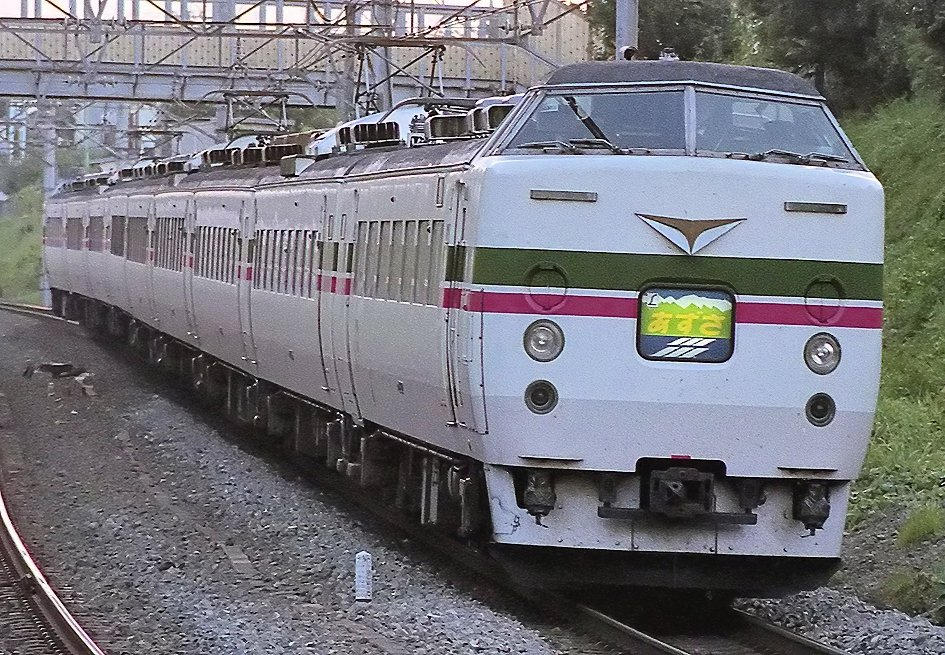
A 183 series EMU in original "Grade-up Azusa" livery

The Azusa service began on 1 October 1957 as a semi express operating between Shinjuku and Matsumoto. This operated until 24 April 1960 when it was absorbed into Hakuba semi express services.

The Azusa name was revived from 12 December 1966 for use on limited express services operating between Shinjuku and Matsumoto.

The premier Super Azusa service commenced on 3 December 1994 with the delivery of the first new E351 series tilting EMUs.

New E257 series EMUs were introduced on Azusa services from the start of the revised timetable on 1 December 2001.

Smoking was prohibited in all cars from 18 March 2007.

From 16 March 2019 onwards, with the replacement of E257 series trains to E353 series trains on all Azusa services, the name Super Azusa were discontinued and were integrated with Azusa services.

== See also ==
- List of named passenger trains of Japan
- Kaiji, another limited express service operated on the Chūō Line
