= Ōito Line =

Railway line in Nagano and Niigata Prefecture, Japan

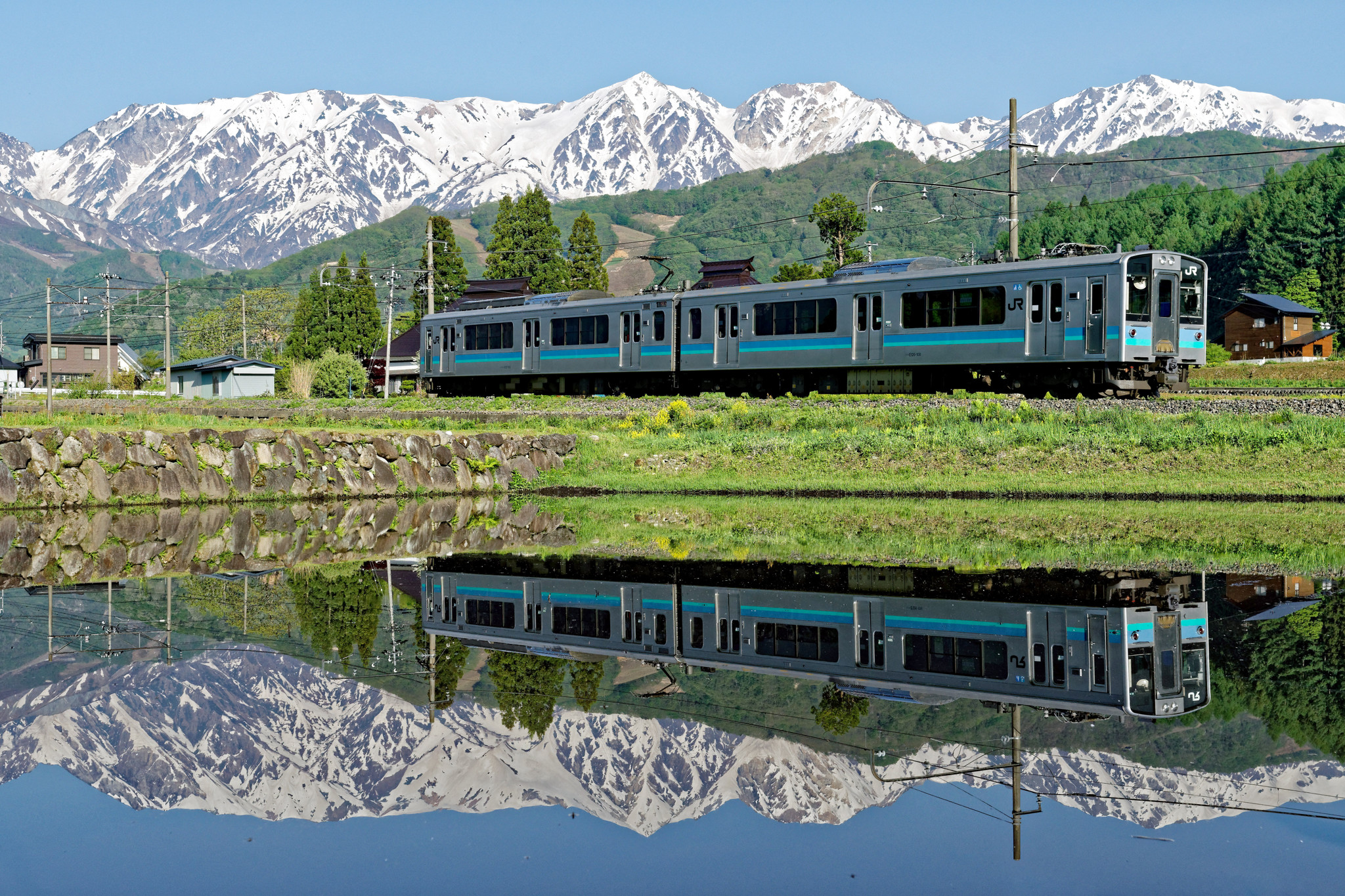
- A JR East E127 series EMU on the Oito Line in Hakuba, Nagano Prefecture

Overview
- Native name: 大糸線
- Status: In operation
- Owner: JR East, JR West
- Locale: Nagano, Niigata Prefectures
- Termini: Matsumoto; Itoigawa
- Stations: 41

Service
- Type: Heavy rail
- Operator(s): JR East, JR West
- Rolling stock: E127 series EMU, 211 series EMU, E353 series EMU, KiHa 120 series DMU

History
- Opened: January 6, 1915; 111 years ago

Technical
- Line length: 105.4 km (65.5 mi)
- Num of tracks: Entire line single tracked
- Character: Rural and scenic
- Track gauge: 1,067 mm (3 ft 6 in)
- Electrification: 1,500 V DC (Matsumoto - Minami-Otari); None (Minami-Otari - Itoigawa)
- Operating speed: 95 km/h (59 mph)
Route map

The Ōito Line (大糸線, Ōito-sen) is a railway line in Japan which connects Matsumoto Station in Nagano Prefecture with Itoigawa Station in Niigata Prefecture. There are two operators on the line: East Japan Railway Company (JR East) and West Japan Railway Company (JR West). Minami-Otari is the boundary between the two companies. The section of the line operated by JR East, between Minami-Otari and Matsumoto, is electrified and has a regular service. The JR West section from Minami-Otari to Itoigawa is not electrified, sees less use, and has less frequent services.

== Route data ==
- Operators, services:
  - East Japan Railway Company (Services and tracks)
    - Matsumoto — Minami-Otari: 70.1 km
  - West Japan Railway Company (Services and tracks)
    - Minami-Otari — Itoigawa: 35.3 km
- Stations:
  - JR East: 33
  - JR West: 8 including Itoigawa, excluding Minami-Otari
- Double-tracked section: None
- Electrification: Matsumoto — Minami-Otari (1,500 V DC)
  Minami-Otari — Itoigawa (None)
- Railway signalling:
  - Matsumoto — Itoigawa: Automatic Train Stop, S-type

== Services ==
=== JR East section ===
Limited express, Rapid

As of March 2025, the following services are operated.

Name	Through from/to	Start	End	Service frequency (daily)
Limited Express Azusa	Shinjuku	Matsumoto	Hakuba	1 return trip
Rapid	Kami-Suwa	Matsumoto	Shinano-Ōmachi	1 up trip
Rapid	-	Shinano-Ōmachi	Minami-Otari	1 up trip

Local
Matsumoto – Shinano-Ōmachi: every 30-60 minutes
Shinano-Ōmachi – Minami-Otari: every 60-180 minutes

=== JR West section ===
Local
Minami-Otari - Itoigawa: every 120-180 minutes

No limited-stop services such as rapids operate on the JR West section. All trains are local services, which stop at every station.

== Rolling stock ==
=== JR East section ===
- E127-100 series EMU
- 211 series EMU
- E353 series EMU - Azusa

=== JR West section ===
- KiHa 120 series DMU

== Stations ==
=== JR East section ===
All stations are within Nagano Prefecture.

A: Limited Express Azusa
R: Rapid
Trains stop at stations marked "O", skip at stations marked "|".

No.	Station	Japanese	Distance(km)		A	R	Transfers	Location
No.	Station	Japanese	Between stations	Total	A	R	Transfers	Location
42	Matsumoto	松本	-	0.0	O	O	Shinonoi Line; ■ Alpico Kōtsū Kamikōchi Line	Matsumoto
41	Kita-Matsumoto	北松本	0.7	0.7	|	O		Matsumoto
40	Shimauchi	島内	1.9	2.6	|	O		Matsumoto
39	Shimatakamatsu	島高松	1.2	3.8	|	O		Matsumoto
38	Azusabashi	梓橋	1.4	5.2	|	O		Azumino
37	Hitoichiba	一日市場	1.6	6.8	|	O		Azumino
36	Nakagaya	中萱	1.6	8.4	|	O		Azumino
35	Minami-Toyoshina	南豊科	2.0	10.4	|	O		Azumino
34	Toyoshina	豊科	1.0	11.4	O	O		Azumino
33	Hakuyachō	柏矢町	2.8	14.2	|	O		Azumino
32	Hotaka	穂高	2.0	16.2	O	O		Azumino
31	Ariake	有明	2.2	18.4	|	O		Azumino
30	Azumi-Oiwake	安曇追分	1.5	19.9	|	O		Azumino
29	Hosono	細野	2.9	22.8	|	↑		Matsukawa, Kitaazumi District
28	Kita-Hosono	北細野	1.0	23.8	|	↑		Matsukawa, Kitaazumi District
27	Shinano-Matsukawa	信濃松川	2.2	26.0	|	O		Matsukawa, Kitaazumi District
26	Azumi-Kutsukake	安曇沓掛	1.6	28.6	|	↑		Ōmachi
25	Shinano-Tokiwa	信濃常盤	2.3	30.9	|	O		Ōmachi
24	Minami-Ōmachi	南大町	3.1	34.0	|	↑		Ōmachi
23	Shinano-Ōmachi	信濃大町	1.1	35.1	O	O		Ōmachi
23	Shinano-Ōmachi	信濃大町	1.1	35.1	O	O	Rapid terminus / transfer	Ōmachi
22	Kita-Ōmachi	北大町	2.1	37.2	|	↑		Ōmachi
21	Shinano-Kizaki	信濃木崎	2.2	39.4	|	O		Ōmachi
20	Inao	稲尾	2.2	41.6	|	↑		Ōmachi
19	Uminokuchi	海ノ口	1.3	42.9	|	↑		Ōmachi
18	Yanaba	簗場	3.4	46.3	|	O		Ōmachi
16	Minami-Kamishiro	南神城	4.9	52.8	|	↑		Hakuba, Kitaazumi District
15	Kamishiro	神城	2.4	55.2	|	O		Hakuba, Kitaazumi District
14	Iimori	飯森	1.5	56.7	|	↑		Hakuba, Kitaazumi District
13	Hakuba	白馬	3.0	59.7	O	O		Hakuba, Kitaazumi District
12	Shinano-Moriue	信濃森上	1.9	61.6		O		Hakuba, Kitaazumi District
11	Hakuba-Ōike	白馬大池	3.8	65.4		↑		Otari, Kitaazumi District
10	Chikuni	千国	3.4	68.7		↑		Otari, Kitaazumi District
9	Minami-Otari	南小谷	1.4	70.1		O		Otari, Kitaazumi District

Closed Stations Yanabaskijōmae Station closed on 16 March 2019

=== JR West section ===
Station	Japanese	Distance(km)		Transfers	Location
Station	Japanese	Between stations	Total	Transfers	Location
Minami-Otari	南小谷	-	70.1		Otari, Nagano
Nakatsuchi	中土	4.0	74.1		Otari, Nagano
Kita-Otari	北小谷	4.4	78.5		Otari, Nagano
Hiraiwa	平岩	5.5	85.0		Itoigawa, Niigata
Kotaki	小滝	6.8	91.8		Itoigawa, Niigata
Nechi	根知	3.6	95.4		Itoigawa, Niigata
Kubiki-Ōno	頸城大野	4.9	100.3		Itoigawa, Niigata
Himekawa	姫川	1.9	102.2		Itoigawa, Niigata
Itoigawa	糸魚川	3.2	105.4	Hokuriku Shinkansen; ETR Nihonkai Hisui Line	Itoigawa, Niigata

== History ==
The section between Matsumoto and Shinano-Ōmachi was built between 1915 and 1916 by the Shinano Railway (信濃鉄道, Shinano Tetsudō), which electrified the line in 1926. The company was nationalised in 1937 and was not the same entity as the present Shinano Railway.

The rest of the line was built by the Japanese Government Railways (JGR) and the Japanese National Railways (JNR) between 1929 and 1957. The Shinano-Ōmachi to Minami Otari section was electrified between 1959 and 1967. CTC signalling was commissioned in 1983, and freight services ceased in 1987.

Following privatization of JNR on 1 April 1987, the line was divided and assigned to JR East and JR West.

Station numbering was introduced on the line by JR East from 12 December 2016, with stations numbered in sequence from 9 (Minami-Otari) to 42 (Matsumoto).

== See also ==
- List of railway lines in Japan
