= Shinano-Ōmachi Station =

Railway station in Ōmachi, Nagano Prefecture, Japan

Ōito Line23 Shinano-Ōmachi Station 信濃大町駅
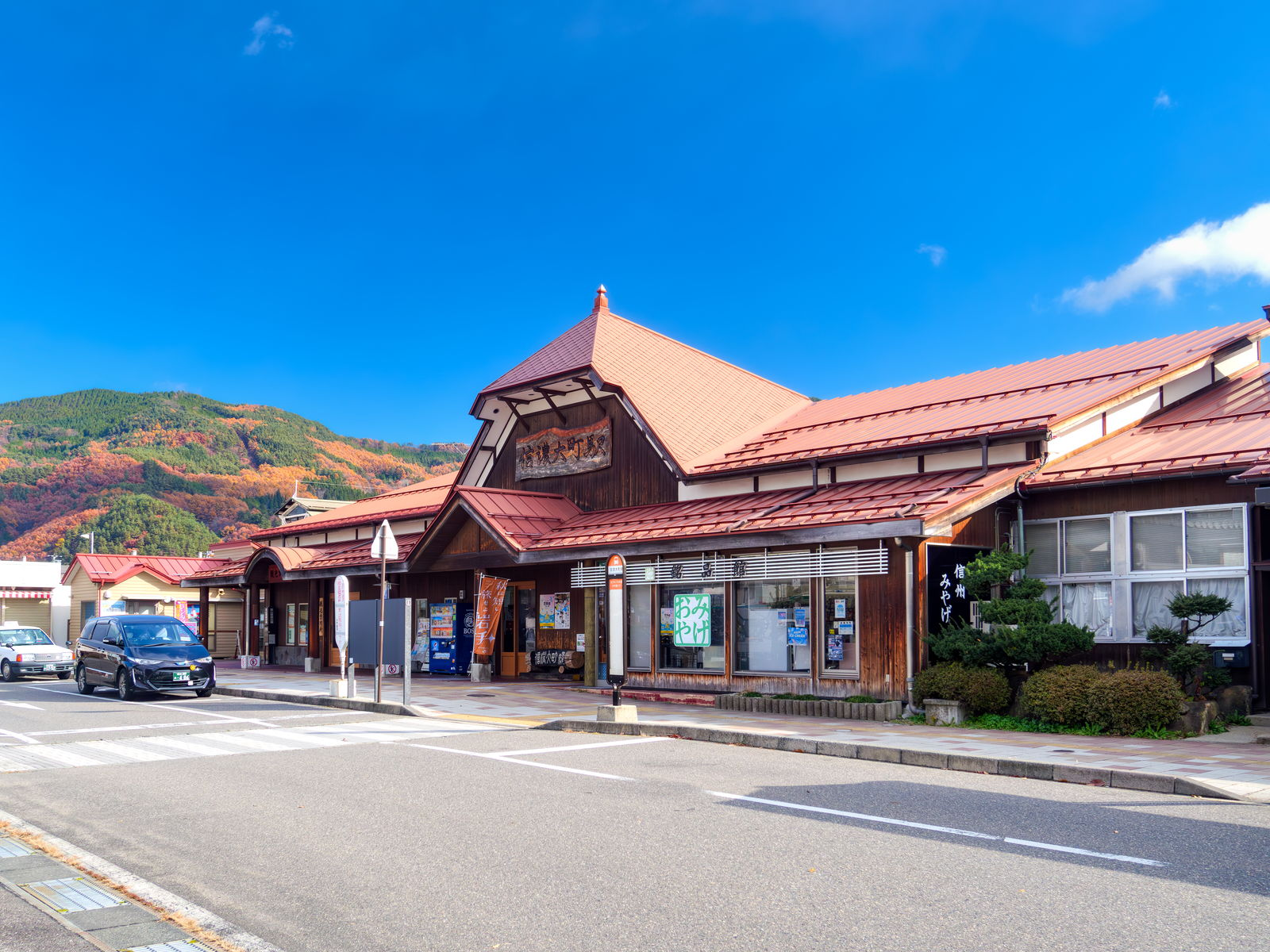
- Shinano-Ōmachi Station, November 2024

General information
- Location: 3200 Ōmachi, Ōmachishi, Nagano-ken 398-0002; Japan
- Coordinates: 36.5000032°N 137.8613645°E
- Elevation: 712.5 meters
- Operator: JR East
- Line: ■ Ōito Line
- Distance: 35.1 km from Matsumoto
- Platforms: 1 side + 1 island platform

Other information
- Status: Staffed
- Station code: 23
- Website: Official website

History
- Opened: 5 July 1916; 110 years ago

Passengers
- FY2015: 1332

Services
Preceding station	JR East	Following station
Hakuba 13 Terminus	Azusa	Hotaka 32 towards Chiba or Tokyo
Shinano-Kizaki One-way operation	Ōito Line Rapid	Terminus
Terminus	Ōito Line Rapid	Shinano-Tokiwa 25 towards Matsumoto
Kita-Ōmachi 22 towards Minami-Otari	Ōito Line Local	Minami-Ōmachi 24 towards Matsumoto
Location
- Location within Nagano Prefecture Location within Japan

Shinano-Ōmachi Station (信濃大町駅, Shinano-Ōmachi-eki) is a railway station in the city of Ōmachi, Nagano, Japan, operated by East Japan Railway Company (JR East). It is the starting point of the Tateyama Kurobe Alpine Route.

== Lines ==
Shinano-Ōmachi Station is served by the Ōito Line and is 35.1 kilometers from the terminus of the line at Matsumoto Station.

== Station layout ==
The station consists of one ground-level side platform and one island platform connected by a footbridge. the side platform is Platform 1 and is adjacent to the station building; the island platform has Platform 3 and Platform 4. There is no Platform 2. The station has a "Midori no Madoguchi" staffed ticket office.

=== Platforms ===
1	■ Ōito Line	for Hotaka, Toyoshina and Matsumoto for Hakuba, Minami-Otari and Itoigawa
3, 4	■ Ōito Line	for Hotaka, Toyoshina, Matsumoto for Hakuba, Minami-Otari and Itoigawa

== Bus terminal ==
=== Highway buses ===
- Chūō Kōsoku Bus; For Shinjuku Station
- For Nagano Station

=== Route buses ===
- For Ōgizawa Station

== Passenger statistics ==
In fiscal 2015, the station was used by an average of 1,443 passengers daily (boarding passengers only).

== History ==
Shinano-Ōmachi Station opened on 5 July 1916. With the privatization of Japanese National Railways (JNR) on 1 April 1987, the station came under the control of JR East.

== Surrounding area ==
- Omachi Post Office
- National Route 147
- Omachi Mountaineering Museum

== See also ==
- List of railway stations in Japan
