= Hakuba Station =

Railway station in Hakuba, Nagano Prefecture, Japan

Ōito Line13 Hakuba Station 白馬駅
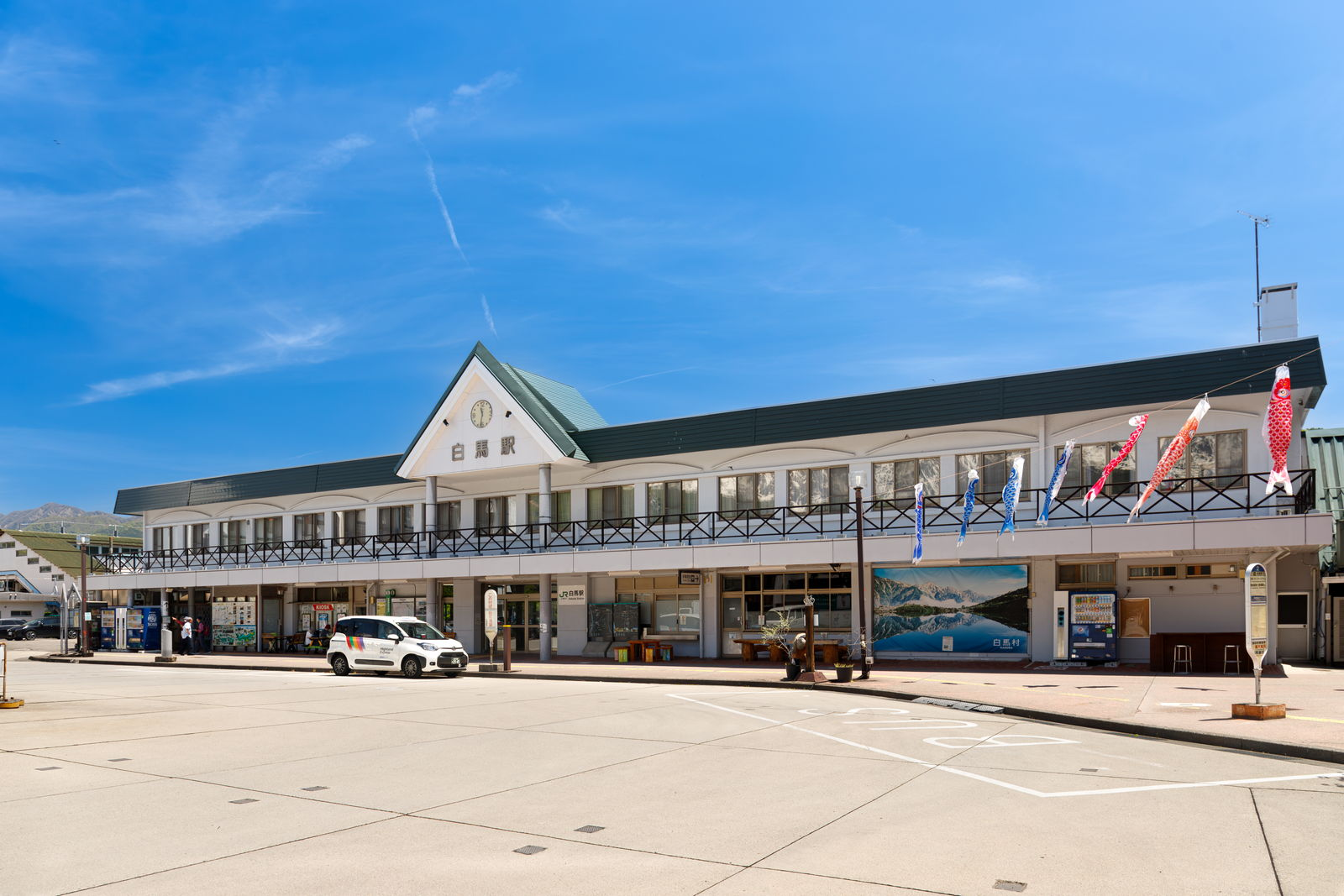
- Hakuba Station in May 2024

General information
- Location: Hokujō-Yotsuya, Hakuba-mura, Kitaazumi-gun, Nagano-ken 399-9301; Japan
- Coordinates: 36°41′44.69″N 137°51′48.74″E
- Elevation: 697 meters
- Operator: JR East
- Line: ■ Ōito Line
- Distance: 59.7 km from Matsumoto
- Platforms: 1 side + 1 island platform
- Tracks: 3

Other information
- Status: Staffed (Midori no Madoguchi )
- Station code: 13
- Website: Official website

History
- Opened: November 20, 1932; 93 years ago
- Former names: Shinano-Yotsuya Station (until 1968)

Passengers
- FY2015: 321 daily

Services
Preceding station	JR East	Following station
Terminus	Azusa	Shinano-Ōmachi 23 towards Chiba or Tokyo
Shinano-Moriue One-way operation	Ōito Line Rapid	Kamishiro 15 towards Shinano-Ōmachi
Shinano-Moriue 12 towards Minami-Otari	Ōito Line Local	Iimori 14 towards Matsumoto
Location
- Location within Nagano Prefecture Location within Japan

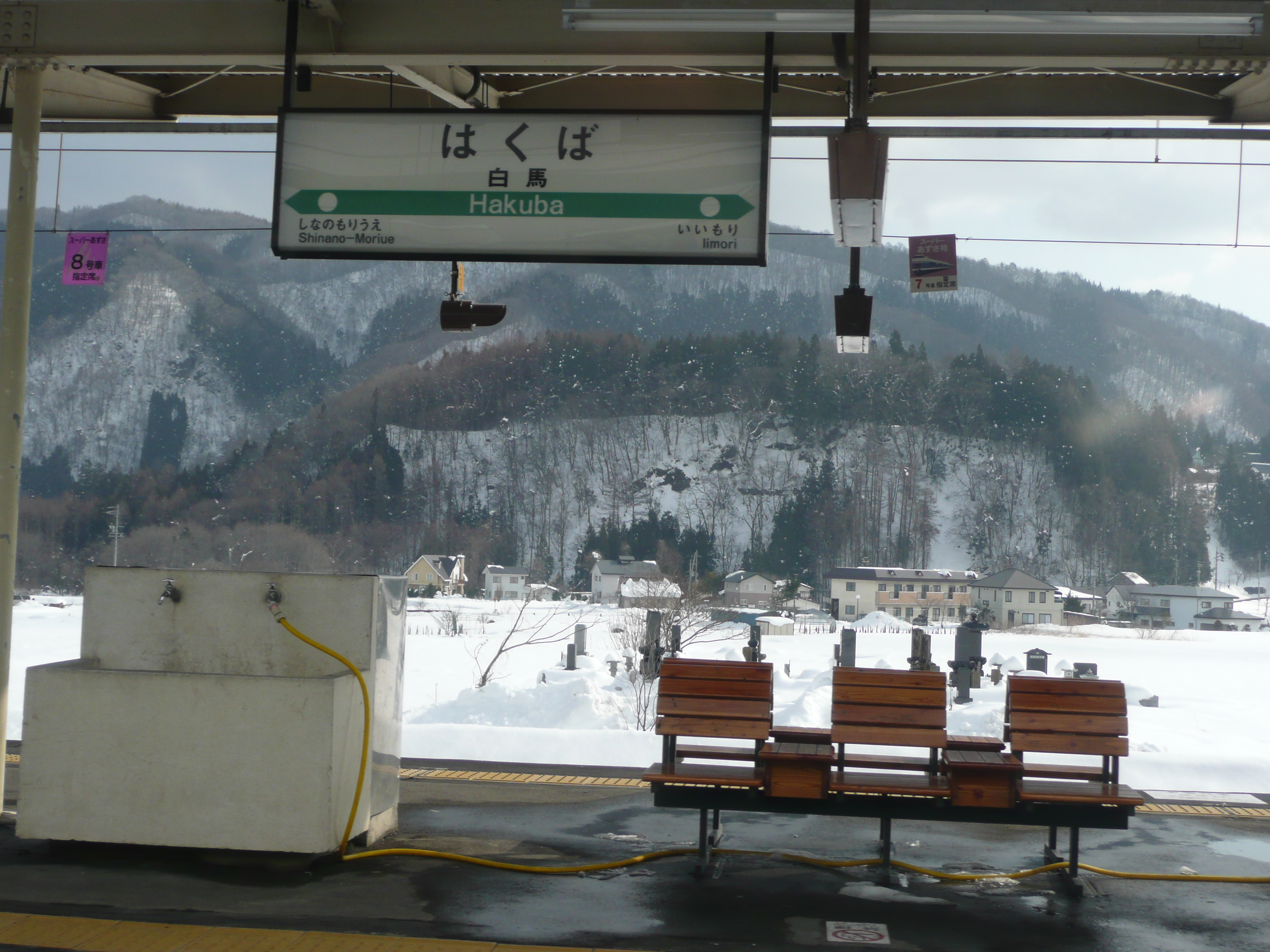
View from the platform of Hakuba Station

Hakuba Station (白馬駅, Hakuba-eki) is a railway station on the Ōito Line in the village of Hakuba, Kitaazumi District, Nagano Prefecture, Japan, operated by East Japan Railway Company (JR East).

One round-trip Azusa service per day (train numbers 5 and 46) starts and terminates at the station. Prior to the March 15, 2025 timetable revision, this train continued on to Minami-Otari.

== Lines ==
Hakuba Station is served by the Ōito Line and is 59.7 kilometers from the starting point of the line at Matsumoto Station.

== Layout ==
Hakuba Station consists of a one ground-level side platform and one island platform serving three tracks, connected by a footbridge. The station has a Midori no Madoguchi staffed ticket office.

=== Platforms ===
1-3	■ Ōito Line	for Shinano-Ōmachi, Toyoshina, and Matsumoto for Minami-Otari

== Bus Services ==
=== Highway buses ===
- Buses bound for Narita International Airport
- Chūō Kōsoku Bus (for Shinjuku Station)
- Buses bound for Nagano Station
- Buses bound for Matsumoto Bus Terminal and Matsumoto Station

== History ==
The station opened on November 20, 1932 as Shinano-Yotsuya Station (信濃四ツ谷駅). It was renamed Hakuba on October 1, 1968. With the privatization of Japanese National Railways (JNR) on April 1, 1987 the station came under the control of JR East.

== Passenger statistics ==
In fiscal 2015, the station was used by an average of 321 passengers daily (boarding passengers only).

== Surrounding area ==
- National Route 148
- National Route 406
- Hakuba Village Hall
- Hakuba High School

== See also ==
- List of railway stations in Japan
