= Matsumoto Station =

Railway station in Matsumoto, Nagano Prefecture, Japan

Ōito Line42 SN06 Matsumoto Station 松本駅
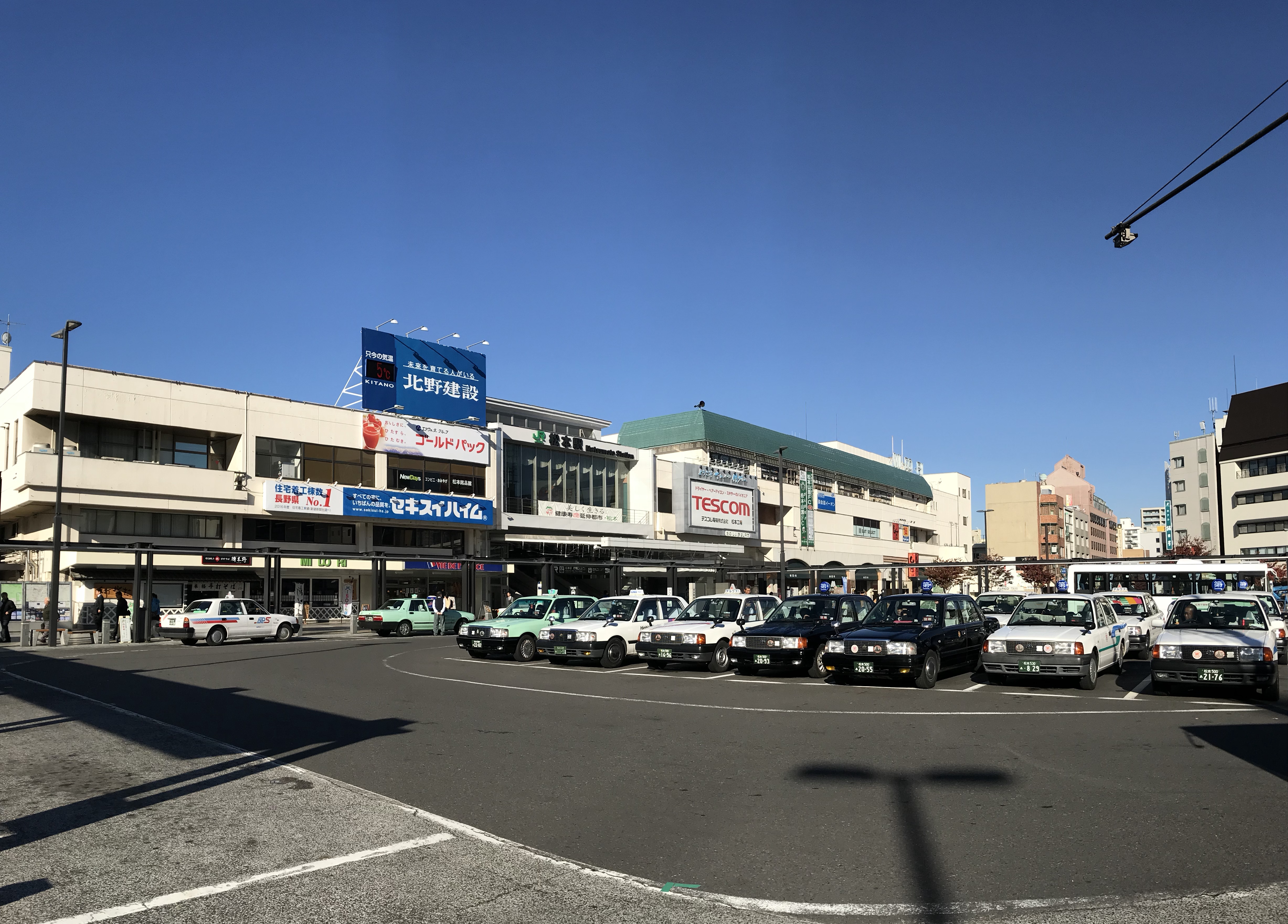
- Matsumoto Station in 2017

General information
- Location: 1-1-1 Fukashi, Matsumoto-shi, Nagano-ken 390-0815; Japan
- Coordinates: 36.2305°N 137.9639°E
- Elevation: 586 meters
- Operator: JR East; Alpico Kōtsū
- Lines: Shinonoi Line; ■ Ōito Line; ■ Kamikōchi Line
- Distance: 13.3 km from Shiojiri
- Platforms: 4 island platforms

Other information
- Status: Staffed (Midori no Madoguchi)
- Station code: 42, SN06 (JR East); AK-01 (Alpico Kōtsū)
- Website: Official website

History
- Opened: 15 June 1902; 124 years ago

Passengers
- FY2015: 16,303 daily (JR East)

Services
Preceding station	JR East	Following station
Toyoshina 34 towards Hakuba	Azusa	Shiojiri SN01 towards Chiba or Tokyo
Kita-Matsumoto One-way operation	Ōito Line Rapid	Terminus
Kita-Matsumoto 41 towards Minami-Otari	Ōito Line Local	Terminus
Shiojiri SN01 Terminus	Shinano	Akashina SN08 towards Nagano
Minami-Matsumoto SN05 towards Shiojiri	Shinonoi Line Rapid; Local & Rapid Misuzu	Tazawa SN07 towards Shinonoi
Preceding station	Alpico Kōtsū	Following station
Nishi-Matsumoto (AK-02) towards Shinshimashima	Kamikōchi Line	Terminus
Location
- Location within Nagano Prefecture Location within Japan

Matsumoto Station (松本駅, Matsumoto-eki) is a train station in the city of Matsumoto, Nagano Prefecture, Japan, operated by East Japan Railway Company (JR East), and the private railway operator Alpico Kōtsū.

== Lines ==
Matsumoto Station is served by the Shinonoi Line and is 13.3 kilometers from the terminus of the line at Shiojiri Station. It is also a terminal station for the Ōito Line. Chūō Main Line trains using the Shinonoi Line tracks also pass through Matsumoto. Matsumoto is also a terminus for the 14.4 kilometer private Kamikōchi Line operated by Alpico Kōtsū.

== Station layout ==
The JR-East station consists of a three ground-level island platforms, connected to the station building by an elevated station building. The Alpico Kōtsū portion of the station has a single island platform, connected to the JR portion of the station by a footbridge. The station has a Midori no Madoguchi staffed ticket office.

=== Platforms ===
0	■ Chūō Main Line	for Shiojiri, Kami-Suwa, Kōfu, and Shinjuku
	■ Chūō Main Line	for Shiojiri, Kiso-Fukushima, Nakatsugawa, and Nagoya
1, 5	■ Chūō Main Line	for Shiojiri, Kami-Suwa, Kōfu, and Shinjuku
	■ Chūō Main Line	for Shiojiri, Kiso-Fukushima, Nakatsugawa, and Nagoya
	■ Shinonoi Line	for Shinonoi and Nagano
2, 3	■ Chūō Main Line	for Shiojiri, Kami-Suwa, Kōfu, and Shinjuku
	■ Shinonoi Line	for Shinonoi and Nagano
	■ Ōito Line	for Toyoshina, Hotaka, Shinano-Ōmachi, Hakuba, and Minami-Otari
4	■ Chūō Main Line	for Shiojiri, Kami-Suwa, Kōfu, and Shinjuku
	■ Shinonoi Line	for Shinonoi and Nagano
6	■ Ōito Line	for Toyoshina, Hotaka, Shinano-Ōmachi, Hakuba, and Minami-Otari
7	■ Kamikochi Line	for Shinano-Arai, Niimura, Hata, and Shin-Shimashima

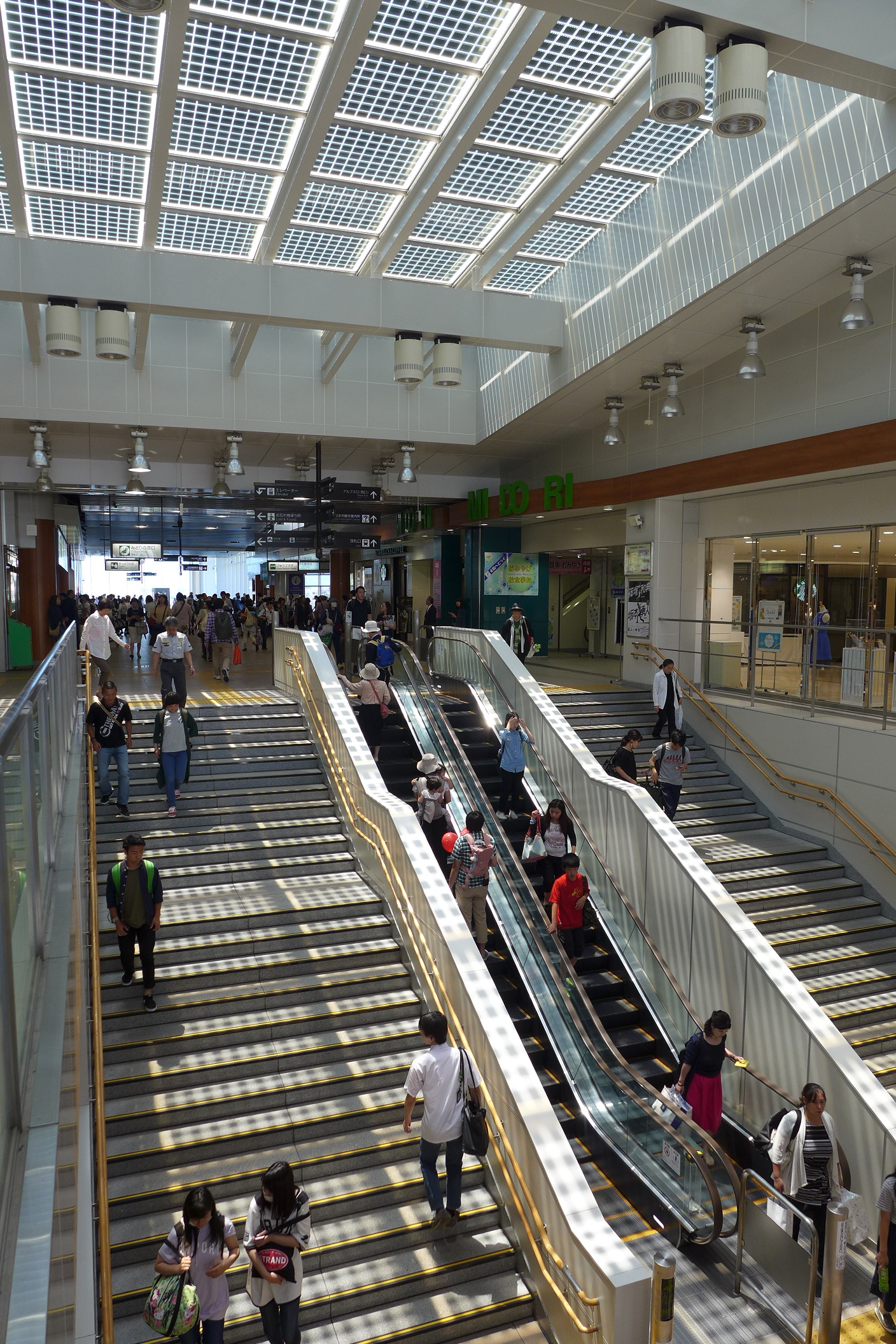
The station entrance interior in June 2017

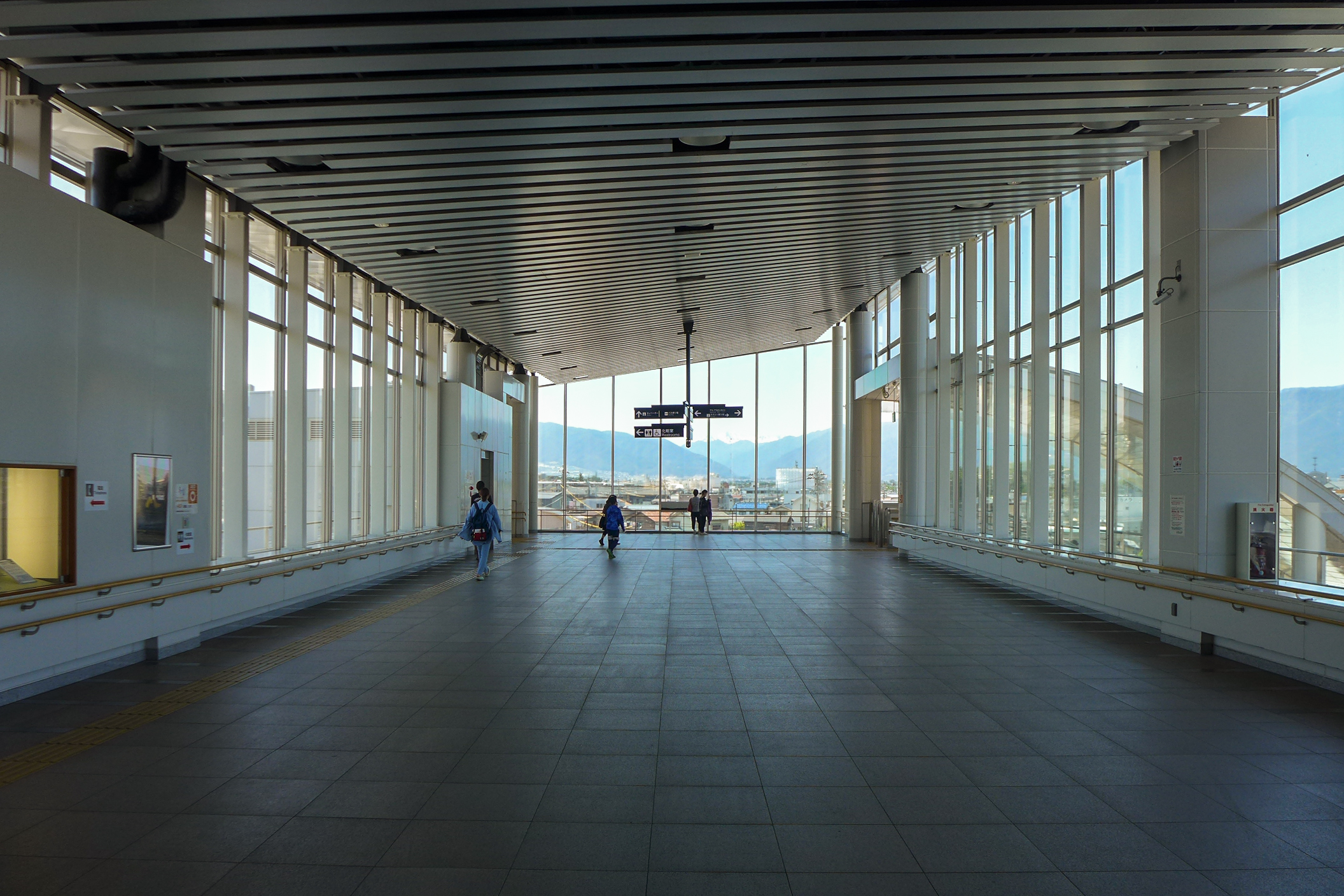
The connecting passageway in June 2017

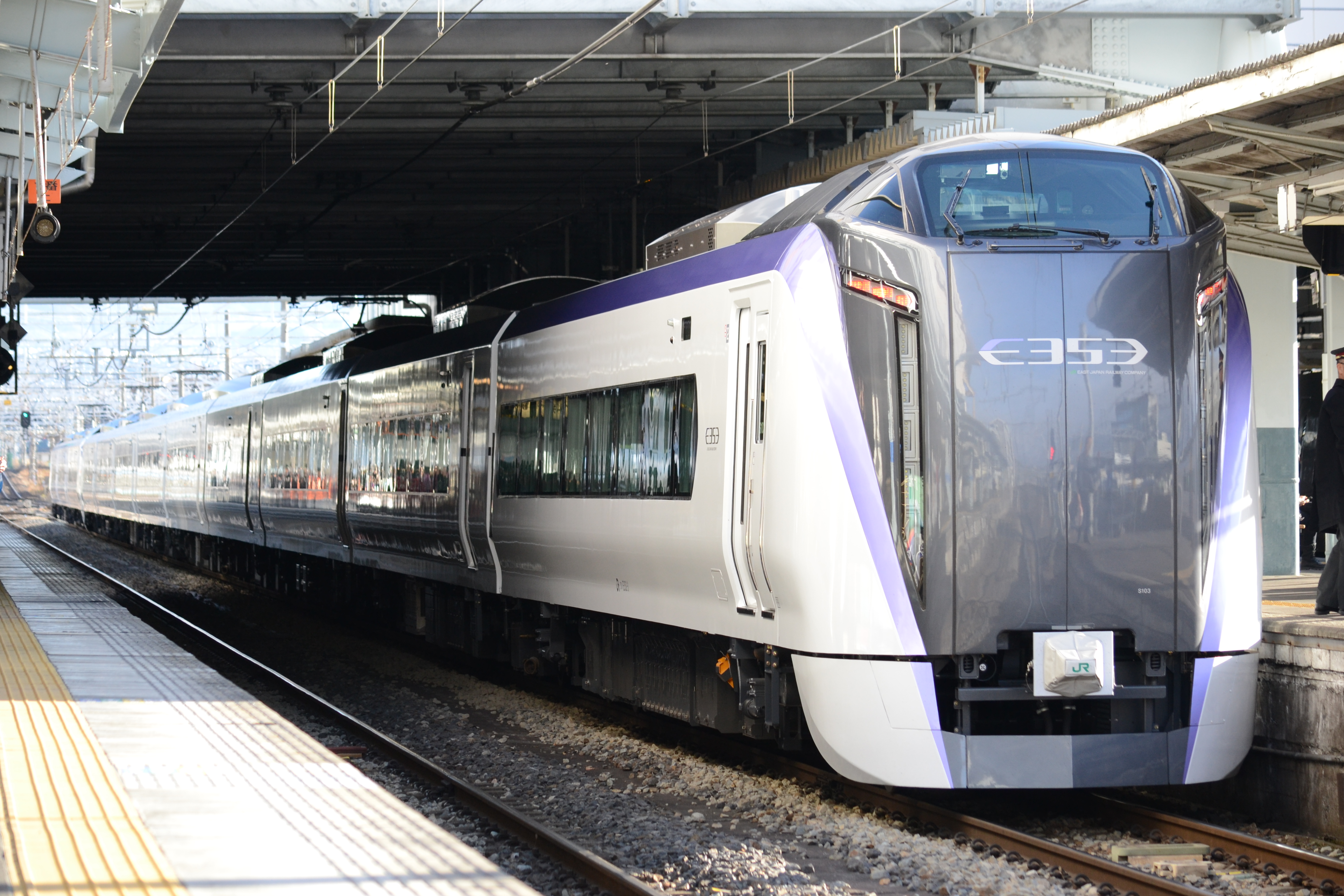
A New Azusa limited express service at platform 4 in January 2018

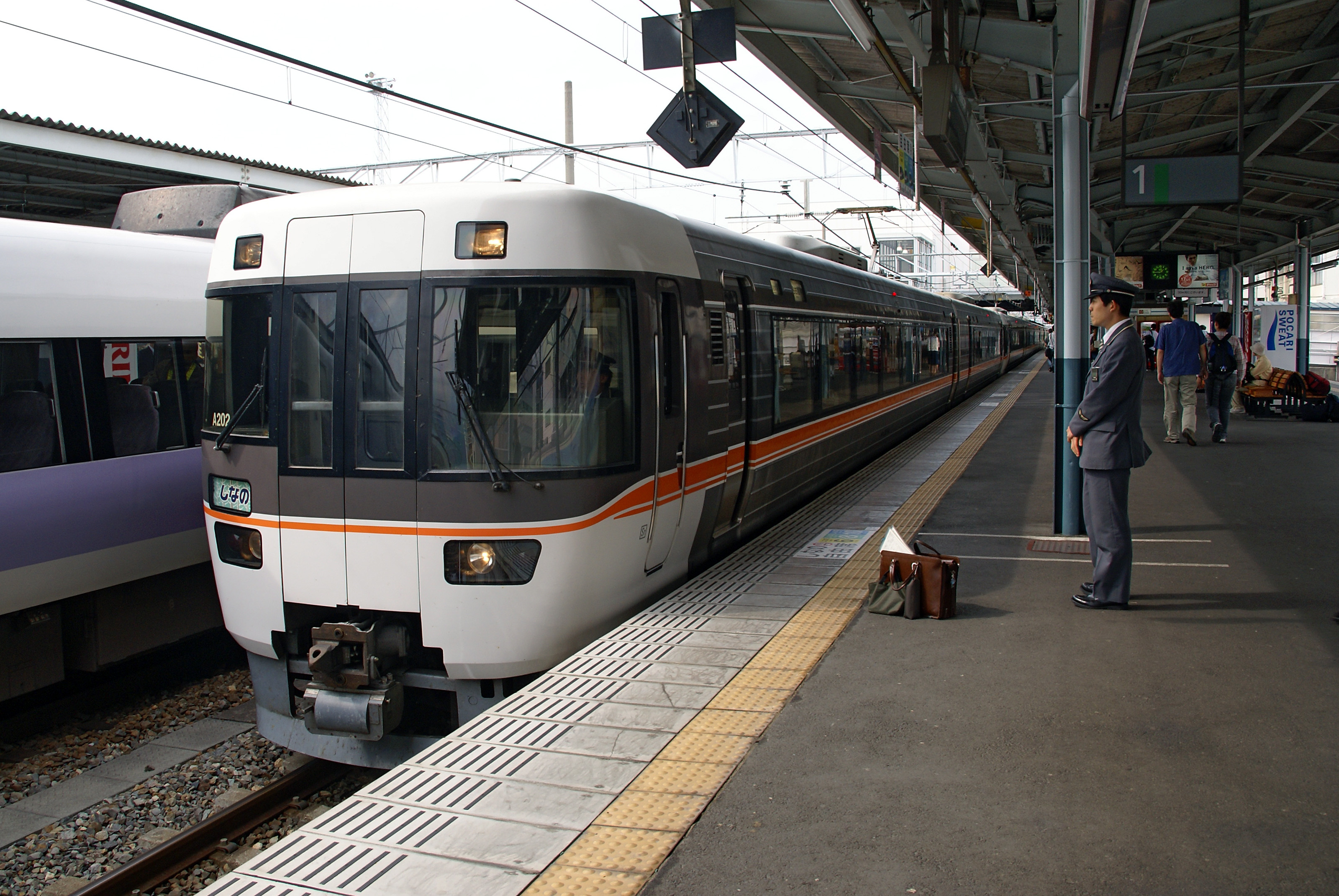
A Shinano limited express service at platform 1 in September 2007

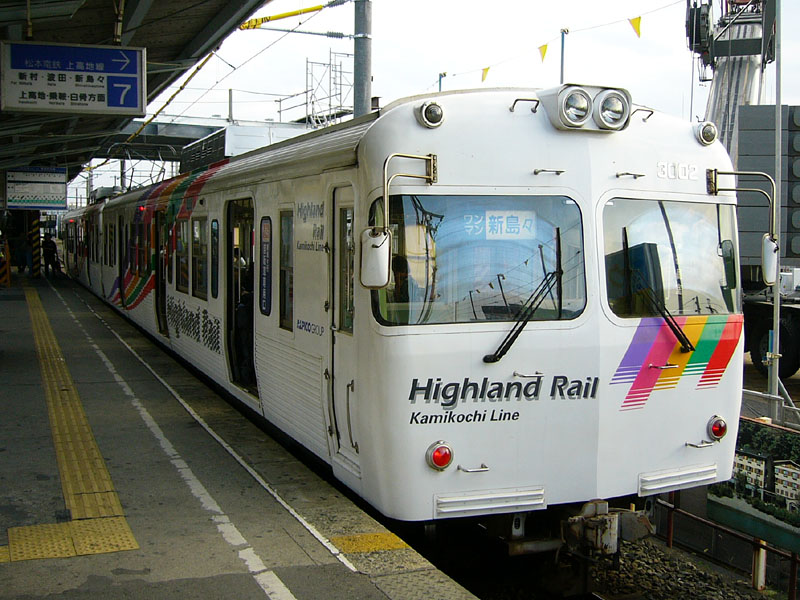
The Kamikochi Line platform 7 in September 2005

== History ==
Matsumoto Station opened on 15 June 1902. With the privatization of Japanese National Railways (JNR) on 1 April 1987, the station came under the control of JR East. Station numbering was introduced on the Shinonoi Line from February 2025, with the station being assigned number SN06.

== Passenger statistics ==
In fiscal 2015, the JR East portion of the station was used by an average of 16,303 passengers daily (boarding passengers only).

== Surrounding area ==
- Matsumoto City Hall
- National Route 143

== See also ==
- Matsumoto Bus Terminal
- List of railway stations in Japan
