= Japan National Route 147 =

National highway in Japan

National Route 147
- 国道147号
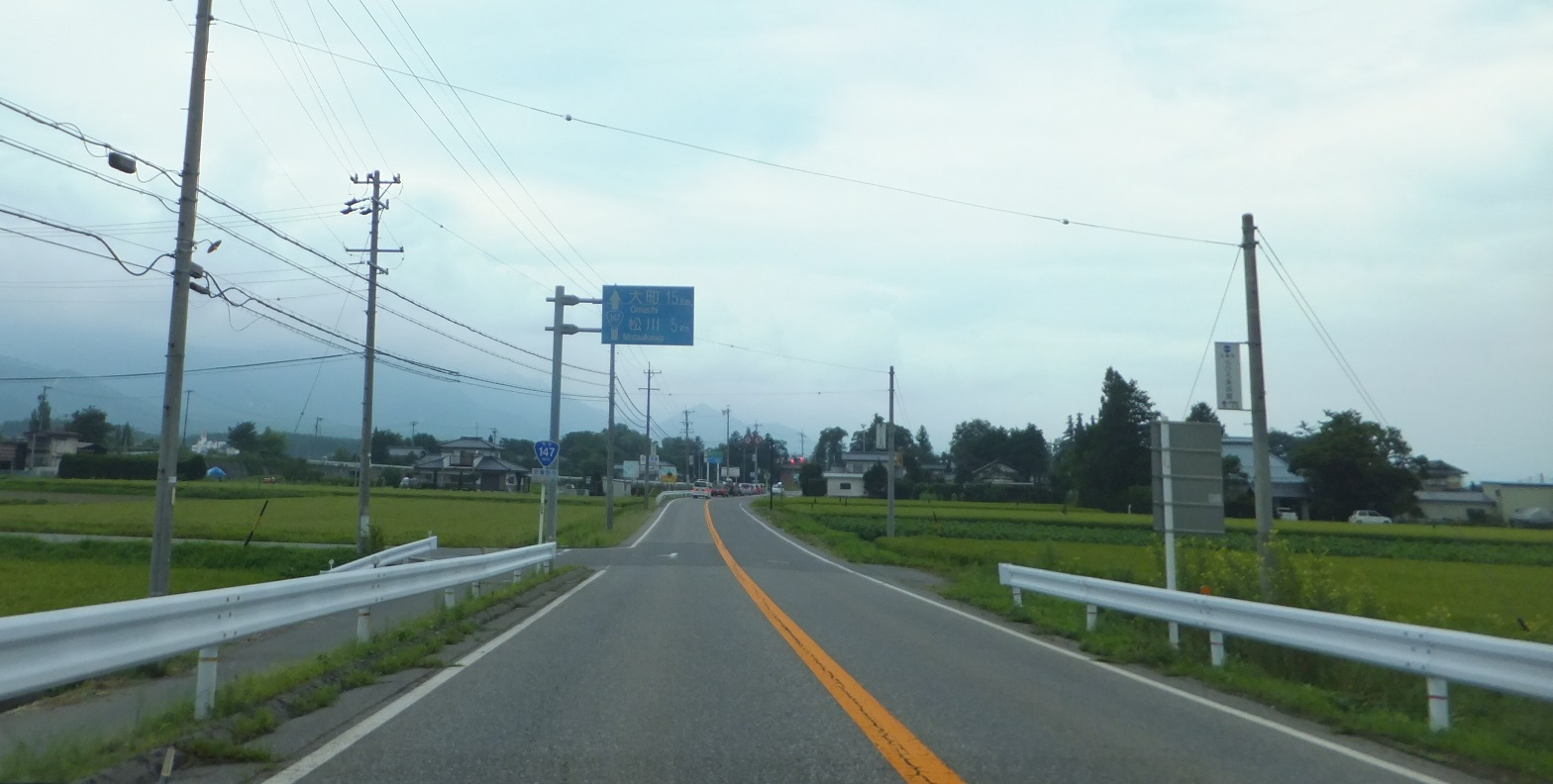

Route information
- Length: 31.4 km (19.5 mi)
- Existed: 1953–present

Major junctions
- North end: National Route 148 in Ōmachi, Nagano
- South end: National Route 19 / National Route 254 in Matsumoto, Nagano

Location
- Country: Japan

Highway system
- National highways of Japan; Expressways of Japan
← National Route 146	→ National Route 148

National Route 147 (国道147号, Kokudō hyaku-yonjūnana-gō) is a national highway of Japan connecting Ōmachi City and Matsumoto City in Japan.

== Route data ==
- Length: 31.4 km (19.5 mi)
- Origin: Ōmachi City (originates at junction with Route 148)
- Terminus: Matsumoto City (ends at Junction with Route 19, Route 254)
- Major cities: Azumino City

== History ==
- 1953-05-18 - Second Class National Highway 147 (from Ōmachi to Matsumoto)
- 1965-04-01 - General National Highway 147
