= Minami-Otari Station =

Railway station in Otari, Nagano Prefecture, Japan

Ōito Line9 Minami-Otari Station 南小谷駅
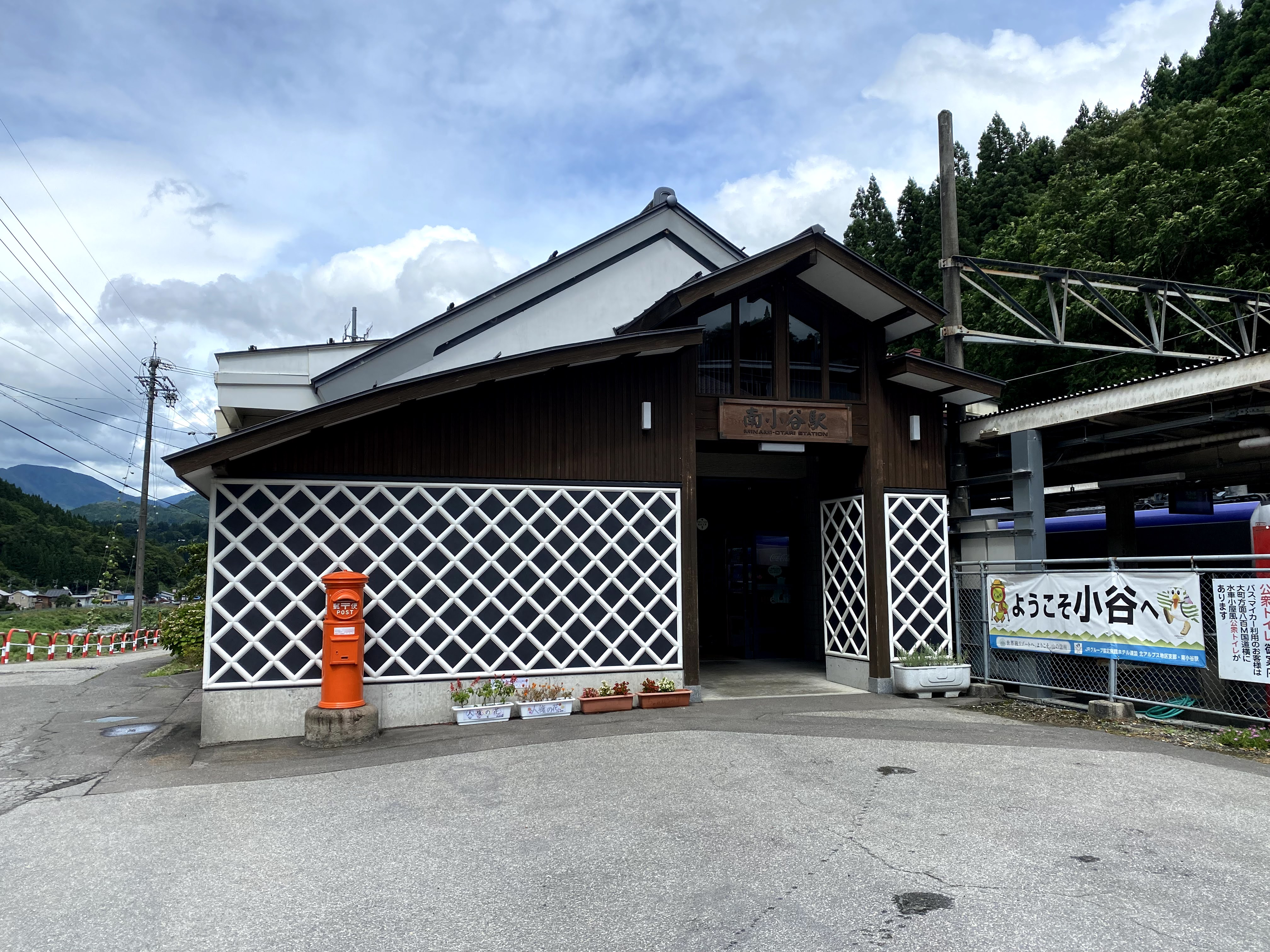
- Minami-Otari Station in August 2021

General information
- Location: 10356 Chikuni, Otari Village, Kitaazumi District, Nagano Prefecture 399-9422; Japan
- Coordinates: 36°46′29″N 137°54′30″E
- Elevation: 513.1 m (1,683 ft)
- Operator: JR East
- Line: ■■ Ōito Line
- Distance: 70.1 km (43.6 mi) from Matsumoto
- Platforms: 1 side + 1 island platform
- Tracks: 3
- Train operators: JR East; JR West

Other information
- Status: Staffed ("Midori no Madoguchi")
- Station code: 9

History
- Opened: 29 November 1935; 90 years ago

Passengers
- FY2015: 121 daily

Services
Preceding station	JR East	Following station
Terminus	Ōito Line Rapid	Shinano-Moriue 12 towards Shinano-Ōmachi
Terminus	Ōito Line Local	Chikuni 10 towards Matsumoto
Preceding station	JR West	Following station
Nakatsuchi towards Itoigawa	Ōito Line	Terminus
Location
- Location within Nagano Prefecture Location within Japan

Minami-Otari Station (南小谷駅, Minami-Otari-eki) is a railway station on the Ōito Line in the village of Otari, Kitaazumi District, Nagano Prefecture, Japan. The station is numbered "9". The station is on the electrical borderline of the JR East and JR West systems and operations are shared between the two companies. The section north of this station, operated by JR West is not electrified and all JR East services terminate here.

Prior to the March 15, 2025 timetable revision, one round-trip Azusa service per day (train numbers 5 and 46) also started and terminated at Minami-Otari. This train now only runs to Hakuba.

== Lines ==
Minami-Otari Station is served by the Ōito Line and is 70.1 kilometers from the starting point of the line at Matsumoto Station.

== Station layout ==
Minami-Otari Station consists of a one ground-level side platform and one island platform serving three tracks, connected by a footbridge. The station has a "Midori no Madoguchi" staffed ticket office.

=== Platforms ===
1,2,3	■ Ōito Line	for Hakuba, Shinano-Ōmachi, Matsumoto and Shinjuku
2,3	■ Ōito Line	for Itoigawa

== Passenger statistics ==
In fiscal 2015, the station was used by an average of 121 passengers daily (boarding passengers only).

== Surrounding area ==
- Otari village hall
- National Route 148

== See also ==
- List of railway stations in Japan
