= Moriguchi Station (Nagano) =

Railway station in Matsumoto, Nagano Prefecture, Japan

Moriguchi Station 森口駅
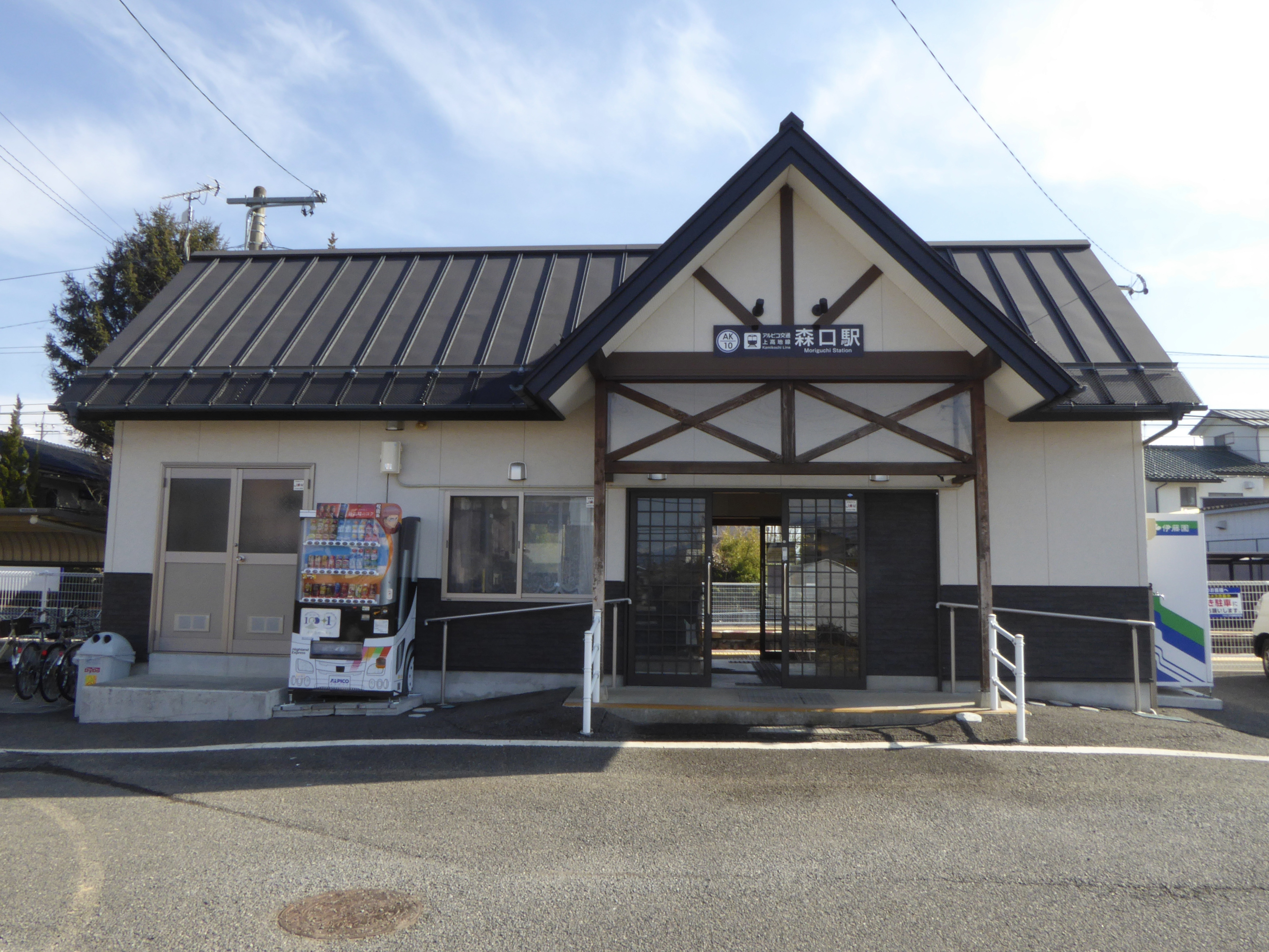
- Moriguchi Station in March 2022

General information
- Location: 4417-25 Hata-Moriguchi, Matsumoto-shi, Nagano-ken 390-1401; Japan
- Coordinates: 36°12′29.3″N 137°52′52.73″E
- Operator: Alpico Kōtsū
- Line: ■ Kamikōchi Line
- Distance: 8.6 km from Matsumoto
- Platforms: 2 side platform
- Tracks: 2

Other information
- Station code: AK-10
- Website: Official website

History
- Opened: 10 May 1922

Passengers
- FY2016: 279
Location
- Location within Nagano Prefecture Location within Japan

Moriguchi Station (森口駅, Moriguchi-eki) is a railway station in the city of Matsumoto, Nagano, Japan, operated by the private railway operating company Alpico Kōtsū.

== Lines ==
Moriguchi Station is a station on the Kamikōchi Line and is 8.6 kilometers from the terminus of the line at Matsumoto Station.

== Station layout ==
The station has two ground-level side platforms serving two tracks, connected to the station building by a level crossing.

=== Platforms ===
1	■ Kamikōchi Line	for Niimura, Shinano-Arai, and Matsumoto
2	■ Kamikōchi Line	for Shinshimashima

== Adjacent stations ==
«	Service	»
Kamikōchi Line
Samizo	Local	Shimojima

== History ==
The station opened on 10 May 1922. A new station building was completed in March 2012.

== Passenger statistics ==
In fiscal 2016, the station was used by an average of 279 passengers daily (boarding passengers only).

== Surrounding area ==
- National Route 158

== See also ==
- List of railway stations in Japan
