= Samizo Station =

Railway station in Matsumoto, Nagano Prefecture, Japan

Samizo Station 三溝駅
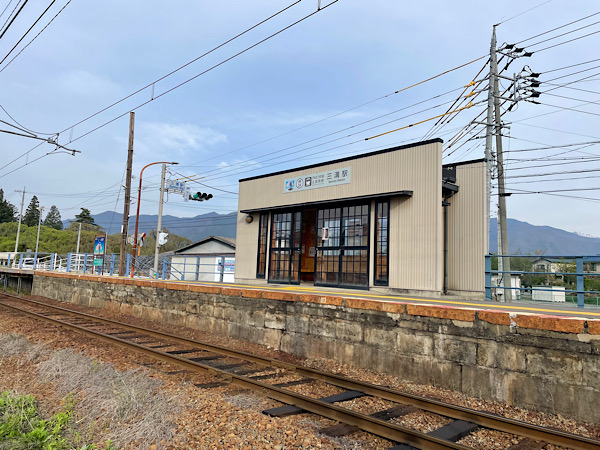
- Samizo Station in April 2022

General information
- Location: 1680-2 Hata-Samizo, Matsumoto-shi, Nagano-ken 390-1401; Japan
- Coordinates: 36°12′46.3″N 137°53′29.31″E
- Operator: Alpico Kōtsū
- Line: ■ Kamikōchi Line
- Distance: 7.6 km from Matsumoto
- Platforms: 1 side platform
- Tracks: 1

Other information
- Station code: AK-09
- Website: Official website

History
- Opened: 10 May 1922

Passengers
- FY2016: 178
Location
- Location within Nagano Prefecture Location within Japan

Samizo Station (三溝駅, Samizo-eki) is a railway station in the city of Matsumoto, Nagano, Japan. It is operated by the private railway operating company Alpico Kōtsū.

== Lines ==
Samizo Station is a station on the Kamikōchi Line and is 7.6 kilometers from the terminus of the line at Matsumoto Station.

== Station layout ==
The station has one ground-level side platform serving a single bi-directional track. The station does not have a station building, but only a waiting room on the platform. The station is unattended.

== Adjacent stations ==
«	Service	»
Kamikōchi Line
Niimura	Local	Moriguchi

== History ==
The station opened on 10 May 1922.

== Passenger statistics ==
In fiscal 2016, the station was used by an average of 178 passengers daily (boarding passengers only).

== Surrounding area ==
- National Route 158

== See also ==
- List of railway stations in Japan
