= Shimonii Station =

Railway station in Matsumoto, Nagano Prefecture, Japan

Shimonii Station 下新駅
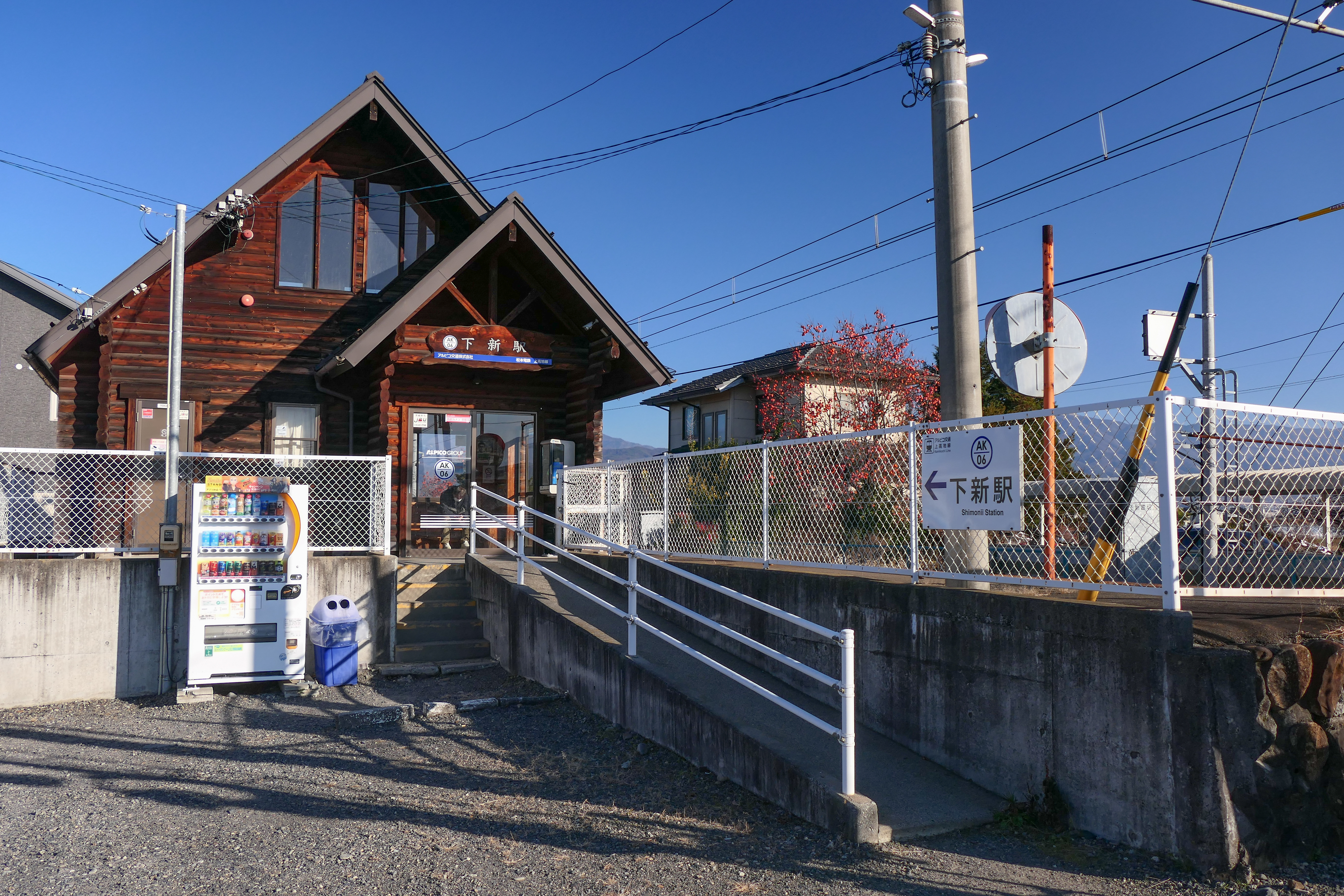
- Shimonii Station in December 2022

General information
- Location: 3287 Niimura, Matsumoto-shi, Nagano-ken 390-1241; Japan
- Coordinates: 36°13′30.47″N 137°55′20.1″E
- Operator: Alpico Kōtsū
- Line: ■ Kamikōchi Line
- Distance: 4.4 km from Matsumoto
- Platforms: 1 side platform
- Tracks: 1

Other information
- Station code: AK-06
- Website: Official website

History
- Opened: 2 October 1921

Passengers
- FY2016: 90
Location
- Location within Nagano Prefecture Location within Japan

Shimonii Station (下新駅, Shimonii-eki) is a railway station in the city of Matsumoto, Nagano, Japan, operated by the private railway operating company Alpico Kōtsū.

== Lines ==
Shimonii Station is a station on the Kamikōchi Line and is 4.4 kilometers from the terminus of the line at Matsumoto Station.

== Station layout ==
The station has one ground-level side platform serving a single bi-directional track.

== Adjacent stations ==
«	Service	»
Kamikōchi Line
Ōniwa	Local	Kitanii-Matsumotodaigakumae

== History ==
The station opened on 2 October 1921. The station building was rebuilt in 1997.

== Passenger statistics ==
In fiscal 2016, the station was used by an average of 90 passengers daily (boarding passengers only).

== Surrounding area ==
- National Route 158

== See also ==
- List of railway stations in Japan
