= Ōniwa Station =

Railway station in Matsumoto, Nagano Prefecture, Japan

Ōniwa Station 大庭駅
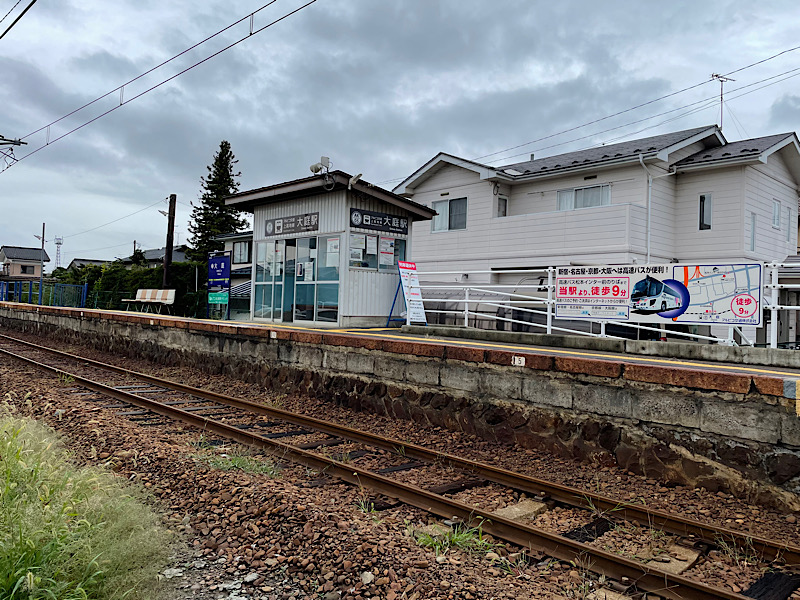
- Ōniwa Station in October 2021

General information
- Location: 2868 Shimadachi, Matsumoto-shi, Nagano-ken 390-0852; Japan
- Coordinates: 36°13′37.4″N 137°56′29.95″E
- Operator: Alpico Kōtsū
- Line: ■ Kamikōchi Line
- Distance: 2.6 km from Matsumoto
- Platforms: 1 side platform
- Tracks: 1

Other information
- Station code: AK-05
- Website: Official website

History
- Opened: 2 October 1921

Passengers
- FY2016: 159
Location
- Location within Nagano Prefecture Location within Japan

Ōniwa Station (大庭駅, Ōniwa-eki) is a railway station in the city of Matsumoto, Nagano, Japan, operated by the private railway operating company Alpico Kōtsū.

== Lines ==
Ōniwa Station is a station on the Kamikōchi Line and is 2.6 kilometers from the terminus of the line at Matsumoto Station.

== Station layout ==
The station has one ground-level side platform serving a single bi-directional track.

== Adjacent stations ==
| « | Service | » |
Kamikōchi Line
| Shinano-Arai | Local | Shimonii |

== History ==
The station opened on 2 October 1921.

== Passenger statistics ==
In fiscal 2016, the station was used by an average of 159 passengers daily (boarding passengers only).

== Surrounding area ==
- Shimadachi Elementary School
- Matsumoto Chikuma High School
- Japan Ukiyo-e Museum
- National Route 158

== See also ==
- List of railway stations in Japan
