= Shimojima Station (Matsumoto, Nagano) =

Railway station in Matsumoto, Nagano Prefecture, Japan

Shimojima Station 下島駅
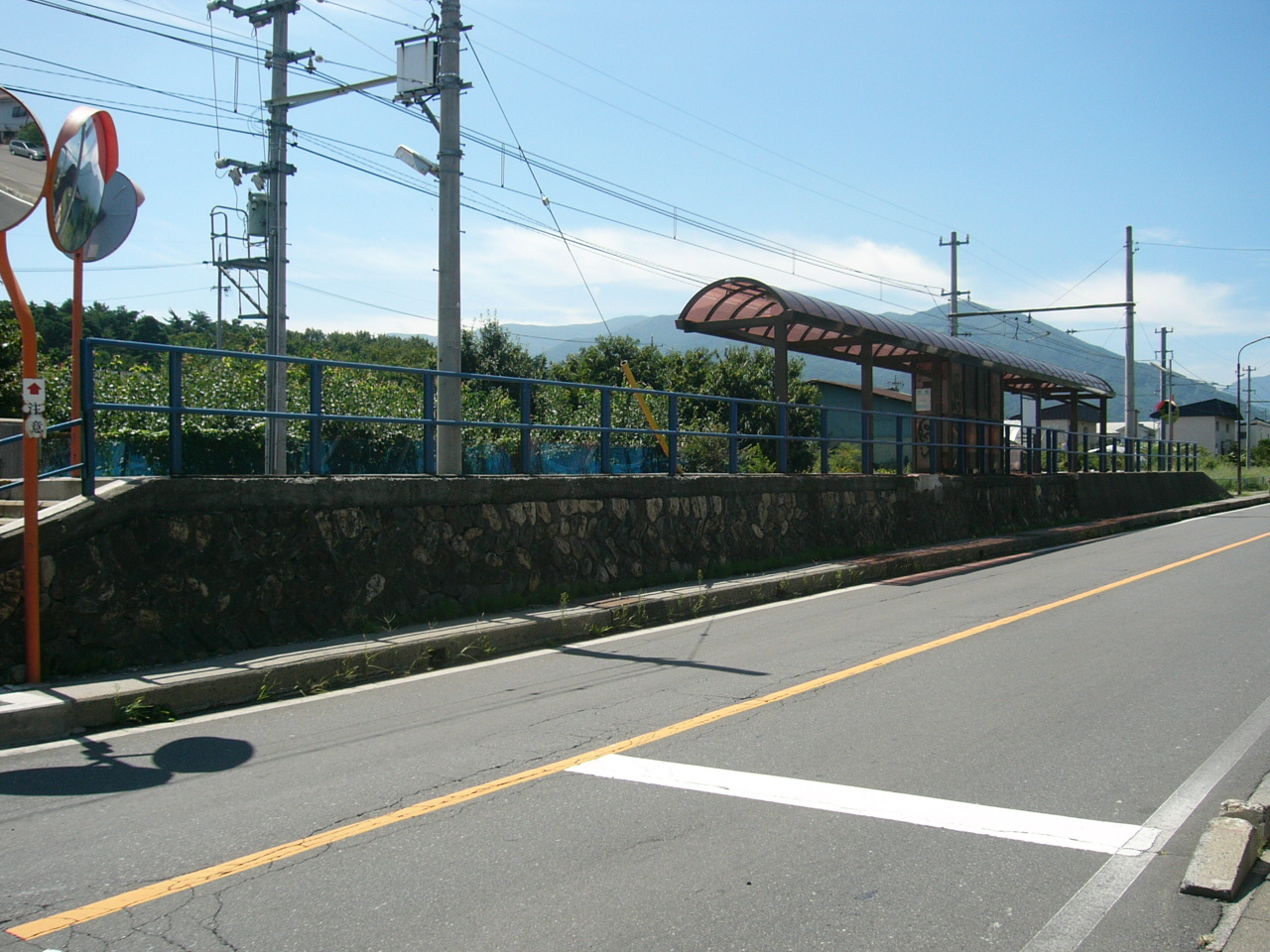
- Shimojima Station in September 2006

General information
- Location: 4417-12 Hata-Shimojima, Matsumoto-shi, Nagano-ken 390-1401; Japan
- Coordinates: 36°12′22.85″N 137°52′19.12″E
- Operator: Alpico Kōtsū
- Line: ■ Kamikōchi Line
- Distance: 9.5 km from Matsumoto
- Platforms: 1 side platform
- Tracks: 1

Other information
- Station code: AK-11
- Website: Official website

History
- Opened: 10 May 1922

Passengers
- FY2016: 211
Location
- Location within Nagano Prefecture Location within Japan

Shimojima Station (下島駅, Shimojima-eki) is a railway station in the city of Matsumoto, Nagano, Japan. It is operated by the private railway operating company Alpico Kōtsū.

== Lines ==
Shimojima Station is on the Kamikōchi Line and is 9.5 kilometers from the terminus of the line at Matsumoto Station.

== Station layout ==
The station has one ground-level side platform serving a single bi-directional track. The station does not have a station building, but only a waiting room on the platform. The station is unattended.

== Adjacent stations ==
«	Service	»
Kamikōchi Line
Moriguchi	Local	Hata

== History ==
The station opened on 10 May 1922.

== Passenger statistics ==
In the fiscal year 2016, the station was used by an average of 211 passengers daily (boarding passengers only).

== Surrounding area ==
- Azusagawa High School
- National Route 158

== See also ==
- List of railway stations in Japan
