= Kitanii-Matsumotodaigakumae Station =

Railway station in Matsumoto, Nagano Prefecture, Japan

Kitanii-Matsumotodaigakumae Station 北新・松本大学前駅
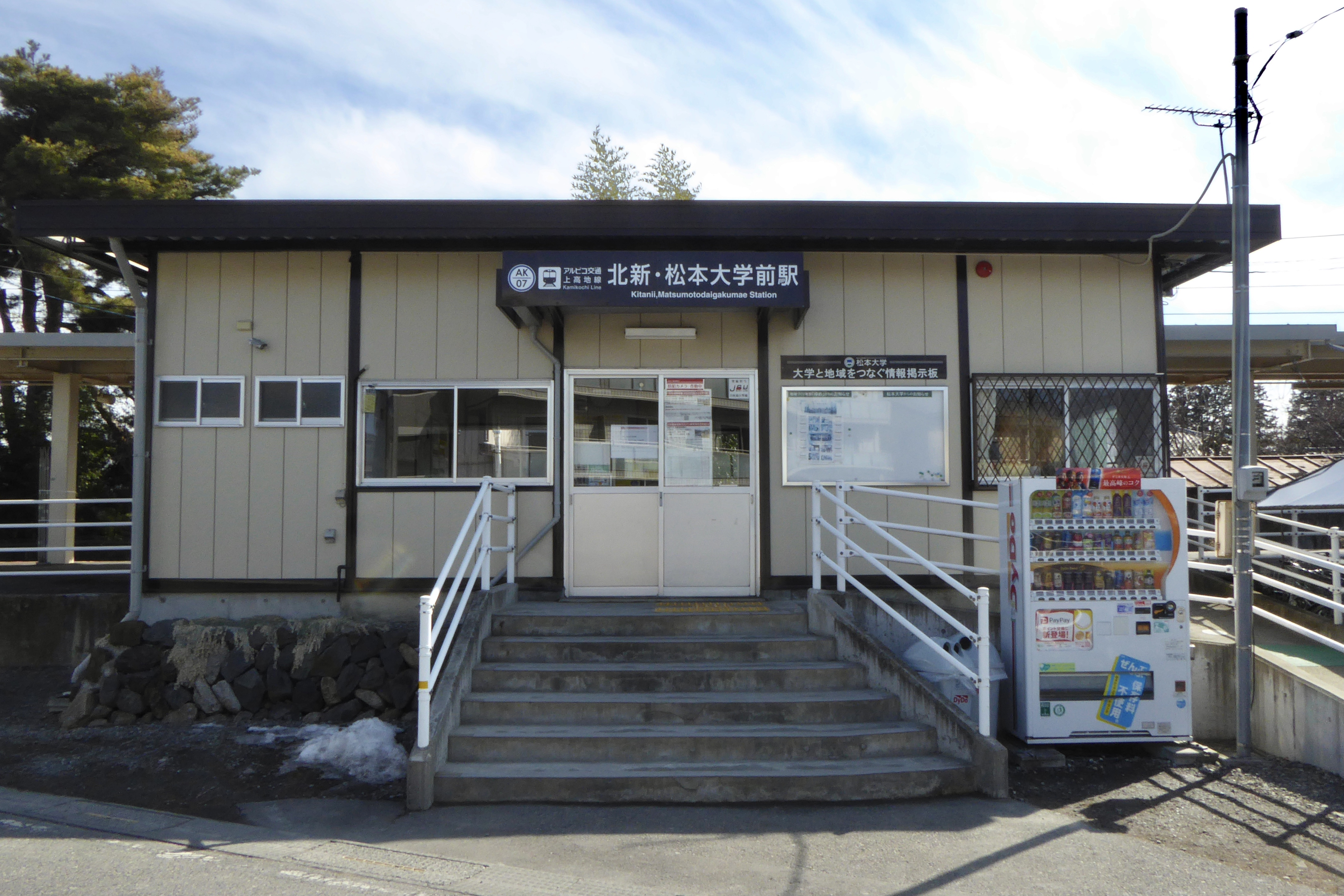
- Kitanii-Matsumotodaigakumae Station in March 2022

General information
- Location: 2088 Daigaku-Niimura, Matsumoto-shi, Nagano-ken 390-1241; Japan
- Coordinates: 36°13′11.14″N 137°54′50.06″E
- Operator: Alpico Kōtsū
- Line: ■ Kamikōchi Line
- Distance: 5.4 km from Matsumoto
- Platforms: 1 side platform
- Tracks: 1

Other information
- Station code: AK-07
- Website: Official website

History
- Opened: 2 October 1921
- Former names: Kitanii Station (to 1922)

Passengers
- FY2016: 603
Location
- Location within Nagano Prefecture Location within Japan

Kitanii-Matsumotodaigakumae Station (北新・松本大学前駅, Kitanii-Matsumotodaigakumae-eki) is a railway station in the city of Matsumoto, Nagano, Japan, operated by the private railway operating company Alpico Kōtsū.

== Lines ==
Kitanii-Matsumotodaigakumae Station is a station on the Kamikōchi Line and is 5.4 kilometers from the terminus of the line at Matsumoto Station.

== Station layout ==
The station has one ground-level side platform serving a single bi-directional track.

== Adjacent stations ==
«	Service	»
Kamikōchi Line
Shimonii	Local	Niimura

== History ==
The station opened on 2 October 1921 as Kitanii Station (北新駅). It was given its present name on 31 October 1922.

== Passenger statistics ==
In fiscal 2016, the station was used by an average of 603 passengers daily (boarding passengers only).

== Surrounding area ==
- Matsumoto University
- National Route 158

== See also ==
- List of railway stations in Japan
