= Echizen-Takada Station =

Railway station in Fukui, Fukui Prefecture, Japan

Echizen-Takada Station 越前高田駅
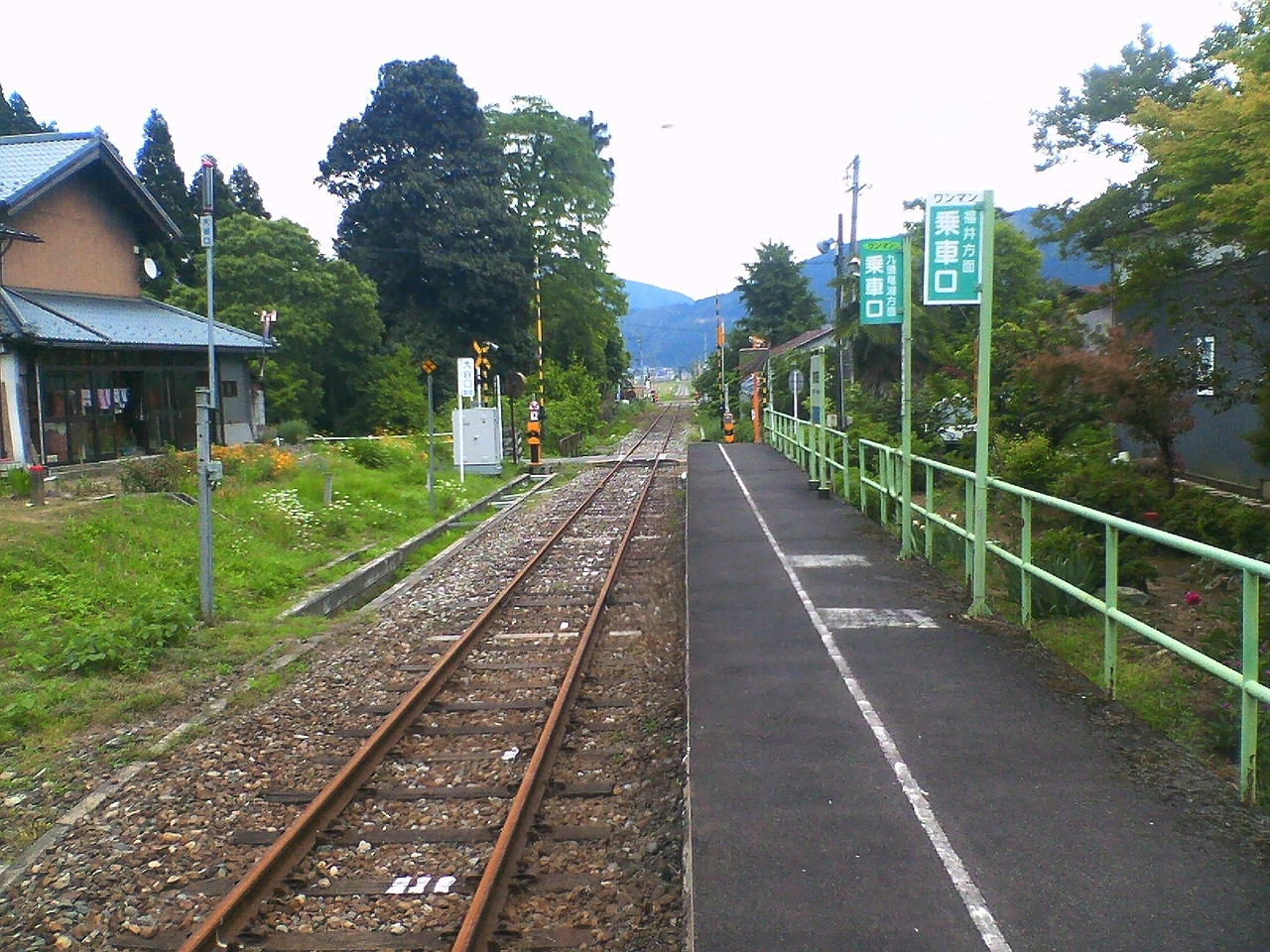
- Echizen-Takada Station in June 2007

General information
- Location: 26 Takadacho, Fukui, Fukui Prefecture 910-2226; Japan
- Coordinates: 36°01′29″N 136°19′07″E
- Operator: JR West
- Line: ■ Etsumi-Hoku Line (Kuzuryū Line)
- Distance: 11.4 km from Echizen-Hanandō
- Platforms: 1 side platform
- Tracks: 1

Other information
- Status: Unstaffed
- Website: Official website

History
- Opened: May 20, 1964

Passengers
- FY2015: 7 daily
Location
- Location within Japan

Echizen-Takada Station (越前高田駅, Echizen-Takada-eki) is a JR West railway station in the city of Fukui, Fukui, Japan.

== Lines ==
Echizen-Takada Station is served by the Etsumi-Hoku Line, and is located 11.4 kilometers from the terminus of the line at Echizen-Hanandō and 14.0 kilometers from Fukui.

== Station layout ==
The station consists of one ground-level side platform serving single bi-directional track. There is no station building, but only a shelter on the platform. The station is unattended.

== Adjacent stations ==
| « | Service | » |
Etsumi Hoku Line
| Ichijōdani | Local | Ichinami |

== History ==
Echizen-Takada Station opened on May 20, 1964. With the privatization of Japanese National Railways (JNR) on 1 April 1987, the station came under the control of JR West.

== Surrounding area ==
- National Route 364
- National Route 158

== See also ==
- List of railway stations in Japan
