= Hata Station (Nagano) =

Railway station in Matsumoto, Nagano Prefecture, Japan

Hata Station 波田駅
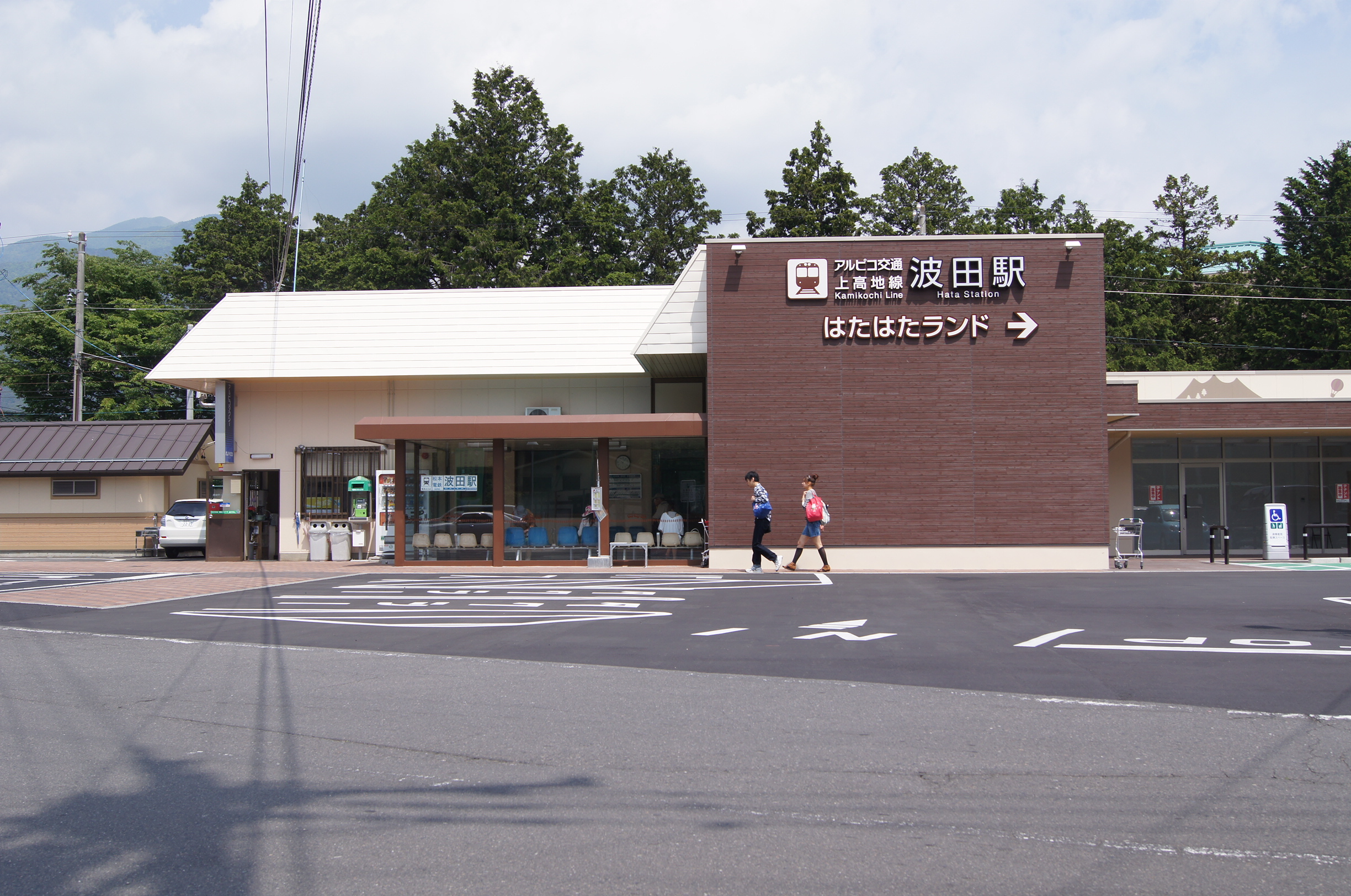
- Hata Station in June 2012

General information
- Location: 4417-28 Hata-Tanabe, Matsumoto-shi, Nagano-ken 390-1401; Japan
- Coordinates: 36°12′1.28″N 137°51′23.05″E
- Operator: Alpico Kōtsū
- Line: ■ Kamikōchi Line
- Distance: 11.1 km from Matsumoto
- Platforms: 1 island platform
- Tracks: 2

Other information
- Station code: AK-12
- Website: Official website

History
- Opened: 10 May 1922

Passengers
- FY2016: 562
Location
- Location within Nagano Prefecture Location within Japan

Hata Station (波田駅, Hata-eki) is a railway station in the city of Matsumoto, Nagano, Japan, operated by the private railway operating company Alpico Kōtsū.

== Lines ==
Hata Station is a station on the Kamikōchi Line and is 11.1 kilometers from the terminus of the line at Matsumoto Station.

== Station layout ==
The station has one ground-level island platform serving two tracks, connected to the station building by a level crossing.

=== Platforms ===
1	■ Kamikōchi Line	for Shinshimashima
2	■ Kamikōchi Line	for Niimura, Shinano-Arai, and Matsumoto

== Adjacent stations ==
«	Service	»
Kamikōchi Line
Shimojima	Local	Endō

== History ==
The station opened on 10 May 1922, as Hata Station (波多駅). The kanji of its name was changed to the present form on 1 May 1956.

== Passenger statistics ==
In fiscal 2016, the station was used by an average of 562 passengers daily (boarding passengers only).

== Surrounding area ==
- former Hata town hall
- Hata Elementary School
- Hata Middle School
- National Route 158

== See also ==
- List of railway stations in Japan
