= Shinano-Arai Station =

Railway station in Matsumoto, Nagano Prefecture, Japan

Shinano-Arai Station 信濃荒井駅
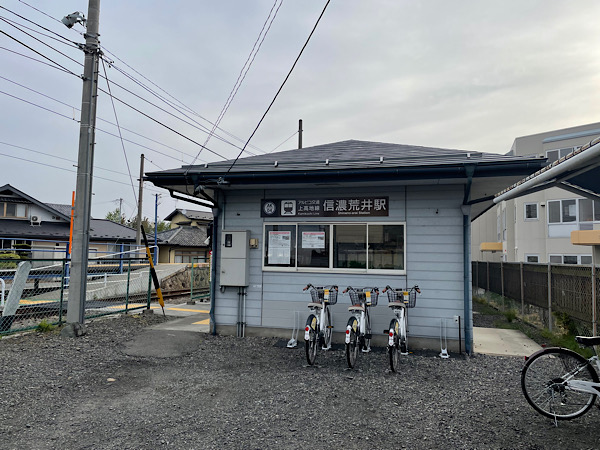
- Shinano-Arai Station in April 2022

General information
- Location: 4417-25 Hata-Moriguchi, Matsumoto-shi, Nagano-ken 390-1401; Japan
- Coordinates: 36°13′44.1″N 137°56′56.47″E
- Operator: Alpico Kōtsū
- Line: ■ Kamikōchi Line
- Distance: 1.9 km from Matsumoto
- Platforms: 1 island platform
- Tracks: 2

Other information
- Station code: AK-04
- Website: Official website

History
- Opened: 2 October 1921

Passengers
- FY2016: 36
Location
- Location within Nagano Prefecture Location within Japan

Shinano-Arai Station (信濃荒井駅, Shinano-Arai-eki) is a railway station in the city of Matsumoto, Nagano, Japan, operated by the private railway operating company Alpico Kōtsū.

== Lines ==
Shinano-Arai Station is a station on the Kamikōchi Line and is 1.9 kilometers from the terminus of the line at Matsumoto Station.

== Station layout ==
The station has one ground-level island platform serving two tracks, connected to the station building by a level crossing.

=== Platforms ===
1	■ Kamikōchi Line	for Niimura, Hata, and Shinshimashima
2	■ Kamikōchi Line	for Matsumoto

== Adjacent stations ==
«	Service	»
Kamikōchi Line
Nagisa	Local	Ōniwa

== History ==
The station opened on 2 October 1921. A new station building was completed in 1993.

== Passenger statistics ==
In fiscal 2016, the station was used by an average of 36 passengers daily (boarding passengers only).

== Surrounding area ==
- National Route 158

== See also ==
- List of railway stations in Japan
