= Nagisa Station (Nagano) =

Railway station in Matsumoto, Nagano Prefecture, Japan

Nagisa Station 渚駅
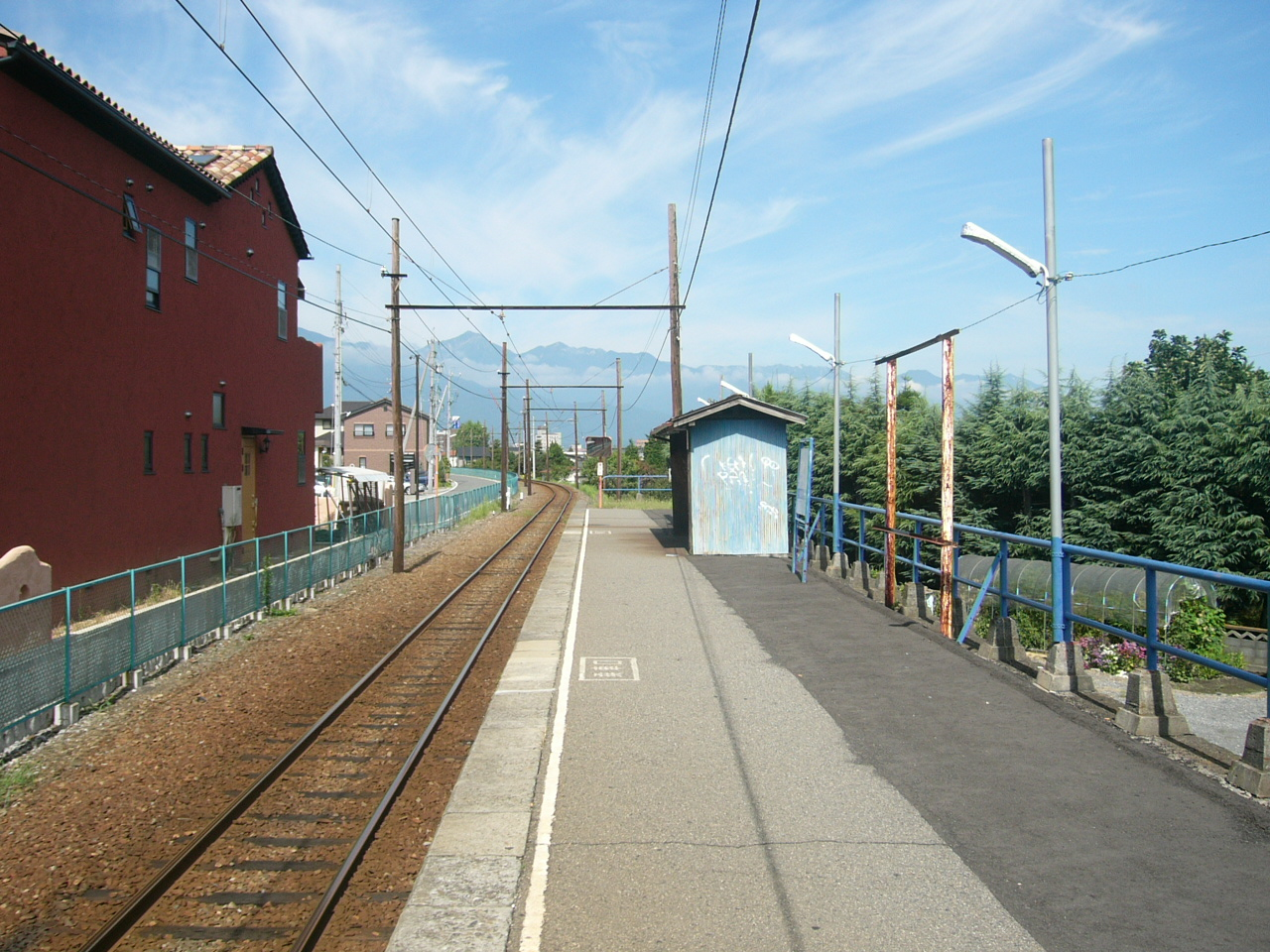
- Nagisa Station in September 2006

General information
- Location: 3-9-42 Nagisa, Matsumoto-shi, Nagano-ken 390-0841; Japan
- Coordinates: 36°13′37.67″N 137°57′22.53″E
- Operator: Alpico Kōtsū
- Line: ■ Kamikōchi Line
- Distance: 1.1 km from Matsumoto
- Platforms: 1 side platform
- Tracks: 1

Other information
- Station code: AK-03
- Website: Official website

History
- Opened: 3 May 1922
- Former names: Nishi-Matsumoto Station (to 1927)

Passengers
- FY2016: 77
Location
- Location within Nagano Prefecture Location within Japan

Nagisa Station (渚駅, Nagisa-eki) is a railway station in the city of Matsumoto, Nagano, Japan, operated by the private railway operating company Alpico Kōtsū.

== Lines ==
Nagisa Station is a station on the Kamikōchi Line and is 1.1 kilometers from the terminus of the line at Matsumoto Station.

== Station layout ==
The station has one ground-level side platform serving a single bi-directional track.

== Adjacent stations ==
«	Service	»
Kamikōchi Line
Nishi-Matsumoto	Local	Shinano-Arai

== History ==
The station opened on 3 May 1922 as Nishi-Matsumoto Station (西松本駅). It was renamed to its present name on 1 May 1927.

== Passenger statistics ==
In fiscal 2016, the station was used by an average of 77 passengers daily (boarding passengers only).

== Surrounding area ==
- Nagisa Post office
- National Route 19
- National Route 158

== See also ==
- List of railway stations in Japan
