= Moriguchi Station =

Moriguchi Station is the name of two train stations in Japan:

- Moriguchi Station (Nagano) (森口駅)
- Moriguchi Station (Osaka) (守口駅)
