= Endō Station =

Railway station in Matsumoto, Nagano Prefecture, Japan

Endō Station 渕東駅
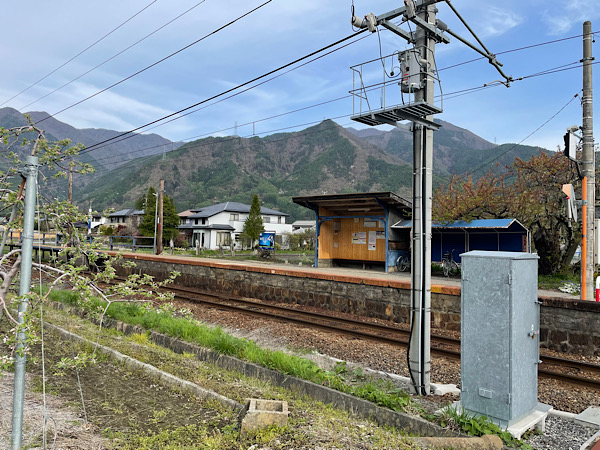
- Endō Station in April 2022

General information
- Location: 4207 Hata, Matsumoto-shi, Nagano-ken 390-1401; Japan
- Coordinates: 36°11′42.62″N 137°50′23.68″E
- Operator: Alpico Kōtsū
- Line: ■ Kamikōchi Line
- Distance: 12.7 km from Matsumoto
- Platforms: 1 side platform
- Tracks: 1

Other information
- Station code: AK-13
- Website: Official website

History
- Opened: 26 September 1922

Passengers
- FY2016: 27
Location
- Location within Nagano Prefecture Location within Japan

Endō Station (渕東駅, Endō-eki) is a railway station in the city of Matsumoto, Nagano, Japan, operated by the private railway operating company Alpico Kōtsū.

== Lines ==
Endō Station is on the Kamikōchi Line and is 12.7 kilometers from the opposing terminus of the line at Matsumoto Station.

== Station layout ==
The station has one ground-level side platform serving one bi-directional track. The station is not attended.

== Adjacent stations ==
«	Service	»
Kamikōchi Line
Hata	Local	Shinshimashima

== History ==
The station opened on 26 September 1922.

== Passenger statistics ==
In fiscal 2016, the station was used by an average of 27 passengers daily (boarding passengers only).

== Surrounding area ==
- Hata Jinja
- National Route 158

== See also ==
- List of railway stations in Japan
