= Kamikōchi =

Highland valley in Chūbu region, Japan

Coordinates: 36°14′49″N 137°38′00″E

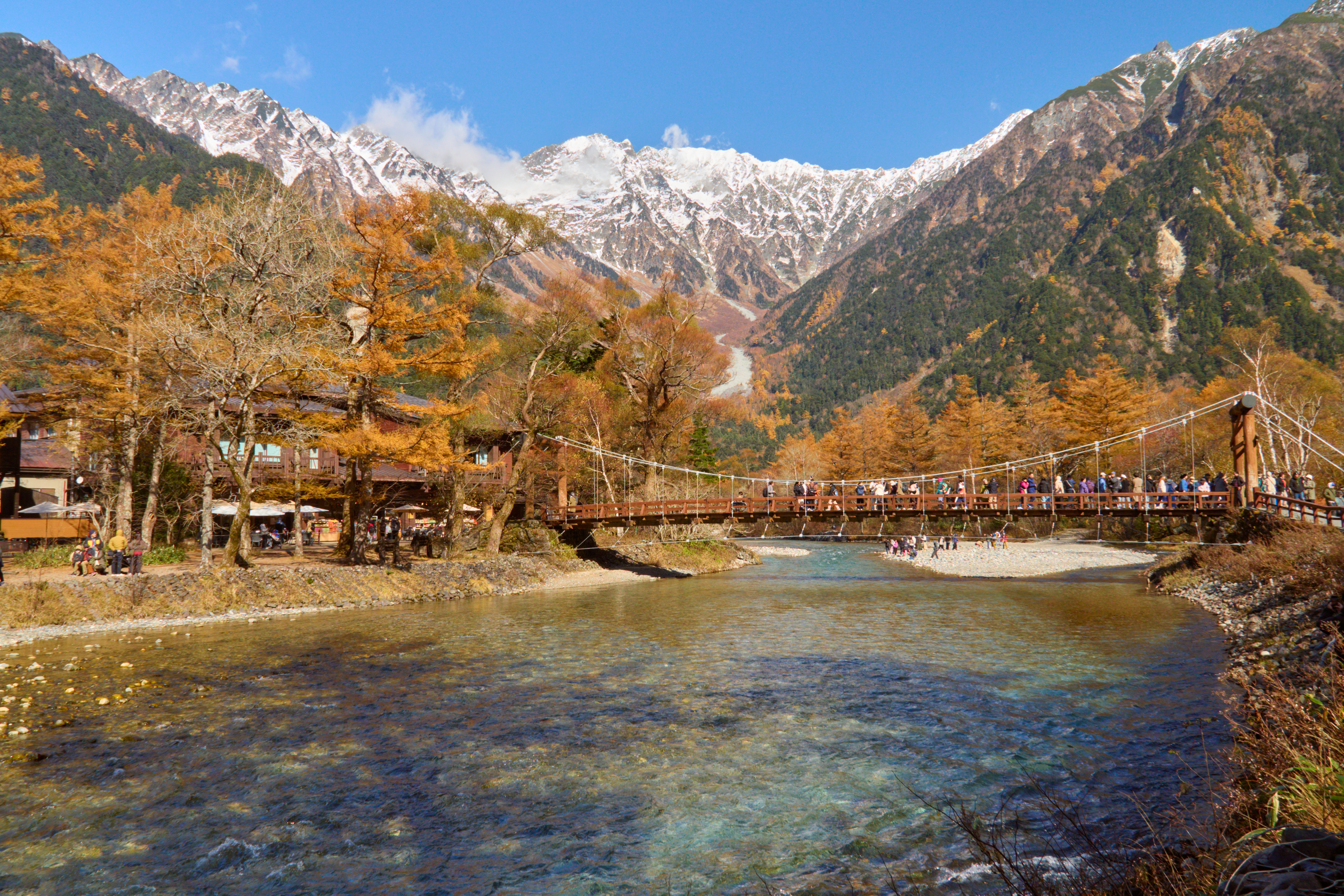
Kappa Bridge over the Azusa River at Kamikochi, with the Hotaka mountain range visible behind autumn larches.

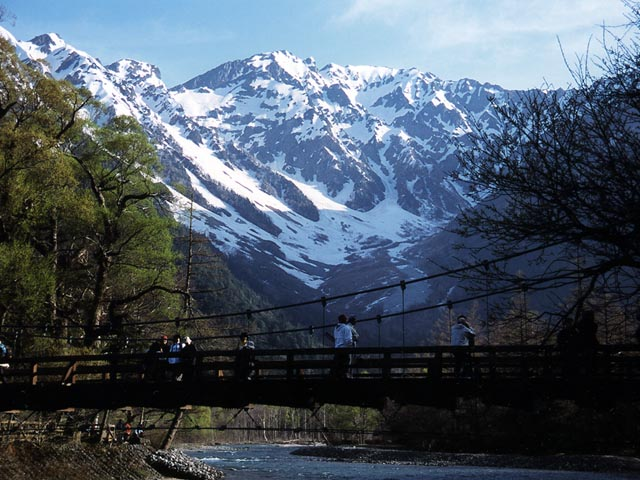
Mt. Hotaka and the Kappa-bashi

Kamikōchi (Japanese: 上高地; lit. Upper Highlands) is a remote mountainous highland valley within the Hida Mountains range, in the western region of Nagano Prefecture, Japan.

It has been preserved in its natural state within Chūbu-Sangaku National Park. It is designated as one of Japan's National Cultural Assets, on the list of Special Natural Monuments and Special Places of Scenic Beauty. It is sometimes referred to as the "Japanese Yosemite Valley," although it is considerably smaller than its Californian counterpart.

== Geography ==
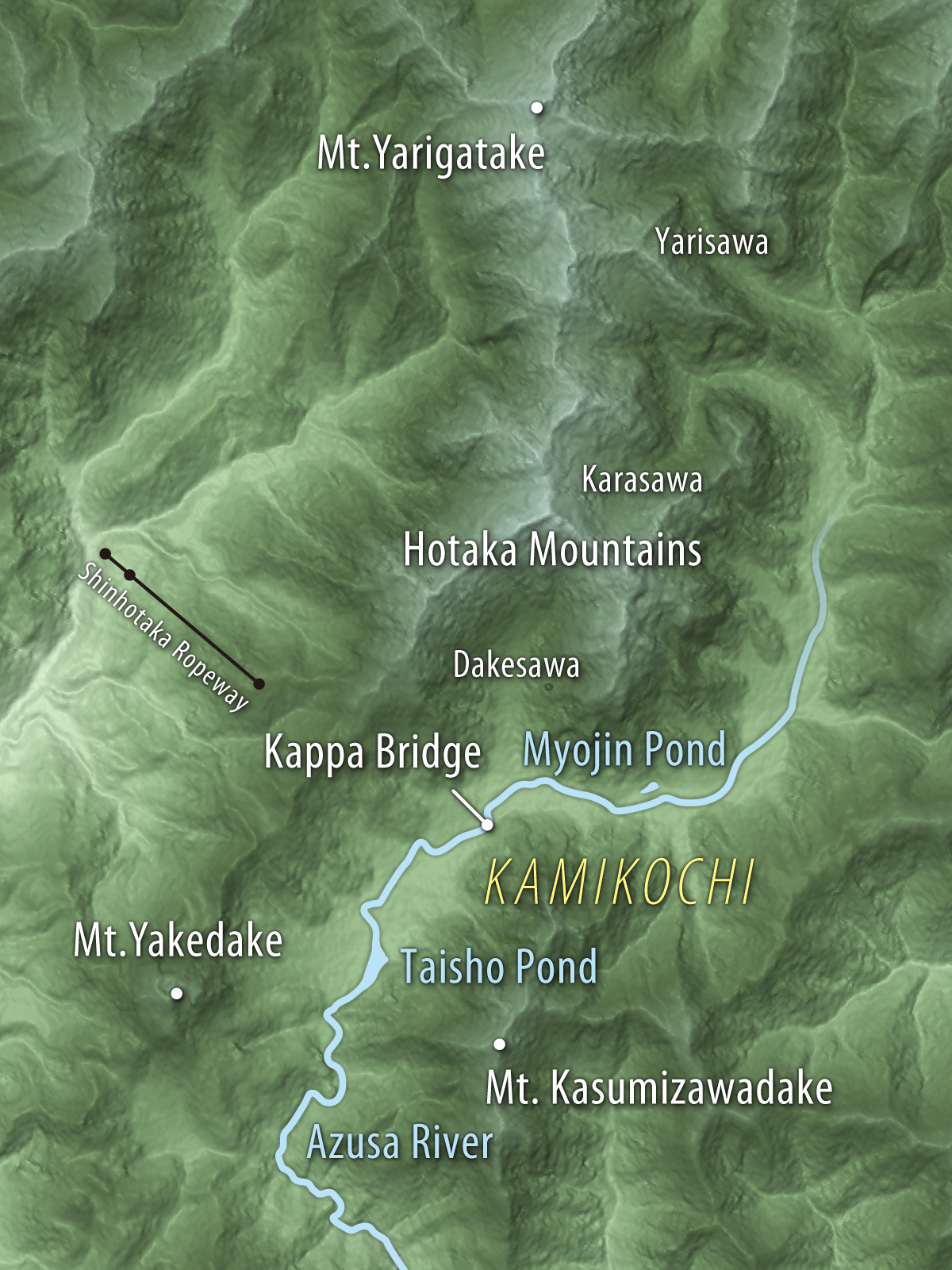
Map

Kamikōchi is a high mountain valley approximately 18 kilometers in length. The average elevation of the valley floor ranges between roughly 1,400 m (4,600 ft) above sea level at the south end and roughly 1,600 m (5,200 ft) at the northern tip.

Kamikōchi is located in the Hida Mountains, the "Northern Alps" of the Japanese Alps. The surrounding mountains reach 3,190 m (10,470 ft). Kamikōchi is bordered on its northern end by Mount Hotaka, and on its southern end by Mount Yake, an active volcano.

The Azusa River, the headwater of Japan's longest river, the Shinano River, flows the length of the valley, filling Lake Taishō at the base of Mt. Yake. Lake Taishō received its name because it was formed by the eruption of Mt. Yake in 1915, which was part of the Taishō period in Japan.

Because of the relatively flat topography of the Kamikochi Valley, marshes and ponds are a common feature, including the Takezawa Marsh, Tashiro Pond, and Myojin Pond. Because the water mainly comes from melted snow runoff or underground aquifers, it remains cold, even in the height of summer. The Tokusawa area at the far northern end of the valley served as a grazing area for horses and cattle until 1934, when the area was completely integrated into the park.

== Hiking ==
Kamikochi is a very popular hiking destination; there are many mountain huts and camping sites that make overnight hiking easy. The most famous hike in the area is Yarigatake, which is easily accessible from Kamikochi and often combined with Oku-Hotaka as a multi-day hike.

== History ==
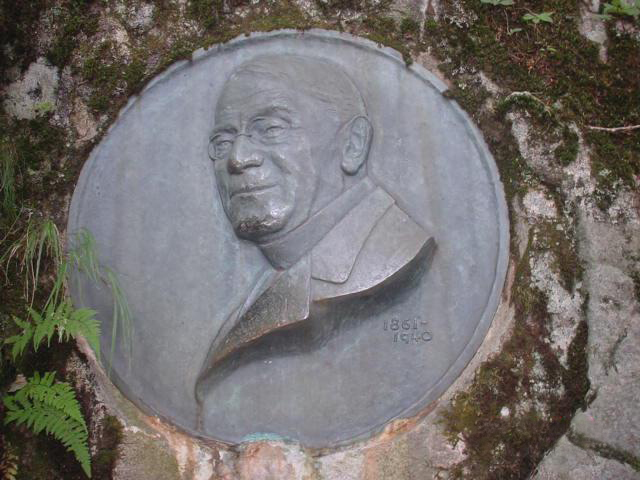
Commemorative plaque dedicated to Rev. Walter Weston, a leader in the effort to preserve Kamikōchi as a designated national park

Kamikōchi was logged extensively until the mid-19th Century. The Rev. Walter Weston, a British Anglican missionary, is credited with, through his writing, sparking interest in recreational mountaineering in Japan and with lobbying to preserve the Kamikōchi area. Each year in June, the Weston Festival is celebrated at Kamikochi in recognition of his contribution to the conservation of the Northern Japan Alps.

Japanese novelist Ryunosuke Akutagawa also contributed to a boom in domestic tourism when he published his book Kappa in 1927. The name "Kappa-Bashi," the narrow pedestrian suspension bridge over the Azusa River mentioned in the novel, predates the book's publication. The origin of the bridge's name is uncertain. Still, it is more commonly thought to refer to Kappa, mythical water deities said to inhabit Japan's mountain streams and rivers.

kanji 神垣内 (Kami-ko-uchi) were also used to write "Kamikōchi," but 上高地 (Kami-kō-chi) has become the common way to write the name.

Park facilities include two camping areas, several hotels (western-style and traditional Japanese ryokan), a post office, a tourist information center, and some souvenir shops, mainly located between the bus and taxi terminal and Kappa-bashi bridge.

== Access and transportation ==
As the entire Kamikochi valley is protected as part of the Chūbu-Sangaku National Park, road access is only granted to shuttle buses, taxis, and forestry and maintenance workers' vehicles. Private vehicles have been restricted from entering the park beyond the Kama Tunnel for both traffic management and environmental reasons since 1994. Private cars are required to park at either the Hirayu or Sawando parking area, from where shuttle buses or taxis transport visitors directly to the centrally located park visitor center.

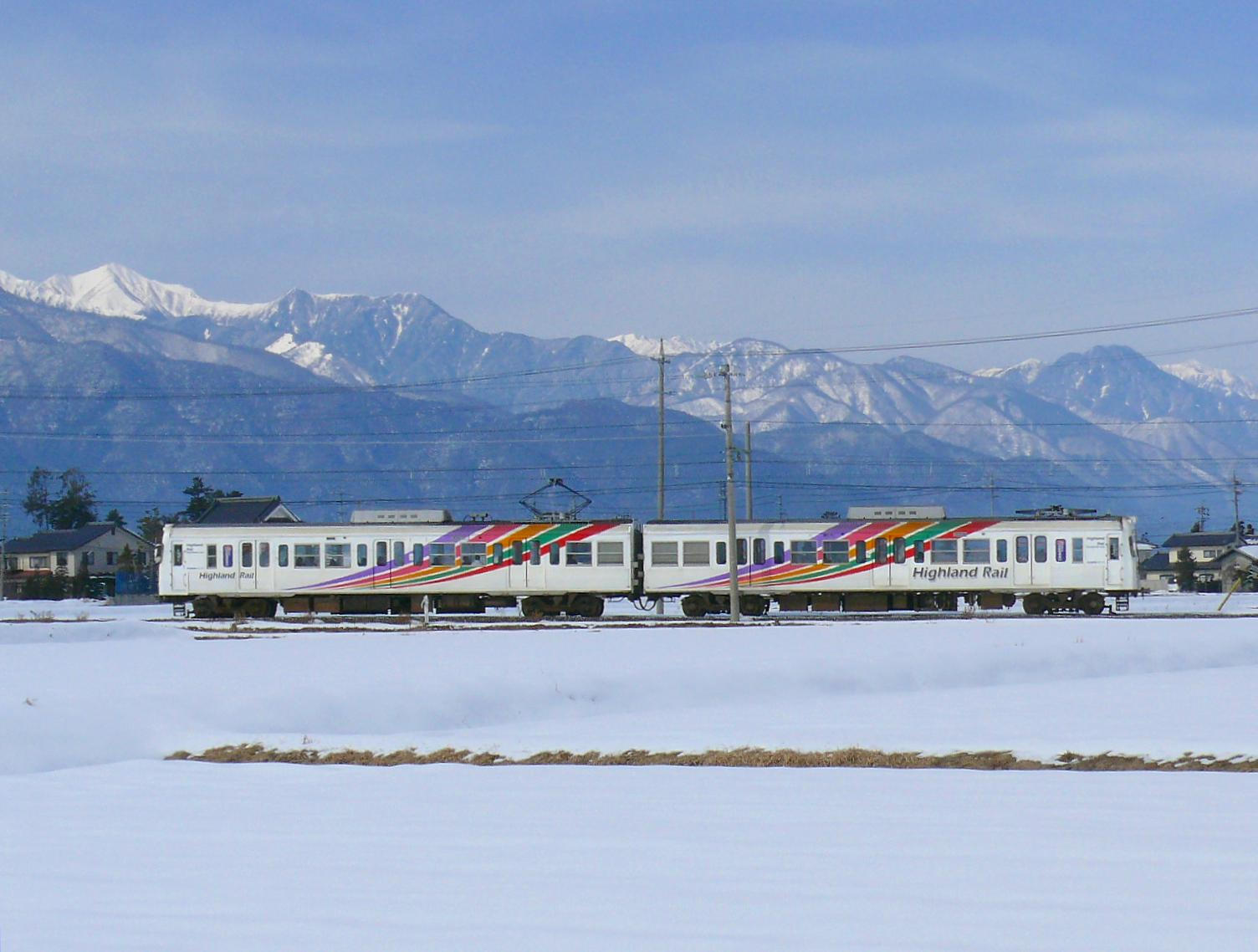
Highland Rail train on the Kamikōchi Line

For rail passengers approaching from Matsumoto, an integrated park transportation ticket is available using the Highland Rail service of the Kamikōchi Line to Shin-Shimashima rail terminal and then the Highland Bus service provided by Alpico Kōtsū. The journey to the center of the park from Matsumoto Station by rail and shuttle bus takes approximately 1 hour and 50 minutes.

Longer distance and overnight buses directly to the park are available from Tokyo (Shinjuku), Nagoya, Kyoto, and Osaka.

The park is officially open from mid-April to mid-November, with peak crowds during the summer school holidays (end of July through the end of August) and when the autumn leaves are at their peak in October.

== Surrounding mountains ==
- Mount Hotaka
- Mount Yari
- Mount Yake
- Mount Chō
- Mount Jōnen
- Mount Kasumizawa
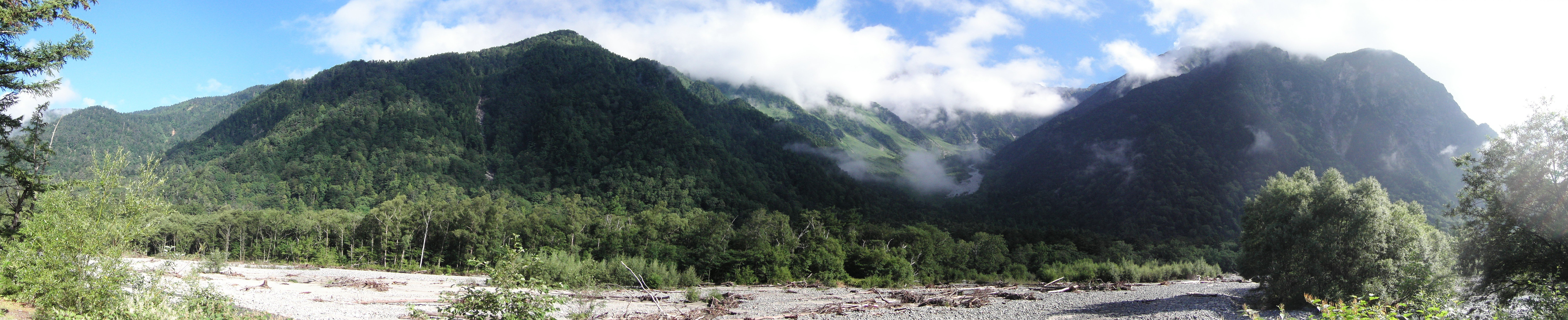
Panoramic view of the central Kamikōchi Valley, facing Mt. Hotaka
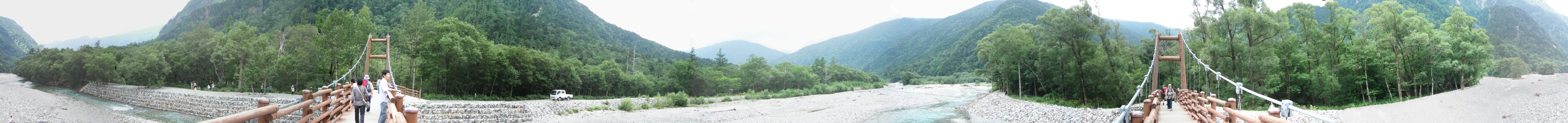
Panoramic view of the central Kamikōchi Valley, around Lake Myōjin
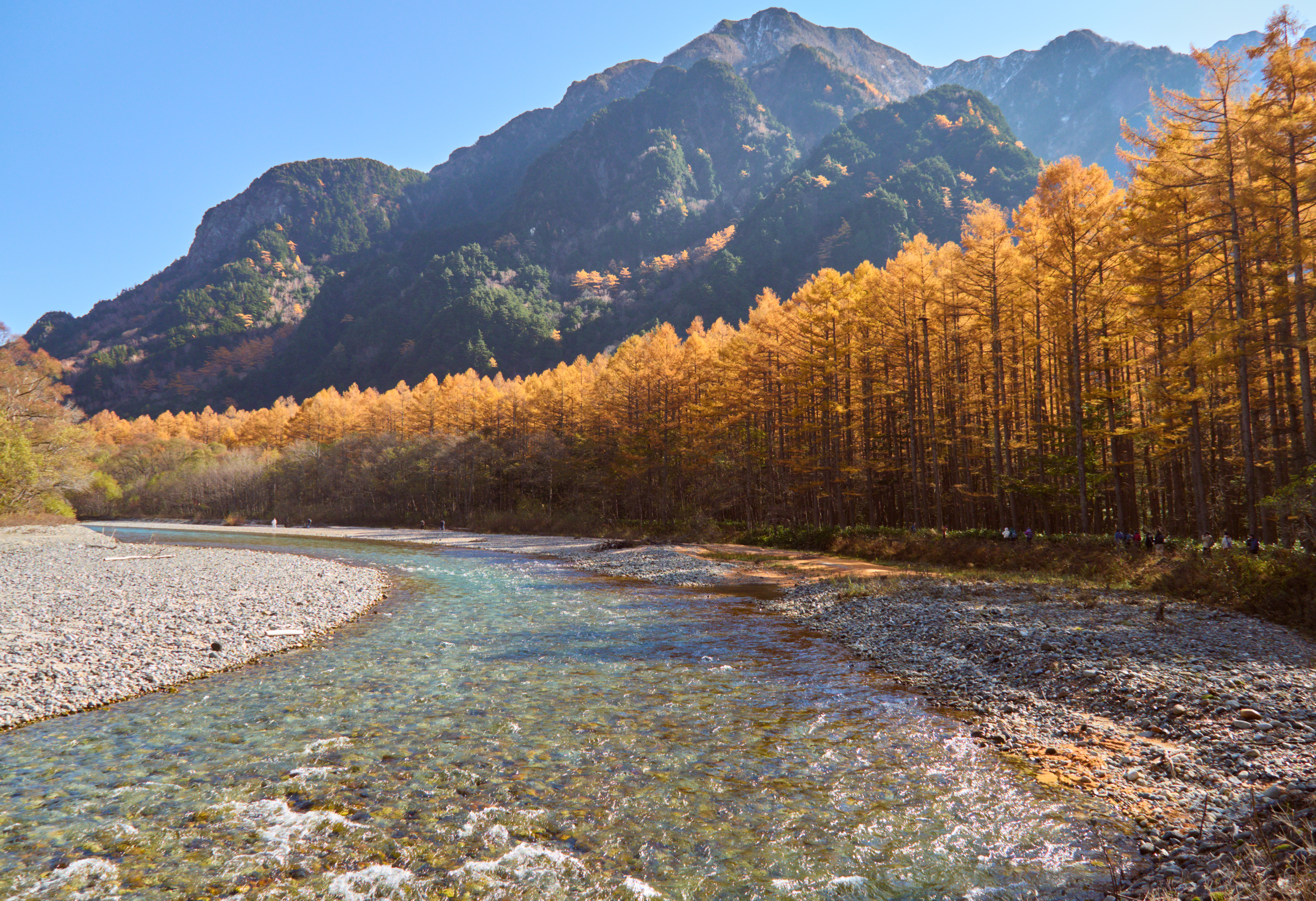
The Azusa River flowing through Kamikochi valley, with larch trees in autumn foliage and a mountain peak behind.

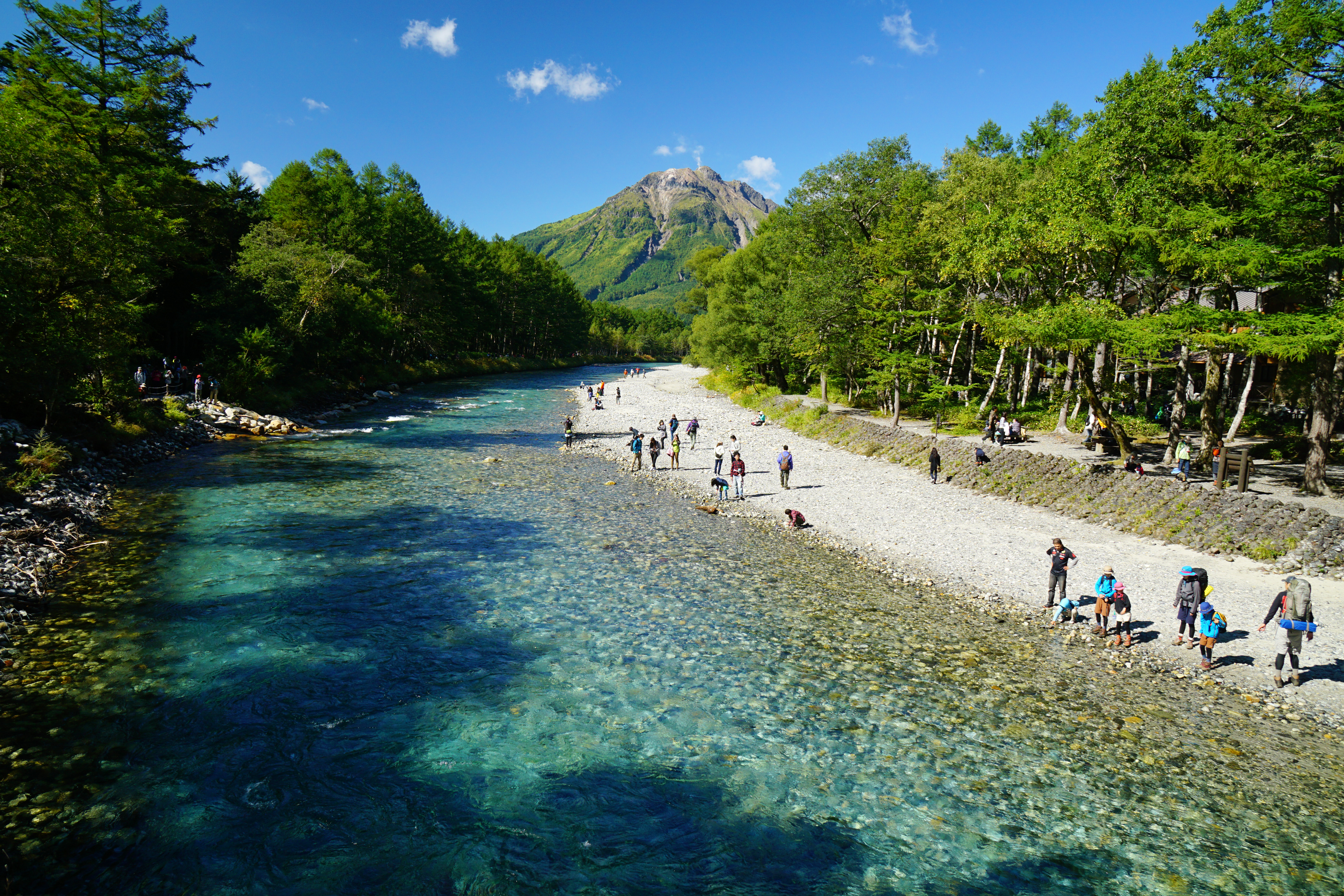
Azusa River flows through Kamikōchi

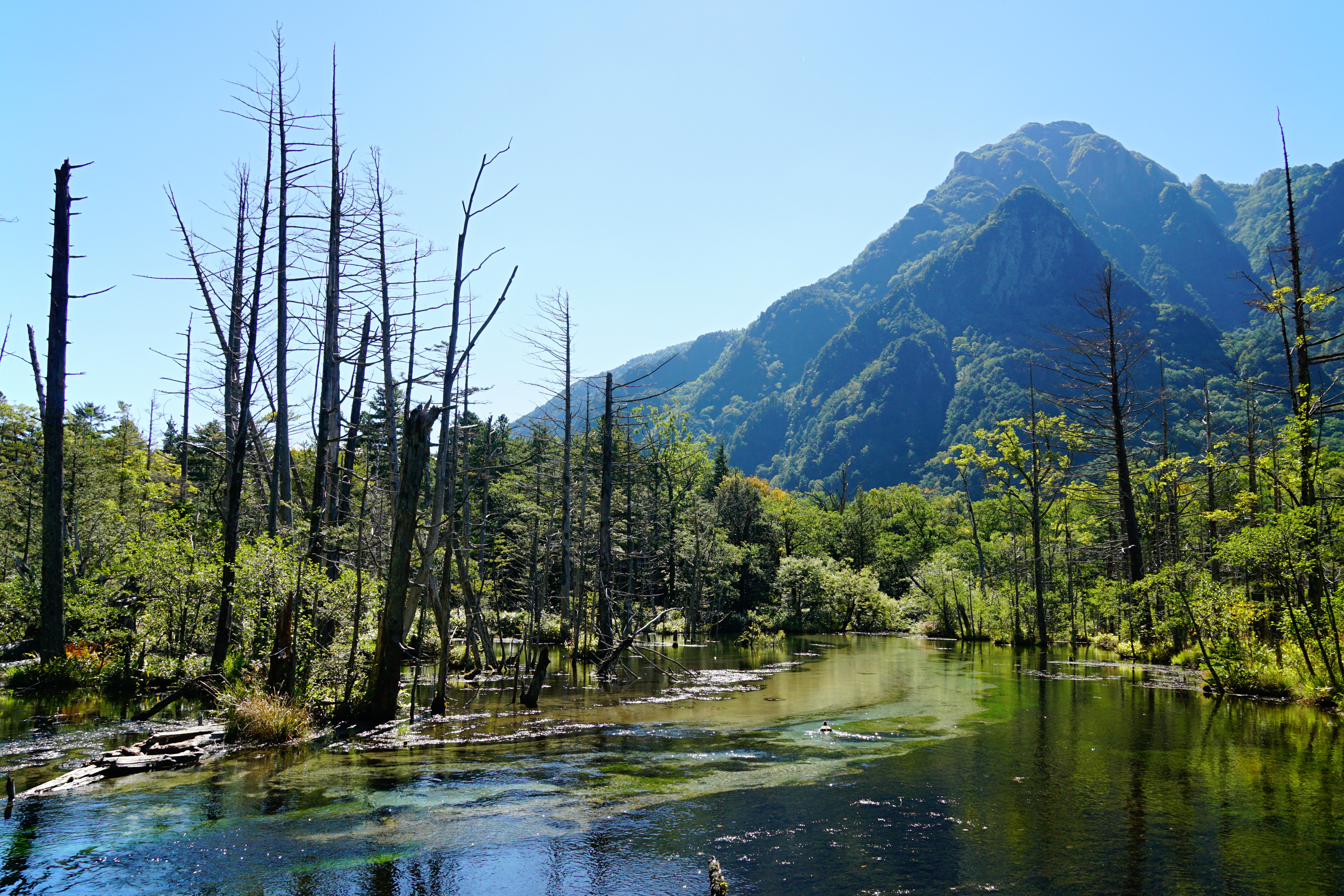
Gakusawa wetlands

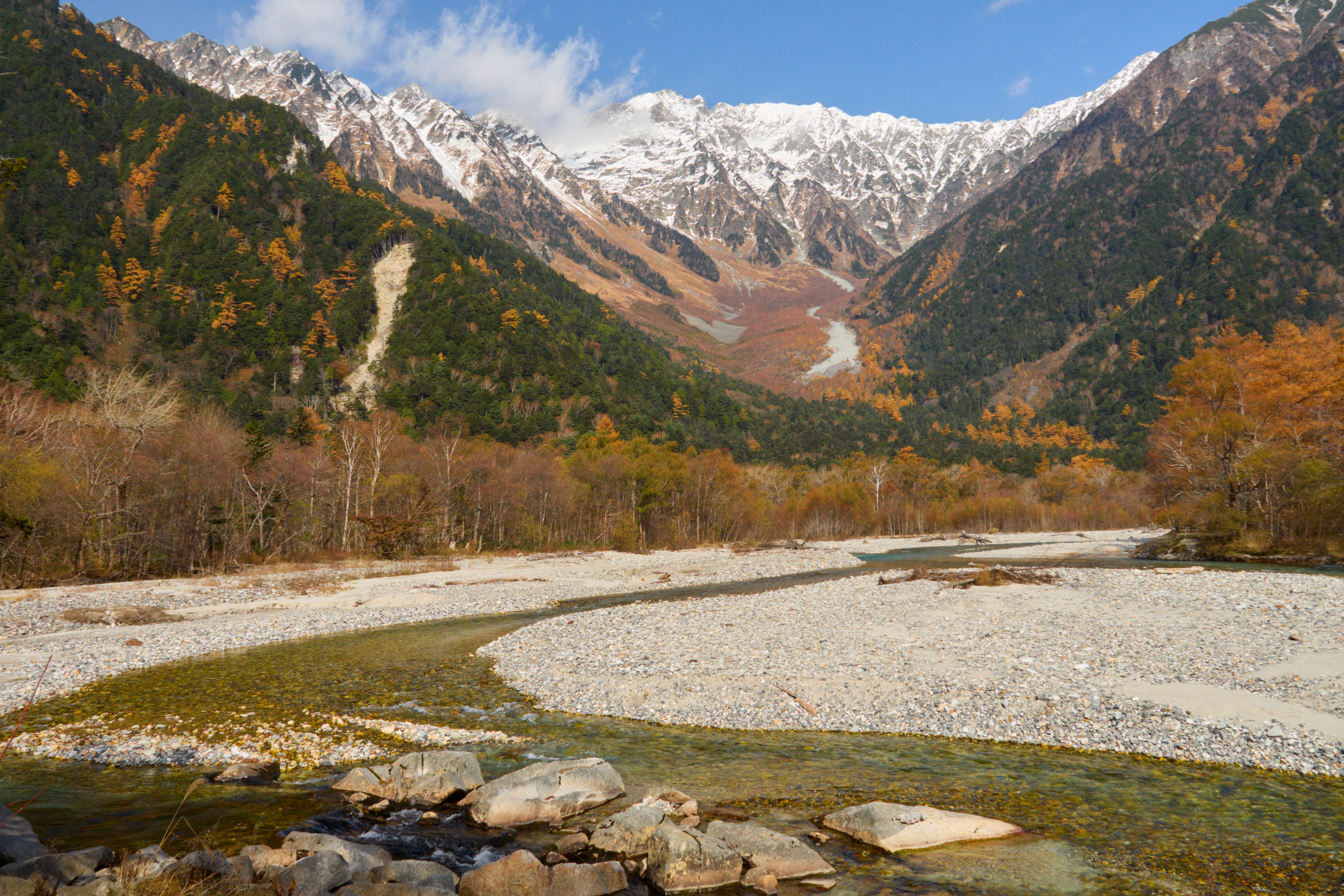
Kamikochi in autumn.

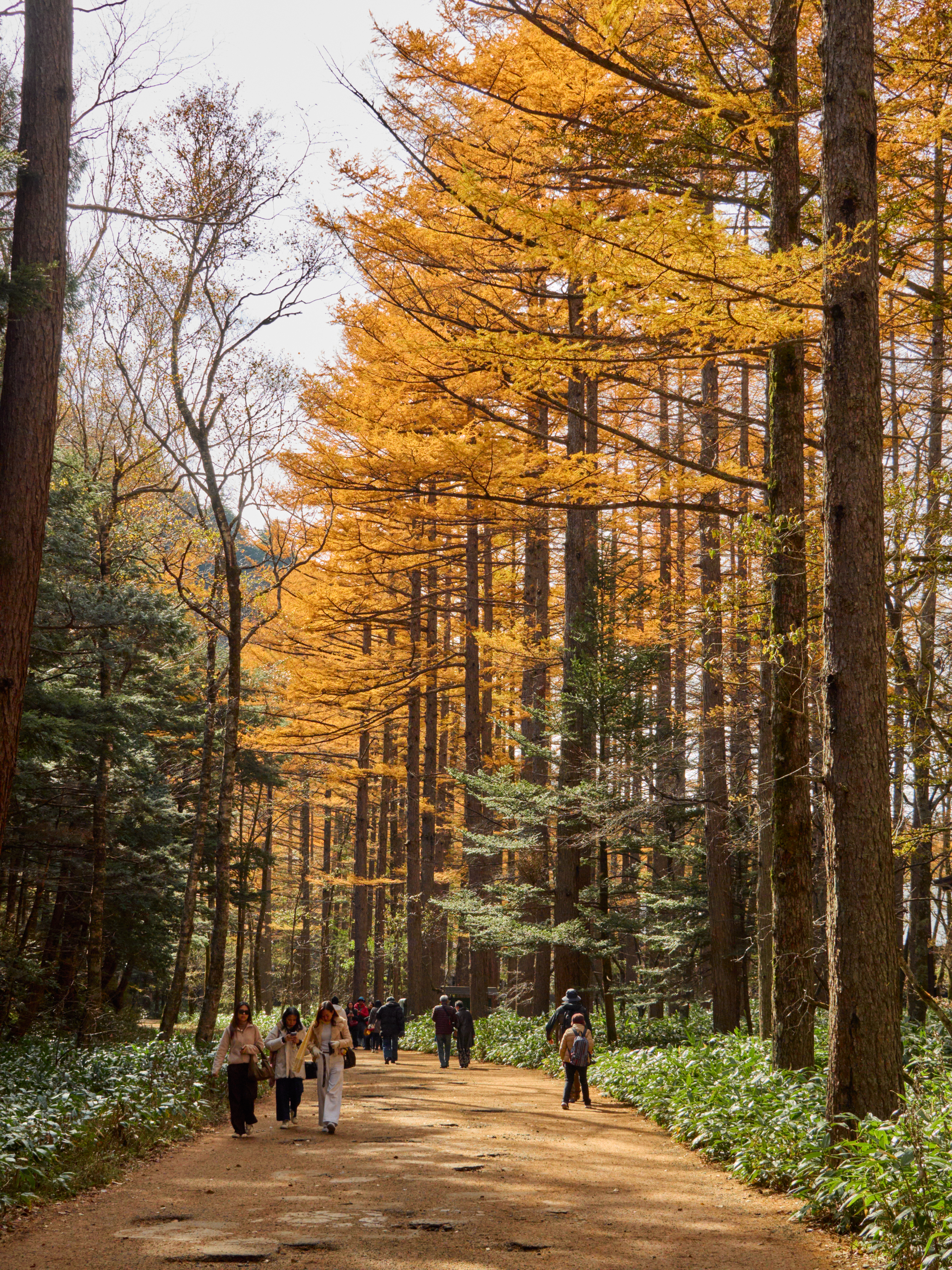
Tall larch trees, autumn foliage at Kamikochi.

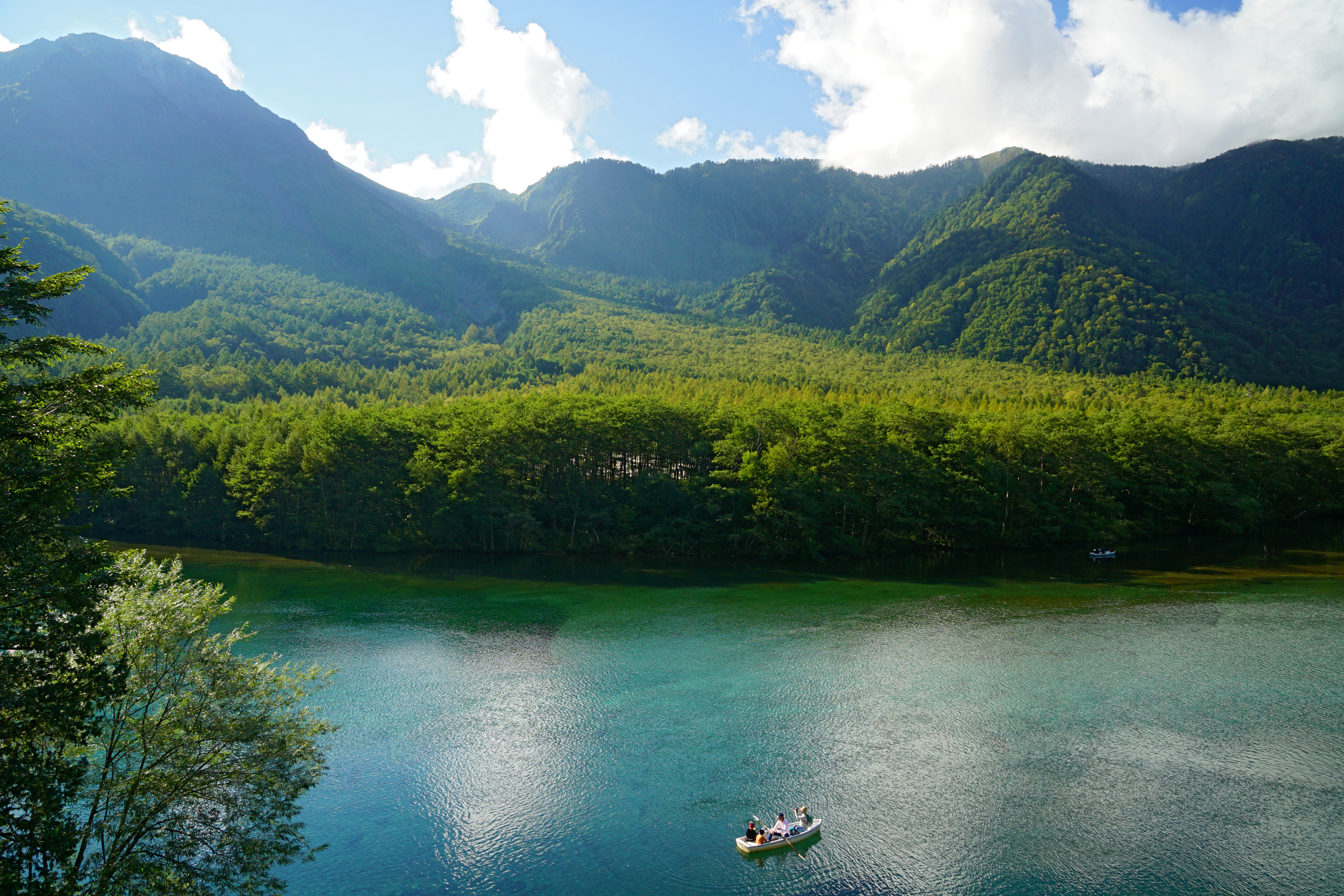
Lake Taisho

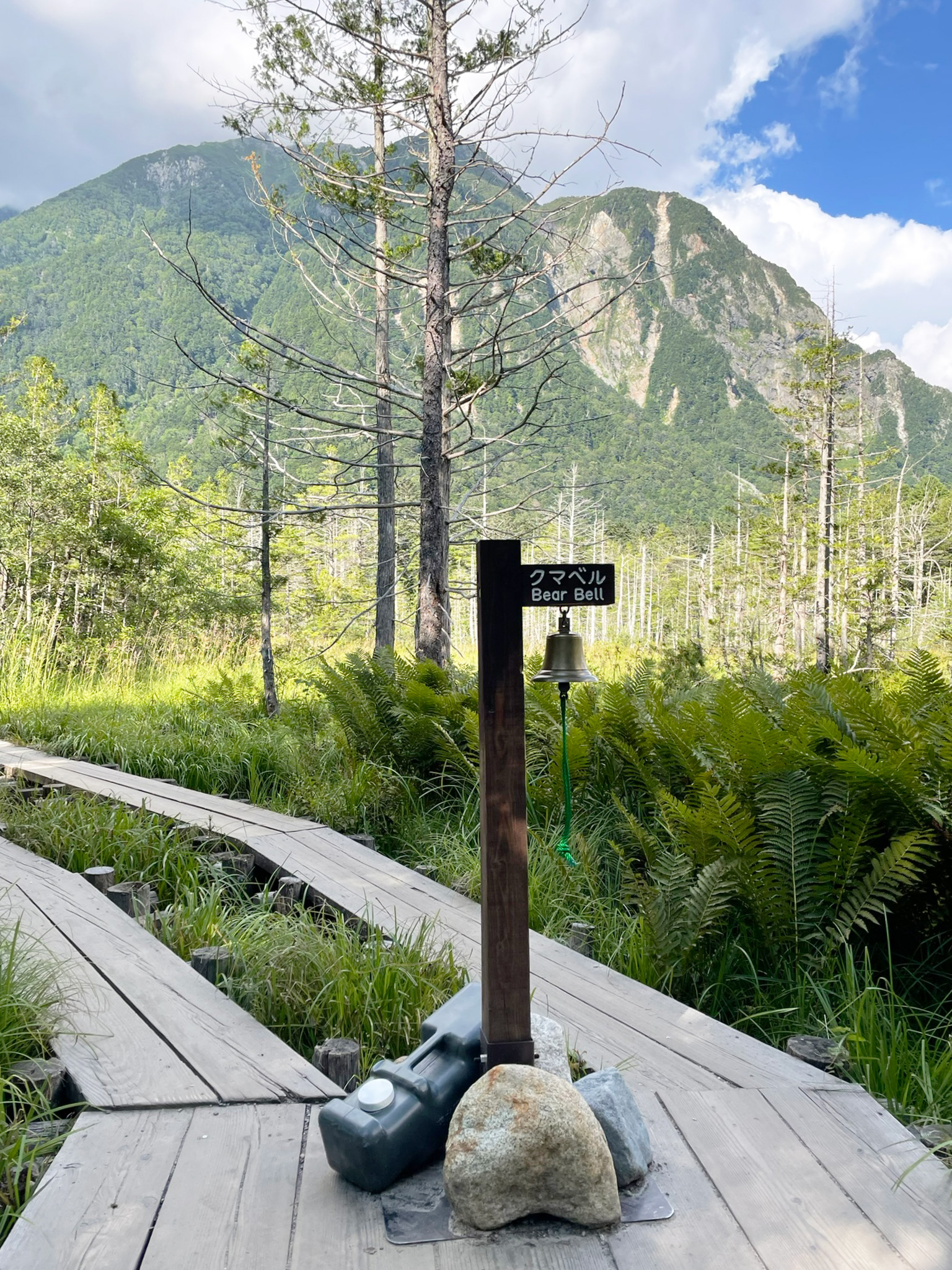
Bear Bell

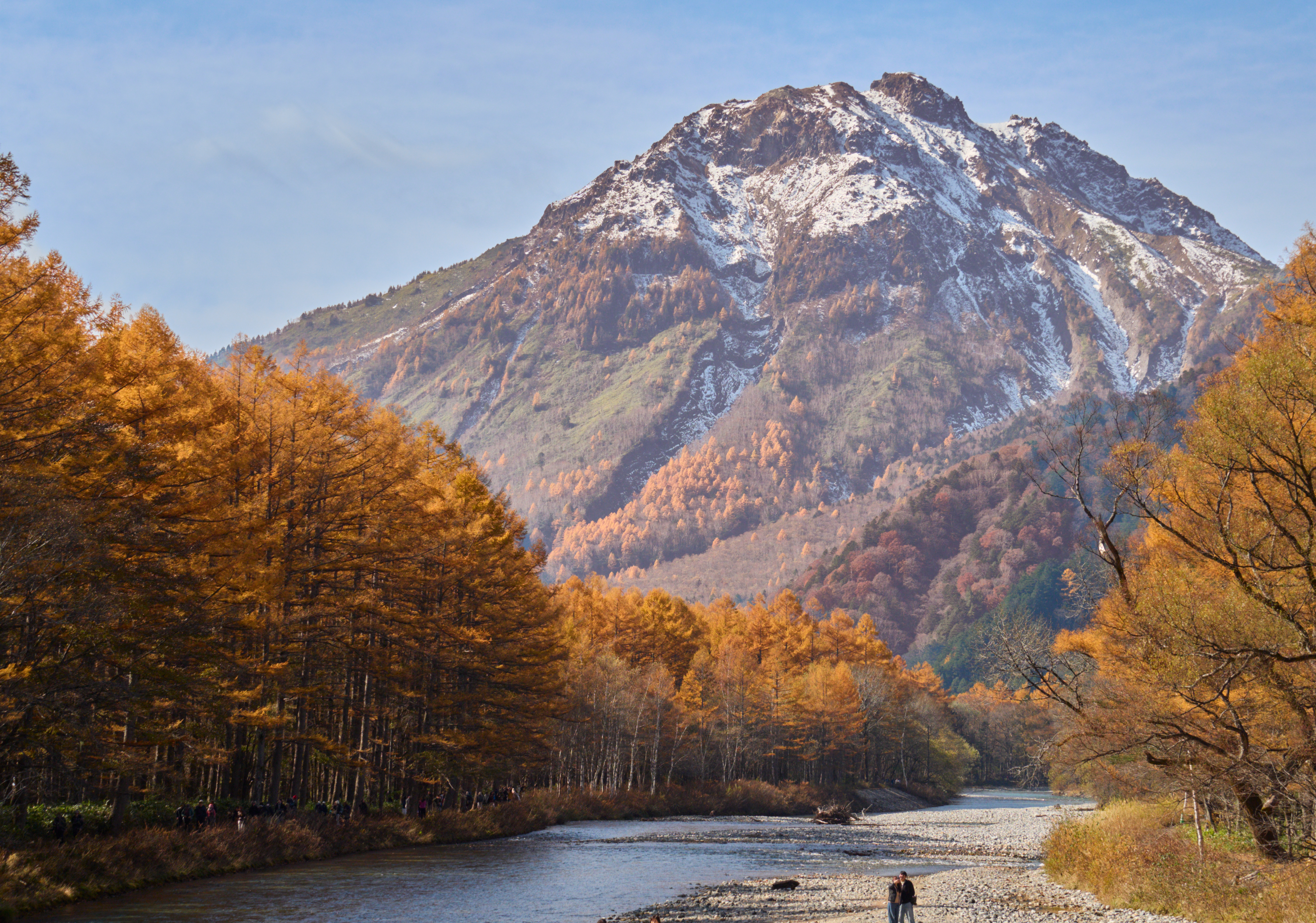
The Azusa River flowing through Kamikochi valley, flanked by autumn larch forests with a snow-dusted peak behind.

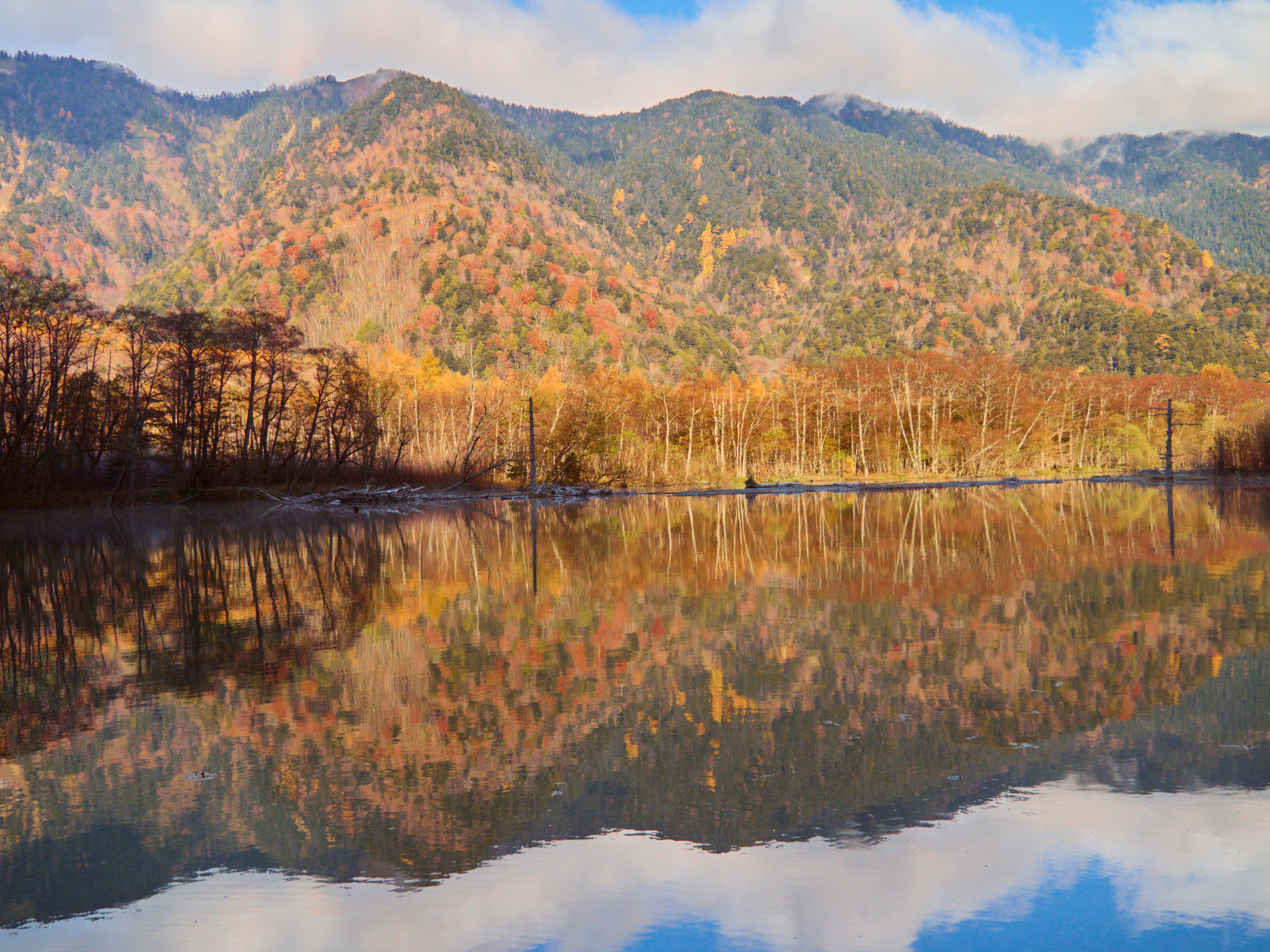
Taisho Pond in Kamikochi reflecting autumn foliage and the surrounding mountains.

A Japanese macaque mother and her offspring

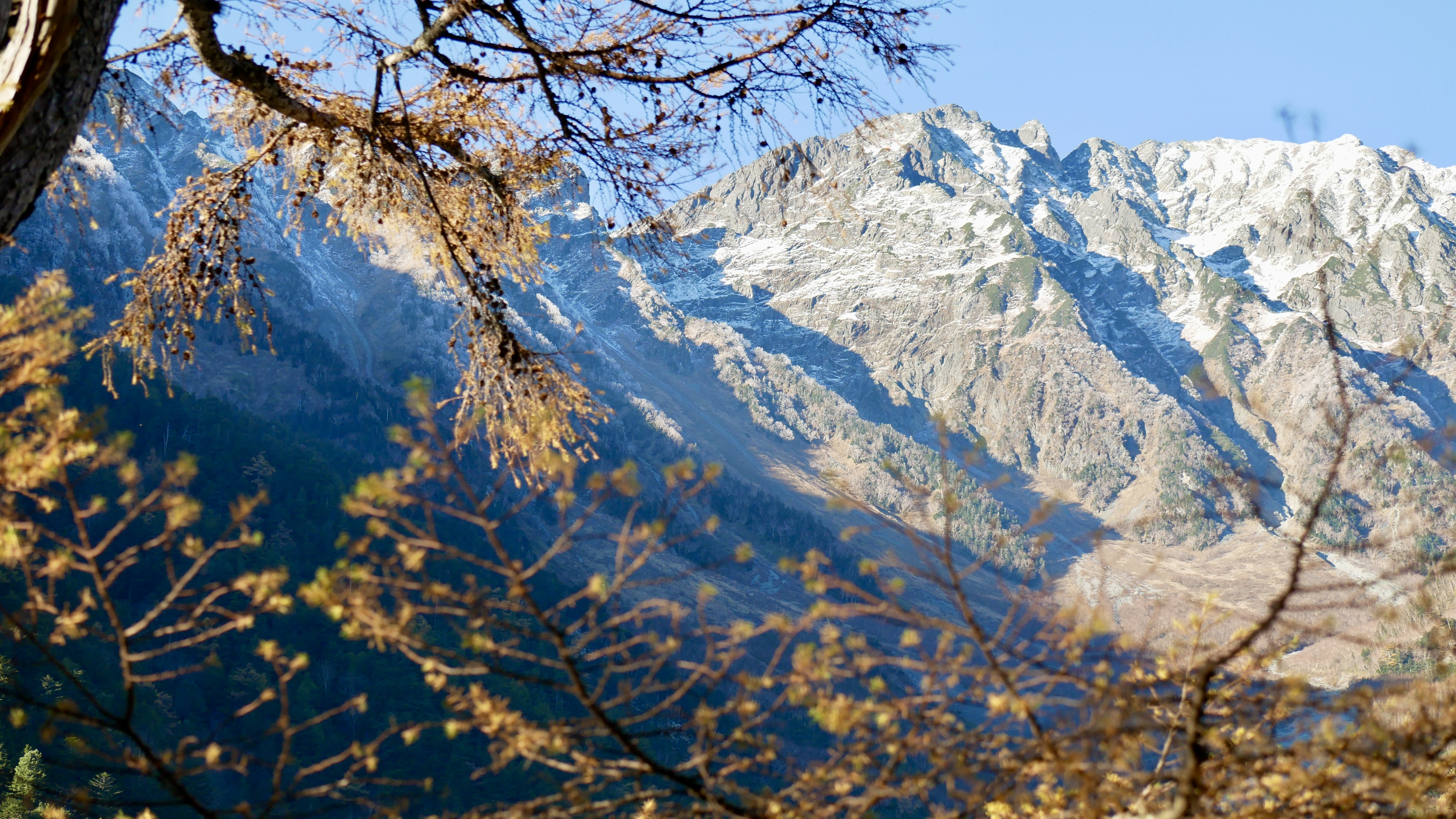
Mountains in Kamikōchi Valley

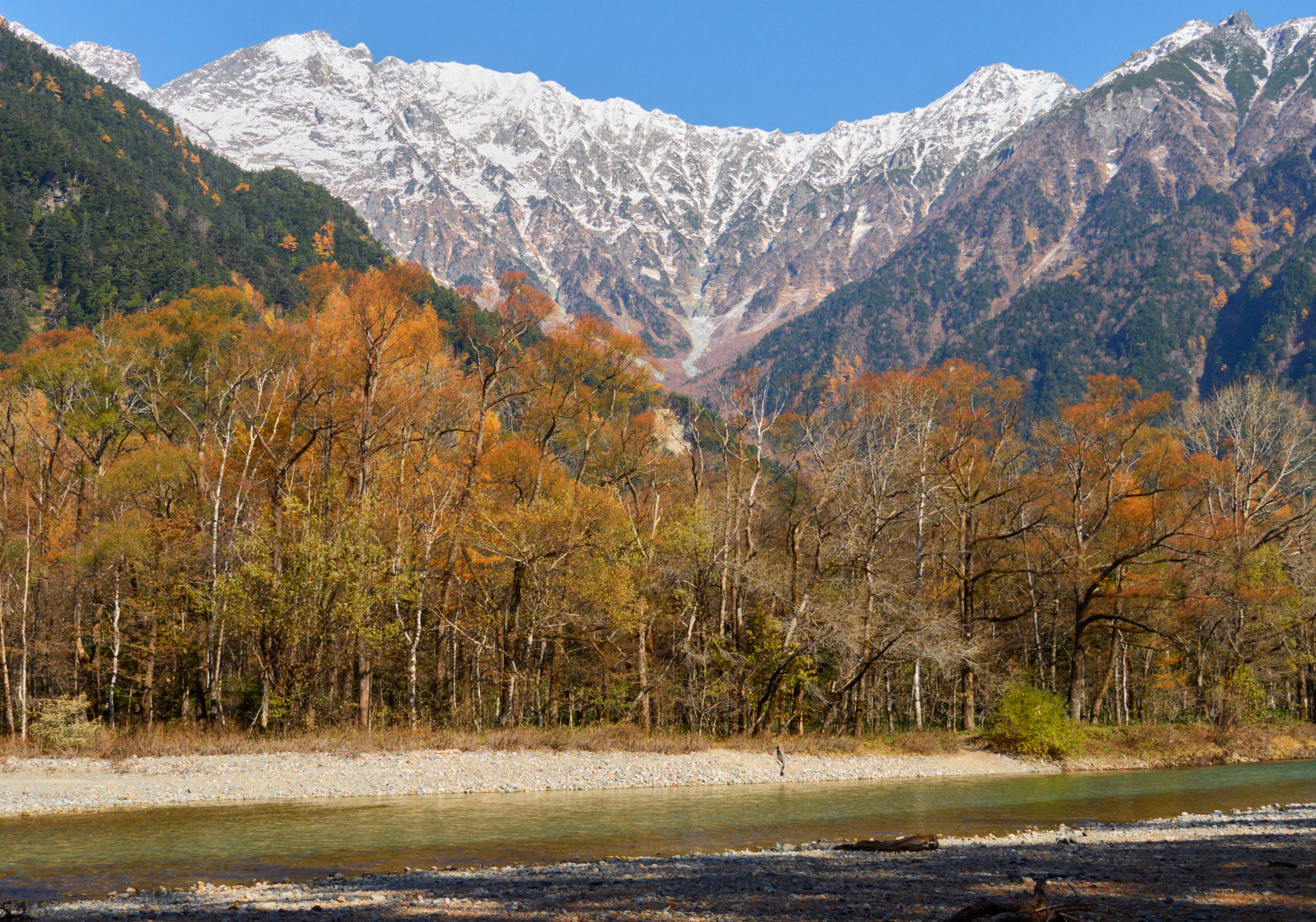
Azusa River, golden larches in autumn, and Hotaka mountains.

== See also ==
- Chūbu-Sangaku National Park
- List of Special Places of Scenic Beauty, Special Historic Sites and Special Natural Monuments
- Tourism in Japan
