= Nishi-Matsumoto Station =

Railway station in Matsumoto, Nagano Prefecture, Japan

Nishi-Matsumoto Station 西松本駅
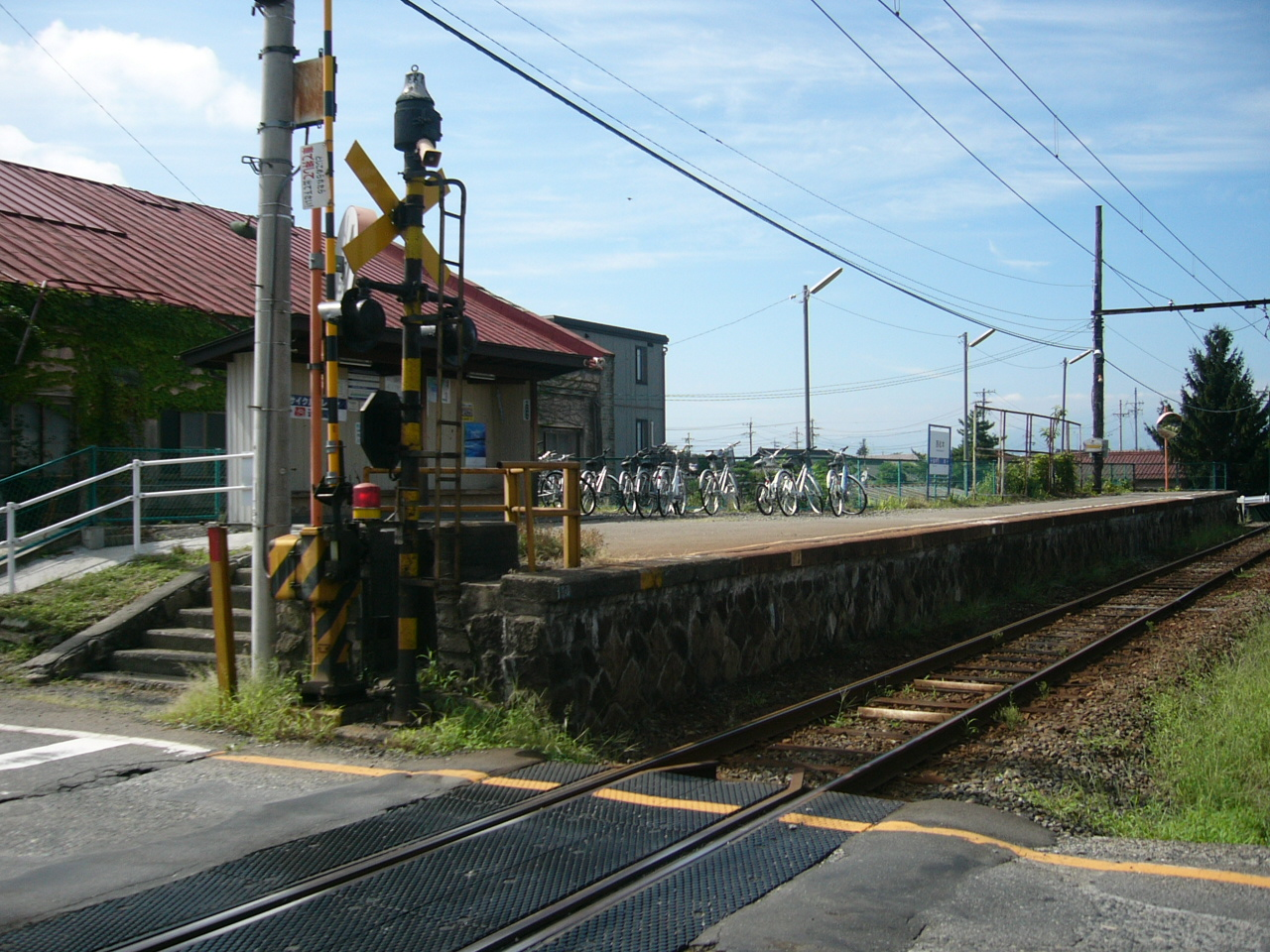
- Nishi-Matsumoto Station in September 2006

General information
- Location: 3-15 Nakajo, Matsumoto-shi, Nagano-ken 390-081; Japan
- Coordinates: 36°13′37.66″N 137°57′48.37″E
- Operator: Alpico Kōtsū
- Line: ■ Kamikōchi Line
- Distance: 0.4 km from Matsumoto
- Platforms: 1 side platform
- Tracks: 1

Other information
- Station code: AK-02
- Website: Official website

History
- Opened: 1 May 1927

Passengers
- FY2016: 55
Location
- Location within Nagano Prefecture Location within Japan

Nishi-Matsumoto Station (西松本駅, Nishi-Matsumoto-eki) is a railway station in the city of Matsumoto, Nagano, Japan, operated by the private railway operating company Alpico Kōtsū.

== Lines ==
Nishi-Matsumoto Station is a station on the Kamikōchi Line and is 0.4 kilometers from the terminus of the line at Matsumoto Station.

== Station layout ==
The station has one ground-level side platform serving a single bi-directional track. The station is unattended.

== Adjacent stations ==
«	Service	»
Kamikōchi Line
Matsumoto	Local	Nagisa

== History ==
The station opened on 1 May 1927.

== Passenger statistics ==
In fiscal 2016, the station was used by an average of 201 passengers daily (boarding passengers only).

== Surrounding area ==
- Matsumoto Kyoritsu Hospital
- National Route 19

== See also ==
- List of railway stations in Japan
