= Niimura Station =

Railway station in Matsumoto, Nagano Prefecture, Japan

Niimura Station 新村駅
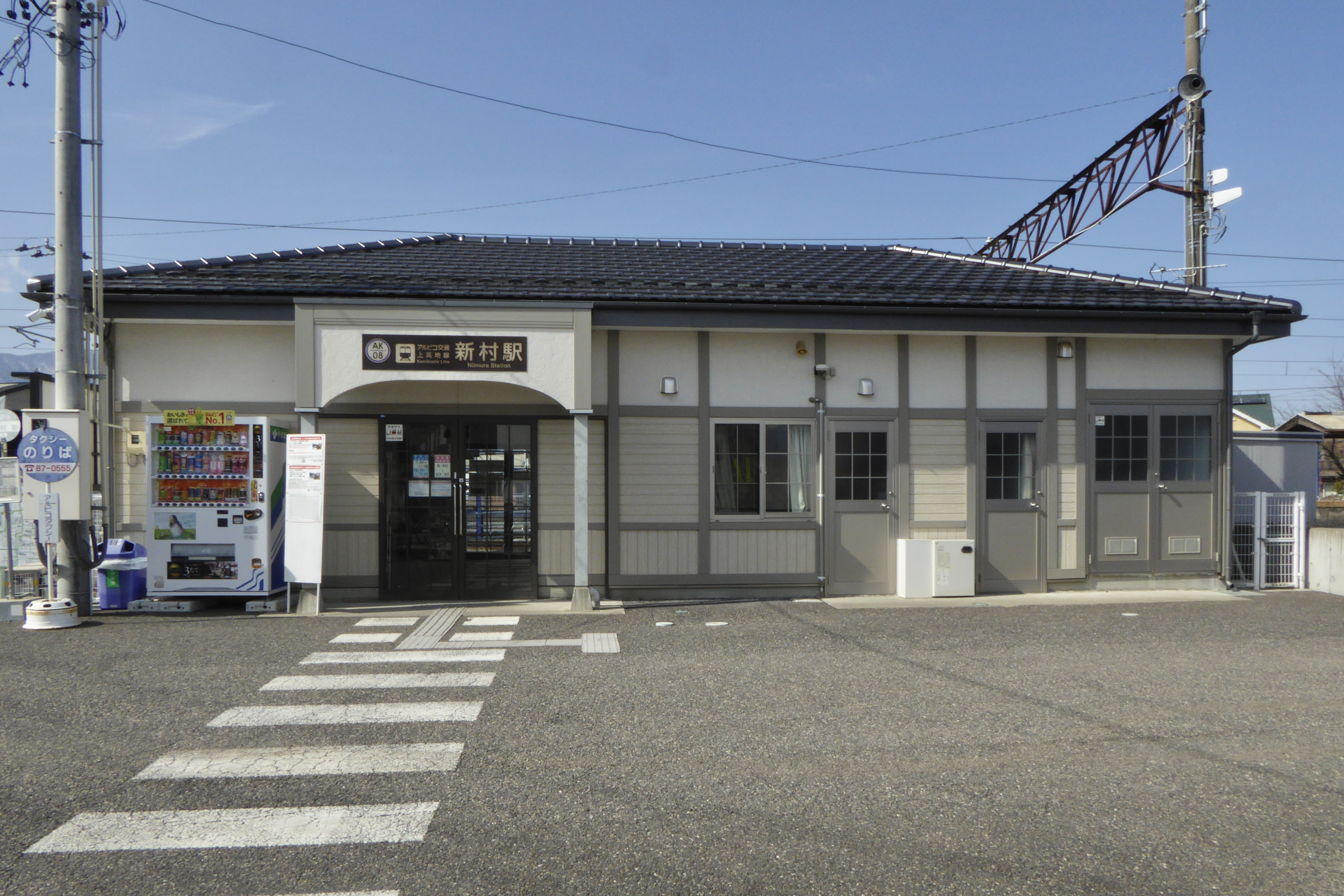
- Niimura Station in March 2022

General information
- Location: 4417-25 Hata-Moriguchi, Matsumoto-shi, Nagano-ken 390-1401; Japan
- Coordinates: 36°12′58.54″N 137°54′18.23″E
- Operator: Alpico Kōtsū
- Line: ■ Kamikōchi Line
- Distance: 6.2 km from Matsumoto
- Platforms: 1 island platform
- Tracks: 2

Other information
- Station code: AK-08
- Website: Official website

History
- Opened: 2 October 1921

Passengers
- FY2016: 142
Location
- Location within Nagano Prefecture Location within Japan

Niimura Station (新村駅, Niimura-eki) is a railway station in the city of Matsumoto, Nagano, Japan, operated by the private railway operating company Alpico Kōtsū.

== Lines ==
Niimura Station is a station on the Kamikōchi Line and is 6.2 kilometers from the terminus of the line at Matsumoto Station.

== Station layout ==
The station has one ground-level island platforms serving two tracks, connected to the station building by a level crossing.

=== Platforms ===
1	■ Kamikōchi Line	for Hata, Shinshimashima
2	■ Kamikōchi Line	for Shinano-Arai and Matsumoto

== Adjacent stations ==
«	Service	»
Kamikōchi Line
Kitanii-Matsumotodaigakumae	Local	Samizo

== History ==
The station opened on 2 October 1921. A new station building was completed in March 2012.

== Passenger statistics ==
In fiscal 2016, the station was used by an average of 142 passengers daily (boarding passengers only).

== Surrounding area ==
- National Route 158

== See also ==
- List of railway stations in Japan
