= Kamikōchi Line =

Railway line in Japan

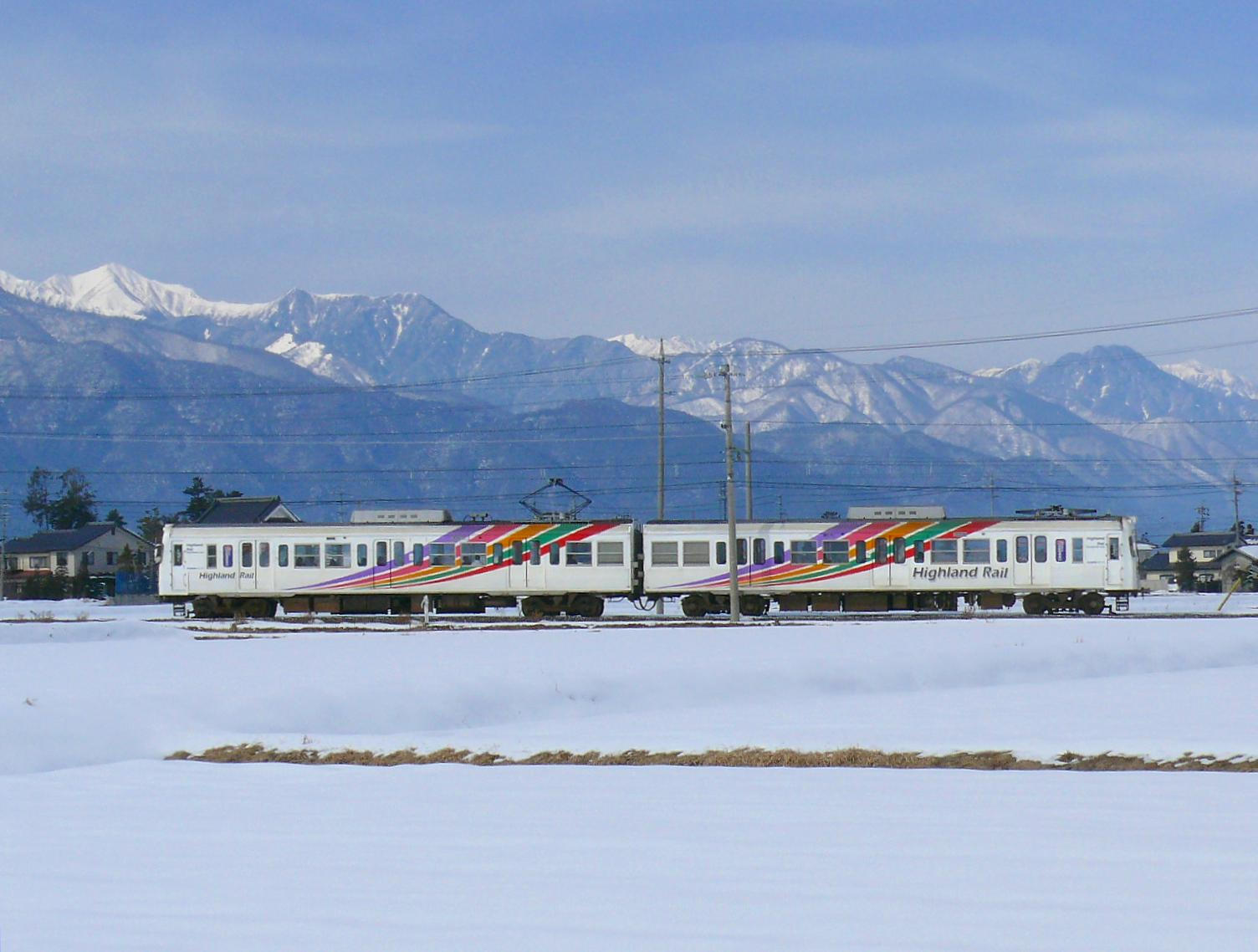
- A 3000 series train on the Kamikōchi Line in February 2008

Overview
- Status: Operational
- Owner: Alpico Kōtsū
- Locale: Matsumoto, Nagano
- Termini: Matsumoto; Shinshimashima

Service
- Type: Commuter rail and transport service to Kamikōchi shuttle bus terminal at Shinshimashima

History
- Opened: 2 October 1921

Technical
- Line length: 14.4 km (8.9 mi)
- Num of tracks: 1
- Track gauge: 1,067 mm (3 ft 6 in)
- Electrification: 1,500 V DC, overhead catenary

The Kamikōchi Line (上高地線, Kamikōchi-sen) is a railway line operated by the Japanese private railway operator Alpico Kōtsū in the western suburbs of Matsumoto, Nagano Prefecture. The line connects Matsumoto with Shinshimashima, the transportation gateway to Kamikōchi and the Hida Mountains.

== Stations ==
All stations on the line are located in the city of Matsumoto, Nagano.

Station No.	Name	Japanese	Distance (km)	Transfers
AK-01	Matsumoto	松本	0.0	Shinonoi Line ■ Oito Line
AK-02	Nishi-Matsumoto	西松本	0.4	
AK-03	Nagisa	渚	1.1	
AK-04	Shinano-Arai	信濃荒井	1.9	
AK-05	Ōniwa	大庭	2.6	
AK-06	Shimonii	下新	4.4	
AK-07	Kitanii-Matsumotodaigakumae	北新・松本大学前	5.4	
AK-08	Niimura	新村	6.2	
AK-09	Samizo	三溝	7.6	
AK-10	Moriguchi	森口	8.6	
AK-11	Shimojima	下島	9.5	
AK-12	Hata	波田	11.1	
AK-13	Endō	渕東	12.7	
AK-14	Shinshimashima	新島々	14.4	

== Rolling stock ==
As of 1 April 2017, services on the line are operated using a fleet of four two-car 3000 series stainless steel electric multiple unit (EMU) trains, which were formerly Keio 3000 series EMUs.

Former Tobu 20100 series EMUs of Tobu Railway replaced the 3000 series trains in April 2022.

With the raising of the overhead power supply voltage to 1,500 V DC in December 1986, the line's fleet was replaced by four two-car former Tokyu 5000 series EMUs. As these trains did not have air-conditioning, they were replaced between 1999 and 2000 by four two-car former Keio 3000 series EMUs.

Alpico Kotsu 20100 series (20101F)

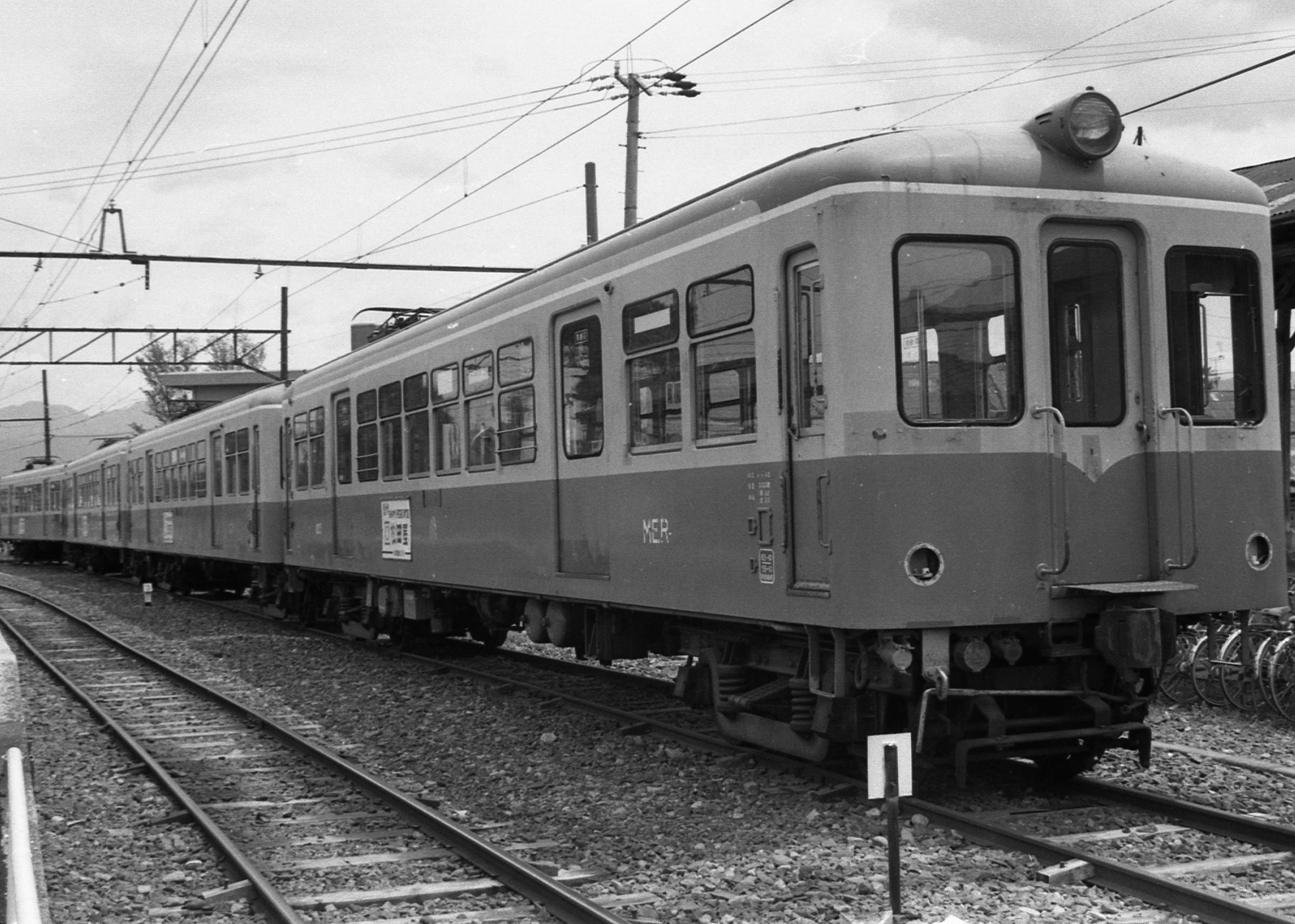
Withdrawn MoHa 10 EMU cars in 1988

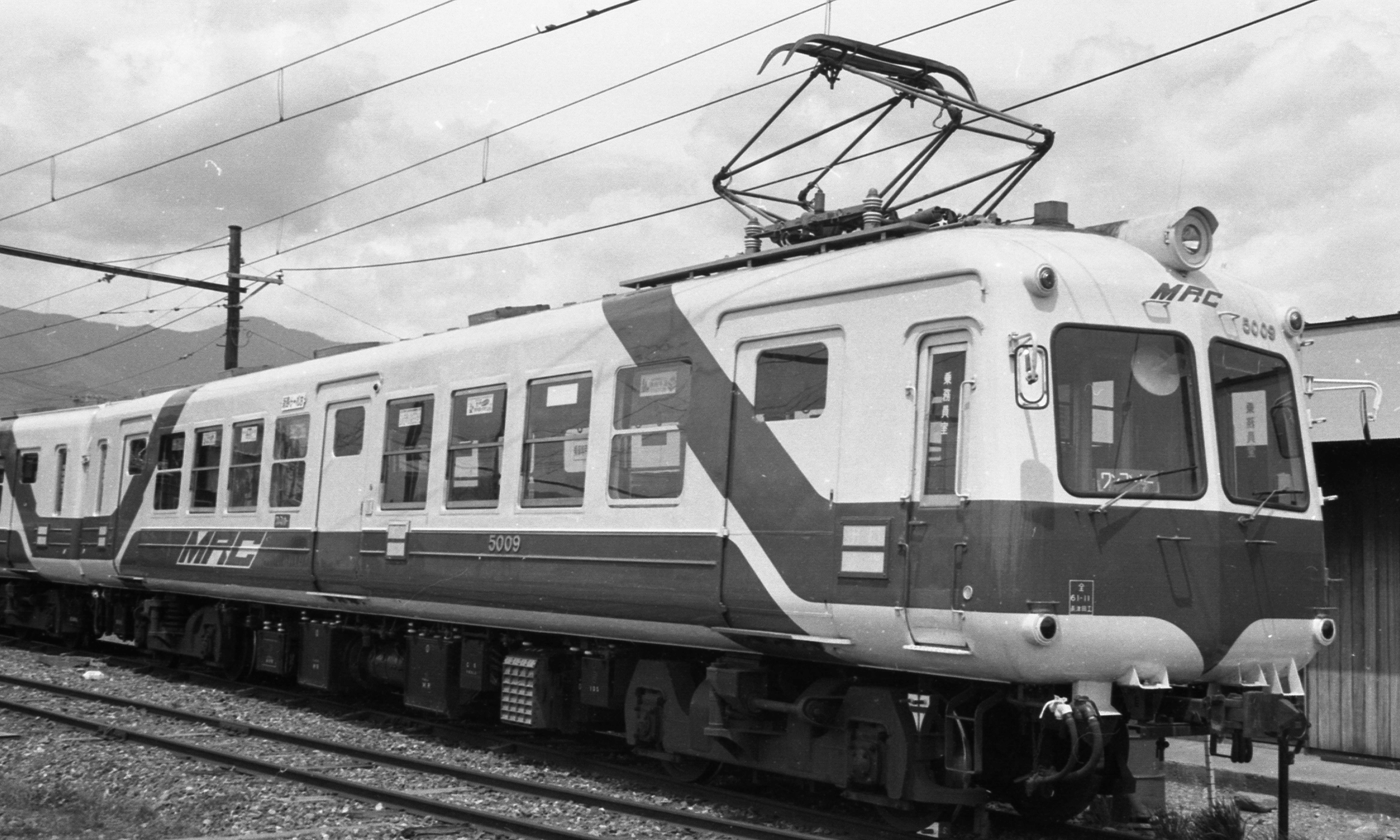
A 5000 series EMU in 1988

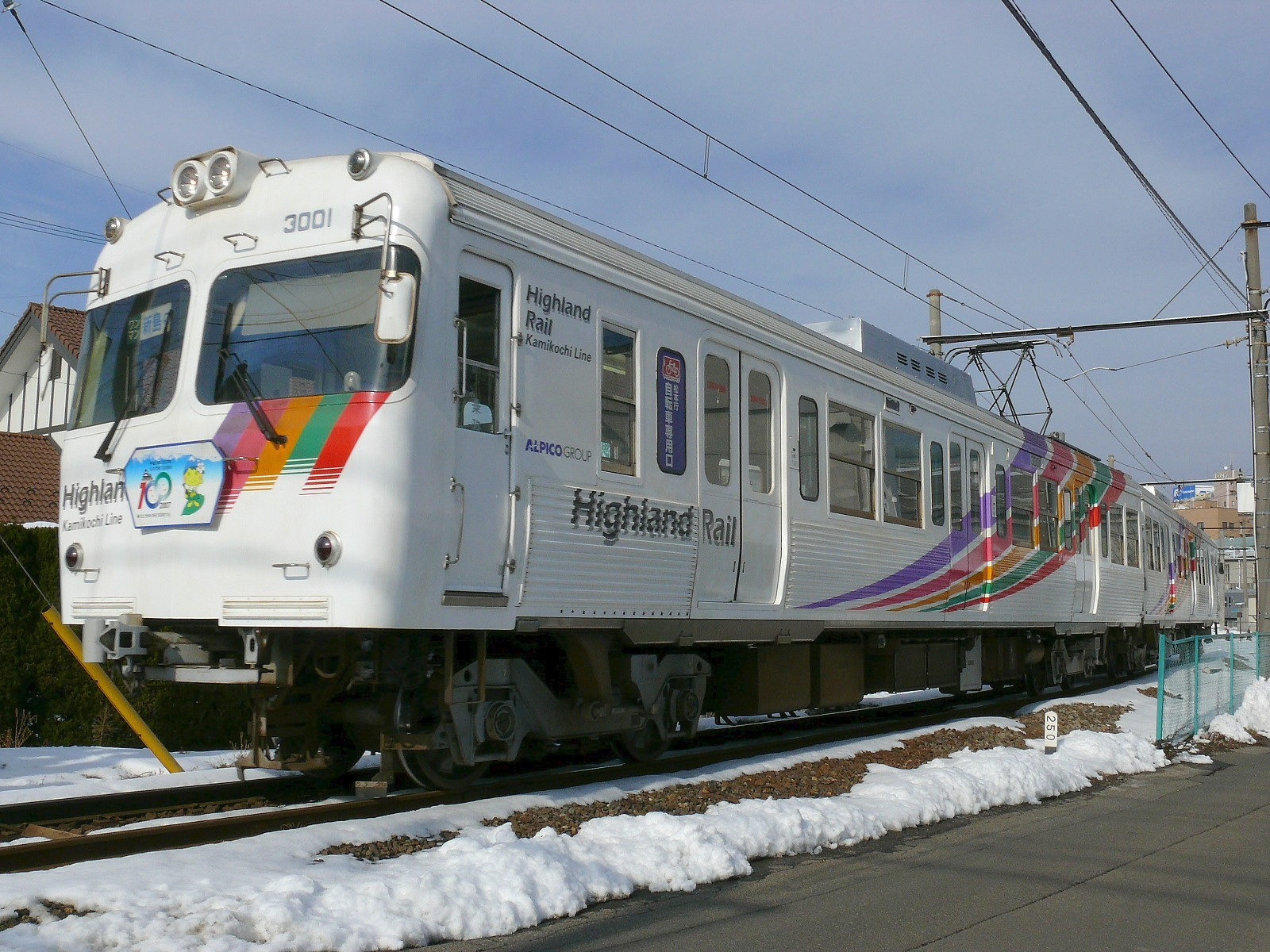
3000 series set 3001 in February 2008

== History ==
The line opened on 2 October 1921 as the Chikuma Railway (筑摩鉄道) from Matsumoto to Niimura, electrified at 600 V DC. The line was extended to Shimashima Station (now closed), opening on 26 September 1922.

On 27 December 1932, the Chikuma Railway was renamed the Matsumoto Electric Railway (松本電気鉄道).

The overhead line power supply voltage was increased from 600 V DC to 750 V DC in 1957, and further raised to 1,500 V DC in December 1986.

Freight services were discontinued from 1 December 1973.

In September 1983, landslides caused by Typhoon Forrest resulted in suspension of services on the line beyond Shinshimashima to Shimashima. This section was formally closed on 31 December 1984.

On 1 April 2011, following a merger with local bus operators, the operating company was renamed Alpico Kōtsū. However, the line is still occasionally referred to with its old operator's name as the "Matsumoto Dentetsu Kamikōchi Line"; station signage has been largely updated to instead read "ALPICO Kotsu Kamikōchi Line".

== See also ==
- List of railway lines in Japan
