= Shinshimashima Station =

Railway station in Matsumoto, Nagano Prefecture, Japan

Shinshimashima Station 新島々駅
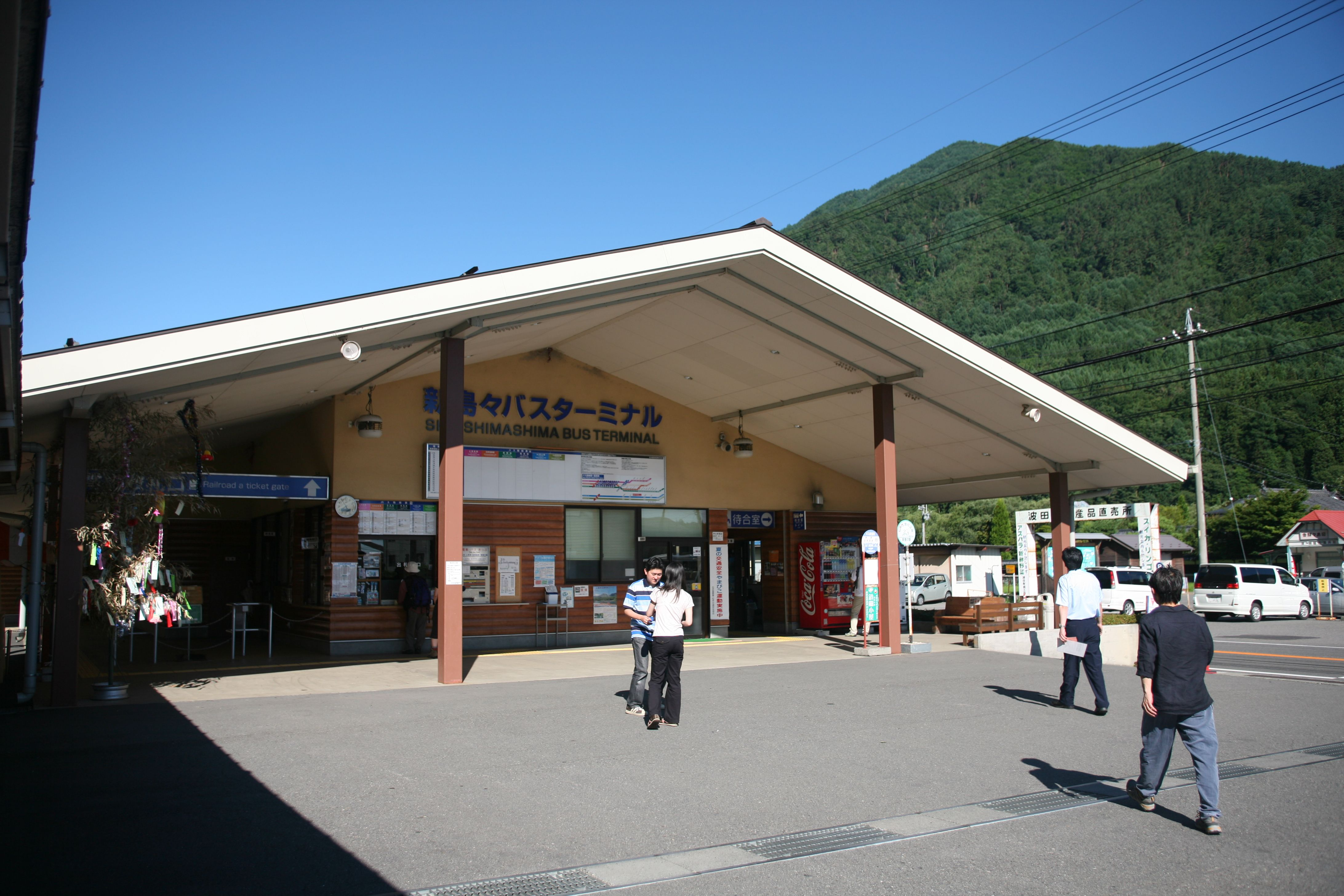
- Shinshimashima Station in July 2010

General information
- Location: 3050-1 Hata-Akamatsu, Matsumoto-shi, Nagano-ken 390-1401; Japan
- Coordinates: 36°11′23.3″N 137°49′18.3″E
- Operator: Alpico Kōtsū
- Line: ■ Kamikōchi Line
- Distance: 14.4 km from Matsumoto
- Platforms: 1 island platform
- Tracks: 2

Other information
- Station code: AK-14
- Website: Official website

History
- Opened: 26 September 1924
- Former names: Akamatsu (to 1966)

Passengers
- FY2016: 271
Location
- Location within Nagano Prefecture Location within Japan

Shinshimashima Station (新島々駅, Shinshimashima-eki) is a railway station in Matsumoto, Nagano, Japan, operated by the private railway operating company Alpico Kōtsū.

== Lines ==
Shinshimashima Station is the terminus of the Kamikōchi Line and is 14.4 kilometers from the opposing terminus of the line at Matsumoto Station.

== Station layout ==
The station has one dead-headed island platform serving two tracks. The platforms are not numbered

=== Platforms ===
branch line	■ Kamikōchi Line	for Hata, Niimura and Matsumoto
main line	■ Kamikōchi Line	for Hata, Niimura, Matsumoto

== Adjacent stations ==
«	Service	»
Kamikōchi Line
Endō	Local	Terminus

== History ==
The station opened on 26 September 1924 as Akamatsu Station (赤松駅). It was renamed to its present name on 1 October 1966. Due to damaged caused by the 1983 Typhoon 10, the line pass Shinshimashima Station was discontinued and replaced by a bus service, making this station the effective terminus of the line. A new station building was completed in 2002.

== Passenger statistics ==
In fiscal 2016, the station was used by an average of 201 passengers daily (boarding passengers only).

== Surrounding area ==
- Azusa River
- National Route 158

== See also ==
- List of railway stations in Japan
