= Japan National Route 158 =

Road in Japan

National Route 158
- 国道158号
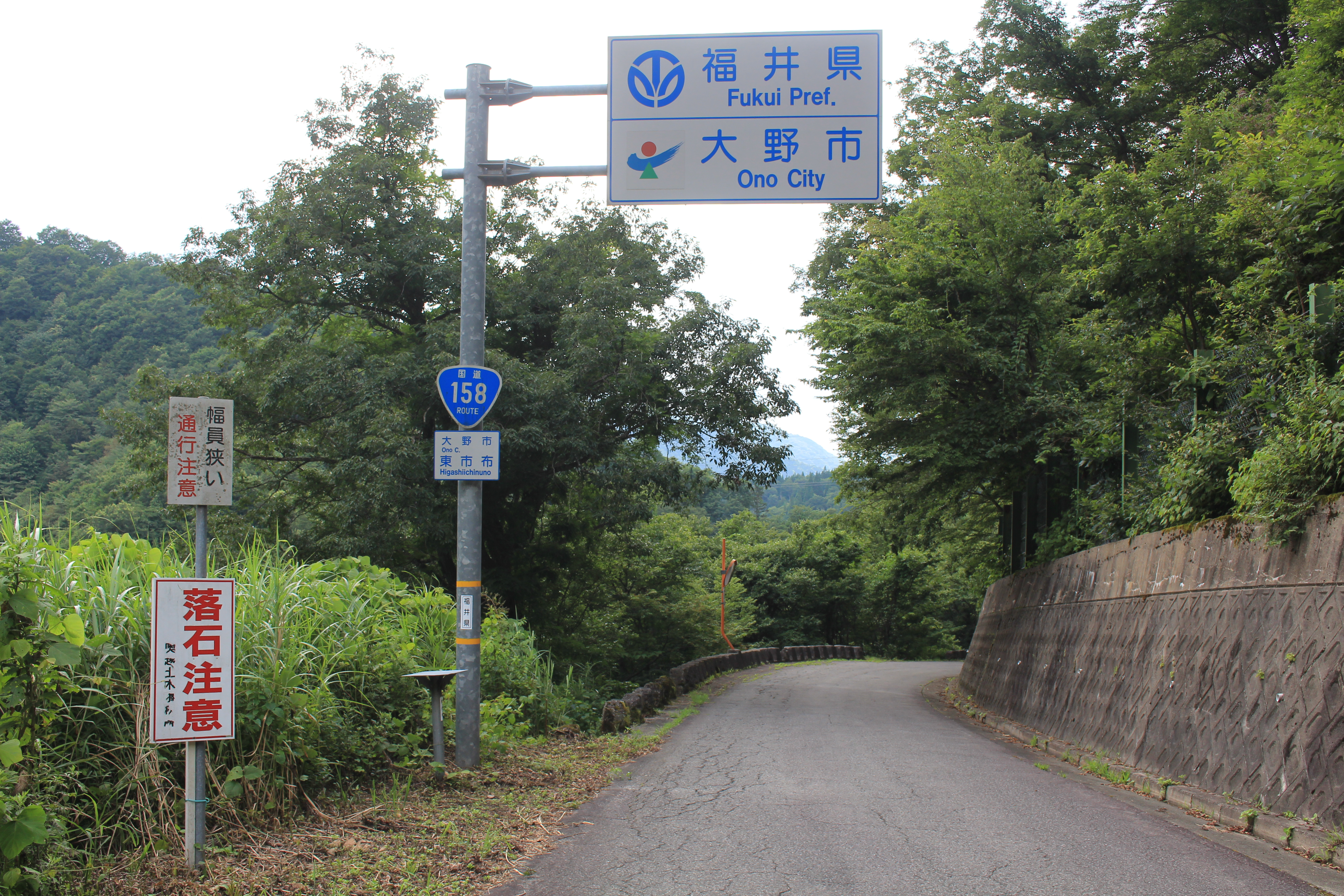

Route information
- Length: 250.1 km (155.4 mi)
- Existed: 1953–present

Major junctions
- West end: National Route 8 in Fukui
- East end: National Route 19 / National Route 143 in Matsumoto, Nagano

Location
- Country: Japan

Highway system
- National highways of Japan; Expressways of Japan
← National Route 157	→ National Route 159

National Route 158 is a national highway of Japan connecting Fukui and Matsumoto, Nagano in Japan, with a total length of 250.1 km (155.4 mi).
