= List of mergers in Nagano Prefecture =

Here is a list of mergers in Nagano Prefecture, Japan in the Heisei period (i.e. the current period).

== Mergers before April 1, 1999 ==
- On July 1, 1993 - The town of Kamisato (from Shimoina District) was merged into the expanded city of Iida.

== Mergers from April 1, 1999 to present ==
- On September 1, 2003 - The city of Koshoku was merged with the town of Kamiyamada (from Sarashina District), and the village of Togura (from Hanishina District) to create the city of Chikuma.
- On April 1, 2004 - The village of Kitamimaki (from Kitasaku District), and the town of Tōbu (from Chiisagata District) were merged to create the city of Tōmi.
- On January 1, 2005 - The village of Ōoka (from Sarashina District), the town of Toyono, and the villages of Kinasa and Togakushi (all from Kamiminochi District) were merged into the expanded city of Nagano. Sarashina District was dissolved as a result of this merger.
- On February 13, 2005 - The village of Yamaguchi (from Kiso District), along with the towns of Fukuoka, Sakashita and Tsukechi, and the villages of Hirukawa, Kashimo and Kawaue (all from Ena District, Gifu Prefecture), was transferred and merged into the expanded city of Nakatsugawa, Gifu Prefecture. The town of Misaka (神坂) was also merged into Nakatsugawa City. Exact date needed.
- On March 20, 2005 - The town of Saku and the village of Yachiho (both from Minamisaku District) were merged to create the town of Sakuho.
- On April 1, 2005 - The old city of Saku absorbed the town of Usuda (from Minamisaku District), and the town of Mochizuki, and the village of Asashina (both from Kitasaku District) to create the new and expanded city of Saku.
- On April 1, 2005 - The village of Narakawa (from Kiso District) was merged into the expanded city of Shiojiri.
- On April 1, 2005 - The village of Toyota (from Shimominochi District) was merged into the expanded city of Nakano.
- On April 1, 2005 - The village of Shiga (from Higashichikuma District), and the villages of Azumi, Azusagawa and Nagawa (all from Minamiazumi District) were merged into the expanded city of Matsumoto.
- On October 1, 2005 - The villages of Mure and Samizu (both from Kamiminochi District) were merged to create the town of Iizuna.
- On October 1, 2005 - The town of Akashina (from Higashichikuma District), the towns of Hotaka and Toyoshina, and the villages of Horigane and Misato (all from Minamiazumi District) were merged to create the city of Azumino. Minamiazumi District was dissolved as a result of this merger.
- On October 1, 2005 - The villages of Kami and Minamishinano (both from Shimoina District) were merged into the expanded city of Iida.
- On October 1, 2005 - The town of Nagato, and the village of Wada (both from Chiisagata District) were merged to create the town of Nagawa.
- On October 11, 2005 - The villages of Honjō, Sakai and Sakakita (all from Higashichikuma District) were merged to create the village of Chikuhoku.
- On November 1, 2005 - The town of Kisofukushima, and the villages of Hiyoshi, Kaida and Mitake (all from Kiso District) were merged to create the town of Kiso.
- On January 1, 2006 - The villages of Miasa and Yasaka (both from Kitaazumi District) were merged into the expanded city of Ōmachi.
- On January 1, 2006 - The village of Namiai (from Shimoina District) was merged into the expanded village of Achi.
- On March 6, 2006 - The old city of Ueda absorbed the towns of Maruko and Sanada, and the village of Takeshi (all from Chiisagata District) to create the new and expanded city of Ueda.
- On March 31, 2006 - The old city of Ina absorbed the town of Takatō, and the village of Hase (both from Kamiina District) to create the new and expanded city of Ina.
- On March 31, 2009 - The village of Seinaiji (from Shimoina District) was merged into the expanded village of Achi.
- On January 1, 2010 - The town of Shinshūshinmachi, and the village of Nakajō (both from Kamiminochi District) were merged into the expanded city of Nagano.
- On March 31, 2010 - The town of Hata (from Higashichikuma District) was merged into the expanded city of Matsumoto.
