= 1998 Winter Olympics torch relay =

- Host city: Nagano, Japan
- Countries visited: Greece, Japan
- Distance: 1,612 kilometres (1,002 mi)
- Torchbearers: 6,916
- Start date: December 19, 1997
- End date: February 7, 1998
- Torch designer: Akio Haruhara
- No. of torches: 69,010

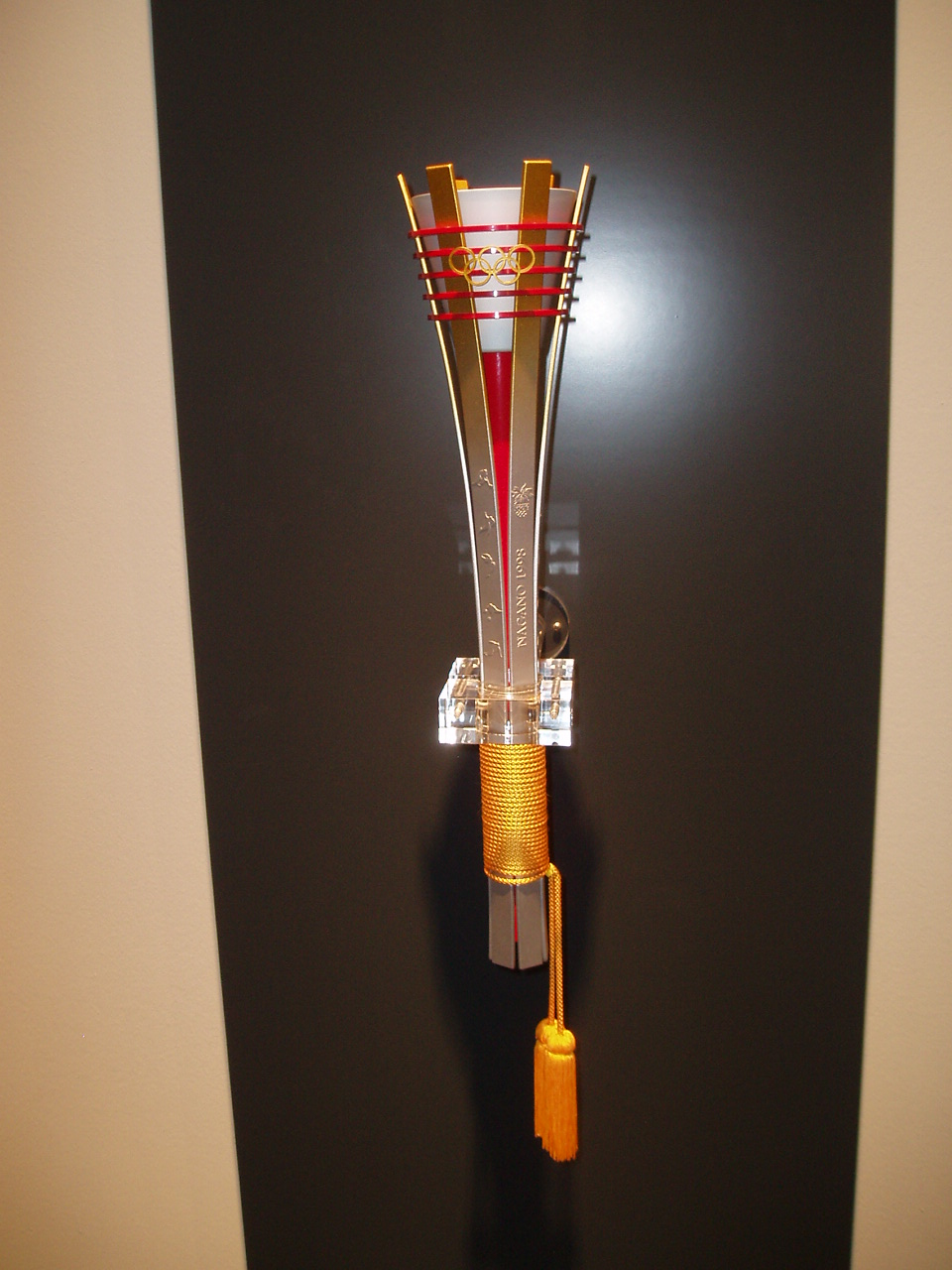
A torch from the relay

The 1998 Winter Olympics torch relay was run from December 19, 1997 until February 7, 1998 prior to the 1998 Winter Olympics in Nagano. The route covered around 1,612 kilometres (1,002 mi) and involved over 6,916 torchbearers. Midori Ito lit the cauldron at the opening ceremony.

== Route ==
=== Japan ===
In December 1997, Midori Ito, silver medalist in figure skating at the 1992 Winter Olympics and Eishiro Saito, Chairman of the Nagano Olympic Organizing Committee, brought the Olympic Torch to Ryutaro Hashimoto, at the time the Prime Minister of Japan.

Eastern Japan route

1. 6 January: Hokkaido
2. 7 January: Aomori
3. 8 January: Iwate
4. 9 January: Akita
5. 11 January: Miyagi
6. 12 January: Fukushima
7. 13 January: Yamagata
8. 14 January: Ibaraki
9. 15 January: Tochigi
10. 16 January: Gunma
11. 17 January: Saitama
12. 18 January: Chiba
13. 19 January: Tokyo
14. 21 January: Kanagawa
15. 22 January: Yamanashi

Pacific Ocean route

1. 6 January: Kagoshima
2. 7 January: Miyazaki
3. 8 January: Ōita
4. 9 January: Ehime
5. 10 January: Kōchi
6. 11 January: Tokushima
7. 12 January: Kagawa
8. 13 January: Okayama
9. 14 January: Hyōgo
10. 15 January: Osaka
11. 16 January: Nara
12. 17 January: Wakayama
13. 19 January: Mie
14. 20 January: Gifu
15. 21 January: Aichi
16. 22 January: Shizuoka

Japan Sea route

1. 6 January: Okinawa
2. 8 January: Kumamoto
3. 9 January: Nagasaki
4. 10 January: Saga
5. 11 January: Fukuoka
6. 12 January: Yamaguchi
7. 13 January: Hiroshima
8. 14 January: Shimane
9. 15 January: Tottori
10. 17 January: Kyoto
11. 18 January: Shiga
12. 19 January: Fukui
13. 20 January: Ishikawa
14. 21 January: Toyama
15. 22 January: Niigata

=== Nagano Prefecture ===
Nagano city route commenced on 6 and 7 February before the opening ceremony

Eastern Japan route

1. 23 January: Kawakami, Minamiaiki, Minamimaki, Kitaaiki
2. 24 January: Koumi, Yachiho, Sakumachi, Usuda
3. 25 January: Saku, Karuizawa
4. 26 January: Miyota, Komoro, Kitamimaki
5. 27 January: Asashina, Mochizuki, Tateshina
6. 29 January: Wada, Nagato, Takeshi
7. 30 January: Maruko, Tōbu, Sanada
8. 31 January: Aoki, Ueda
9. 1 February: Sakae, Nozawaonsen
10. 2 February: Kijimaidara, Iiyama, Toyota
11. 3 February: Yamanouchi, Nakano
12. 4 February: Shinano, Toyono, Samizu
13. 5 February: Obuse, Takayama, Suzaka

Pacific Ocean route

1. 23 January: Urugi, Neba, Hiraya, Namiai
2. 24 January: Seinaiji, Achi, Iida
3. 25 January: Shimojō, Anan, Yasuoka
4. 26 January: Tenryū, Minamishinano, Kami
5. 27 January: Takagi, Takamori, Matsukawa, Oshika
6. 29 January: Nakagawa, Iijima, Komagane
7. 30 January: Miyada, Hase, Takatō
8. 31 January: Ina, Minamiminowa, Minowa
9. 1 February: Tatsuno, Fujimi, Hara
10. 2 February: Chino, Suwa
11. 3 February: Shimosuwa, Okaya
12. 4 February: Ōoka, Ogawa, Nakajō
13. 5 February: Kinasa, Togakushi

Japan Sea route

1. 23 January: Otari, Hakuba
2. 24 January: Miasa, Yasaka, Ōmachi
3. 25 January: Ikeda, Matsukawa
4. 27 January: Yamaguchi, Nagiso, Ōkuwa, Agematsu
5. 28 January: Mitake, Ōtaki, Kaida
6. 29 January: Kisofukushima, Hiyoshi, Kiso, Narakawa
7. 30 January: Shiojiri, Asahi, Yamagata
8. 31 January: Matsumoto, Hata
9. 1 February: Nagawa, Azumi, Azusagawa
10. 2 February: Misato, Horigane, Toyoshina
11. 3 February: Hotaka, Akashina, Shiga
12. 4 February: Ikusaka, Honjō, Sakakita, Omi, Sakai
13. 5 February: Sakaki, Kamiyamada, Togura, Koshoku
