= Nagawa, Nagano (village) =

Dissolved municipality in Nagano prefecture, Japan

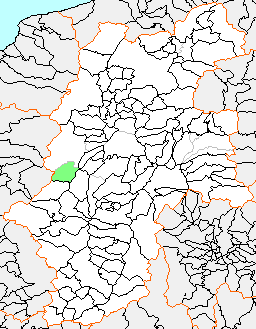
location of Nagawa in Nagano Prefecture

Nagawa (奈川村, Nagawa-mura) was a village located in Minamiazumi District, Nagano Prefecture, Japan.

On April 1, 2005, Nagawa, along with the village of Shiga (from Higashichikuma District), and the villages of Azumi and Azusagawa (all from Minamiazumi District), was merged into the expanded city of Matsumoto.
