= Azusagawa, Nagano =

Dissolved municipality in Nagano prefecture, Japan

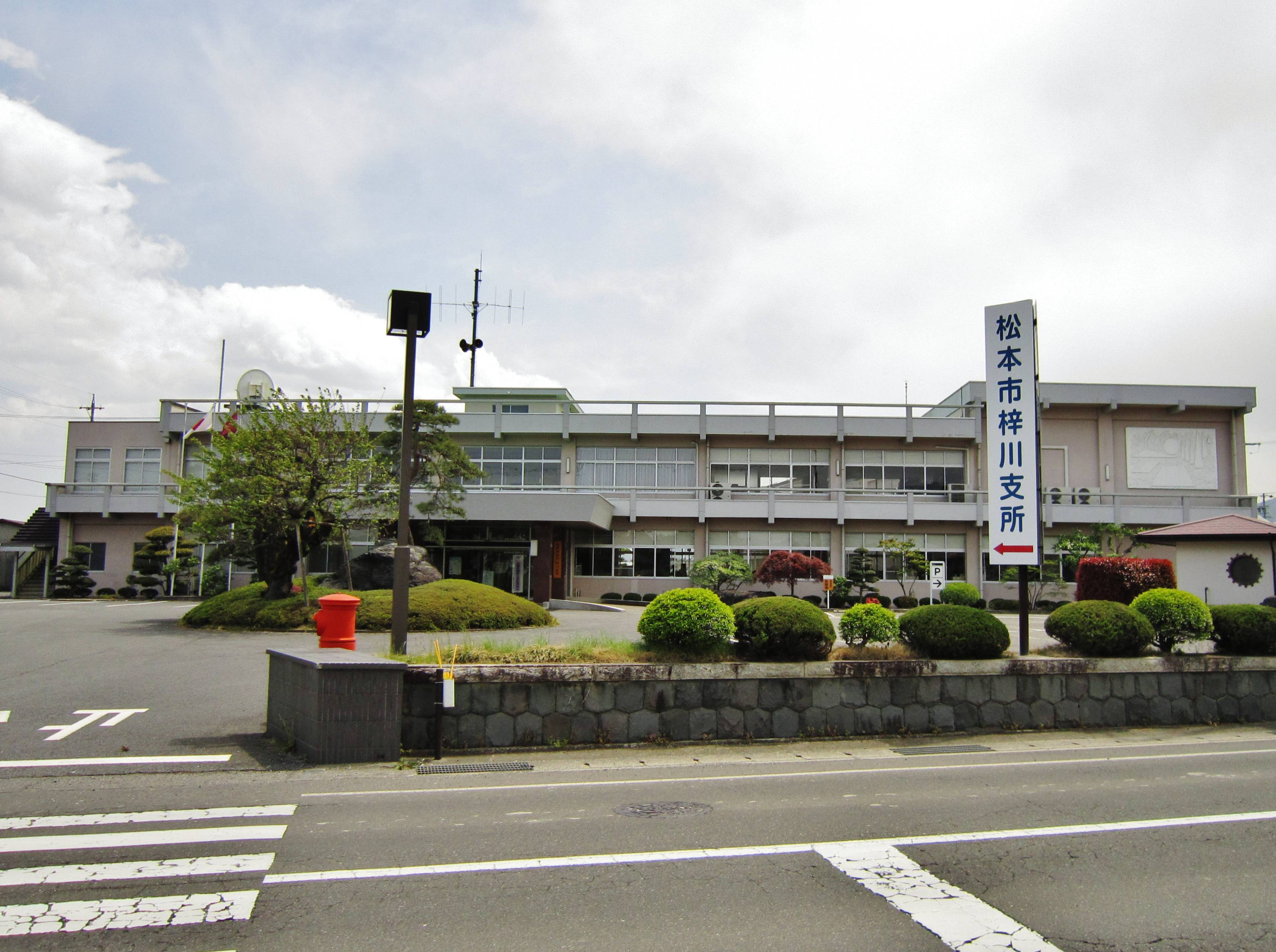
former Azusagawa village hall

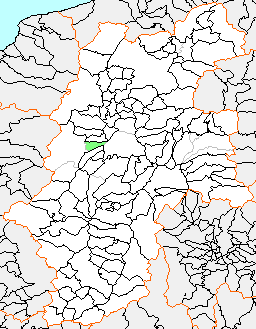
location of Azusagawa in Nagano Prefecture

Azusagawa (梓川村, Azusagawa-mura) was a village located in Minamiazumi District, Nagano Prefecture, Japan.

As of 2003, the village had an estimated population of 10,790 and a density of 254.48 persons per km^{2}. The total area was 42.40 km^{2}.

On April 1, 2005, Azusagawa, along with the village of Shiga (from Higashichikuma District), and the villages of Azumi and Nagawa (all from Minamiazumi District), was merged into the expanded city of Matsumoto.
