= Azumino =

Azumino 安曇野市
- City
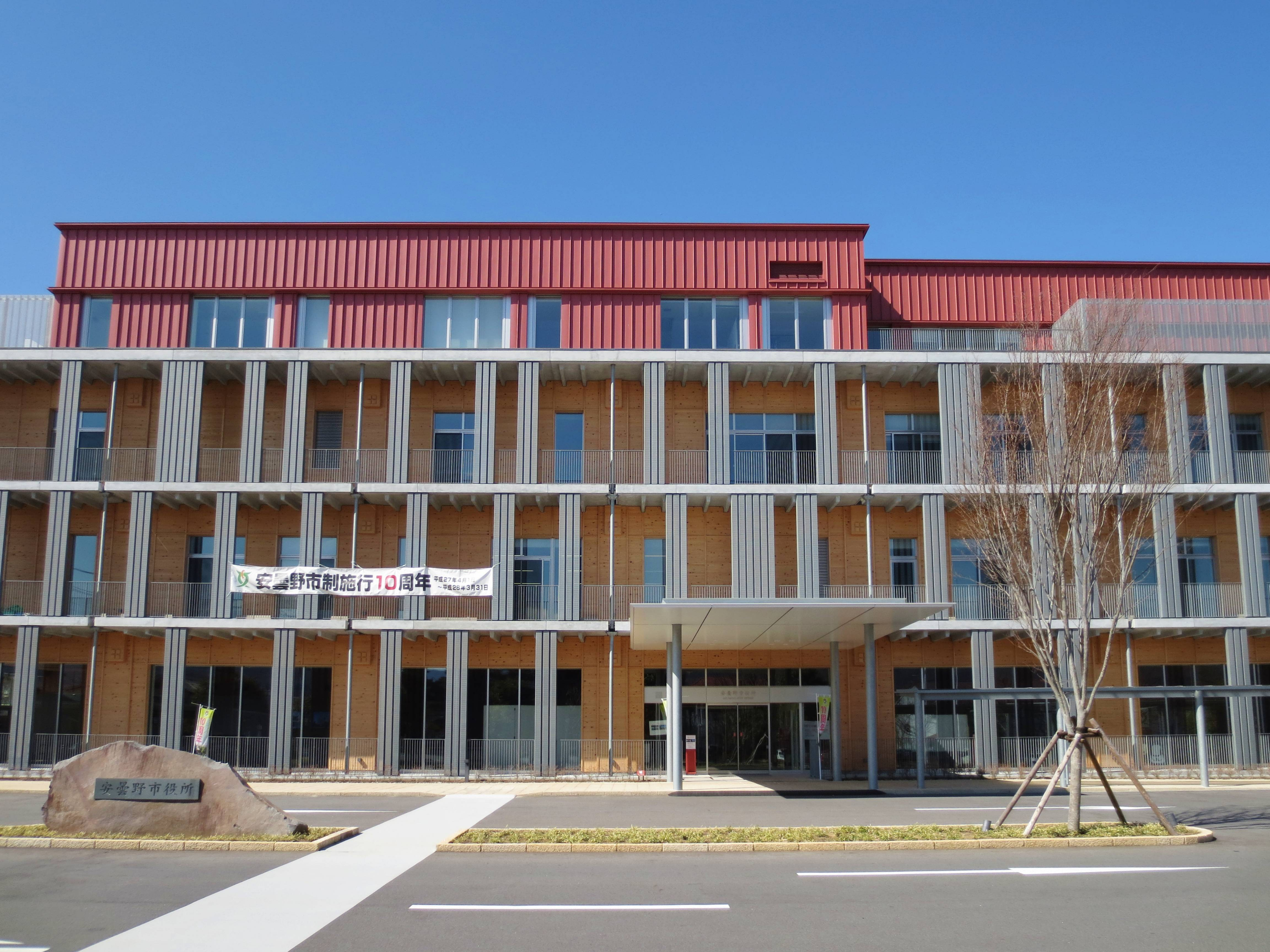
- Azumino City Hall

- Flag Seal

- Location of Azumino in Nagano Prefecture

- Coordinates: 36°18′14.17″N 137°54′20.81″E
- Country: Japan
- Region: Chūbu (Kōshin'etsu)
- Prefecture: Nagano
- First official recorded: 83 AD (official estimated)
- Five municipalities were merged and city settled: October 1, 2005

Government
  - Mayor: Hideki Nakayama (中山栄樹)- from January 2026

Area
  - Total: 331.78 km^{2} (128.10 sq mi)

Population (March 2019)
  - Total: 97,800
  - Density: 295/km^{2} (763/sq mi)
- Time zone: UTC+9 (Japan Standard Time)
- Phone number: 0263-71-2000
- Address: 4932-26 Toyoshina, Azumino-shi, Nagano-ken 399-8205
- Climate: Cfa/Dfa
- Website: Official website
- Symbols
- Flower: Wasabi
- Tree: Zelkova serrata

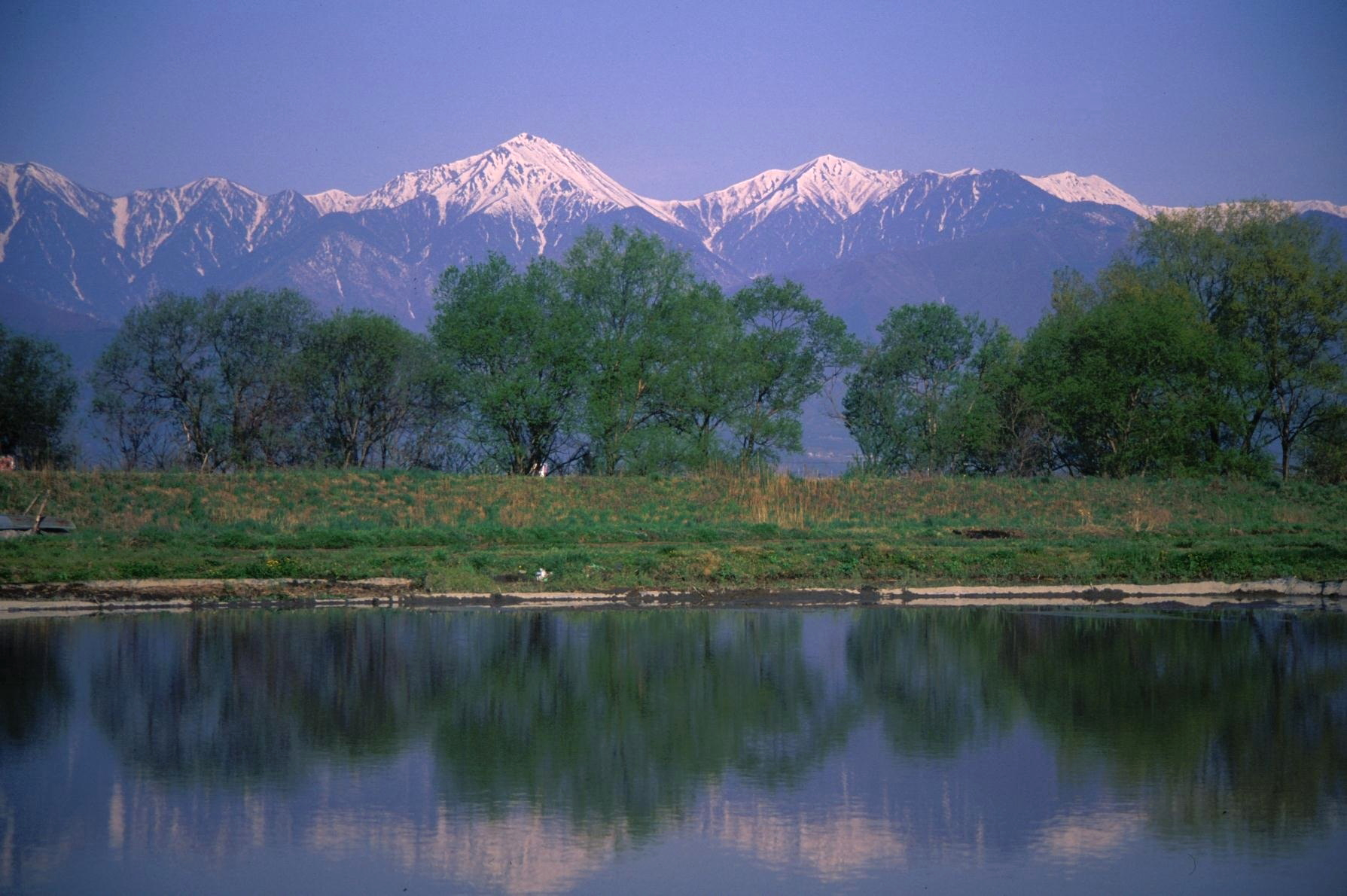
Mount Jonen in Azumino

Azumino (安曇野市, Azumino-shi; Japanese pronunciation: [ä̀.(d͡)zɨ́.mʲí.nó̞(.ɕì)]) is a city located in Nagano Prefecture, Japan. As of 1 March 2019, the city had an estimated population of 97,761 in 39744 households, and a population density of 290 persons per km^{2}. Its total area is 331.78 square kilometres (128.10 sq mi).

== Etymology ==
Azumino is a combination of two words, "Azumi" and "no". "Azumi" comes from the Azumi people, who are said to have moved to the "no" (plain) in ancient times. The Azumi people originally lived in northern Kyushu, and were famed for their skills in fishing and navigation. "The Azumi people" can be translated as "the people who live on the sea." The reason why the seafaring people migrated to this mountainous region is a mystery.

== Geography ==
Azumino is located in the Azumino Plateau on the northwestern end of the Matsumoto Basin, between mountain ranges to the west and east. The range of mountains on the western border is known as the Northern Alps (Hida Mountains) and is popular among hikers all over Japan. To the south is the city of Matsumoto, Nagano prefecture's second largest city. To the north lies the city of Ōmachi, and north of Ōmachi is the village of Hakuba. Hakuba was the site of many of the ski events during the 1998 Winter Olympic Games. Mount Jōnen at 2,857 metres (9,373 ft) is the highest elevation in the city.

=== Surrounding municipalities ===
- Nagano Prefecture
  - Chikuhoku
  - Ikeda
  - Ikusaka
  - Matsukawa
  - Matsumoto
  - Ōmachi

== Climate ==
The city has a climate characterized by characterized by hot and humid summers, and relatively mild winters (Köppen climate classification Cfa). The average annual temperature in Azumino is 11.8 °C (53.2 °F). The average annual rainfall is 1,108.7 mm (43.65 in) with September as the wettest month. The temperatures are highest on average in August, at around 24.7 °C (76.5 °F), and lowest in January, at around −0.8 °C (30.6 °F). The mountainous portions of the city are considered part of the snow country of Japan, with heavy accumulations of snow in winter.

Azumino city min/max temperature & rainfall

Climate chart (precipitation, max. and min. temperature)
J	F	M	A	M	J	J	A	S	O	N	D
45 4 −5	46 6 −5	84 11 −1	84 18 4	96 23 10	124 26 15	146 30 20	107 31 20	156 26 16	127 20 9	58 14 2	38 7 −3
- █ Average max. and min. temperatures in °C
- █ Precipitation totals in mm
- Source: Japan Meteorological Agency
Imperial conversion
J	F	M	A	M	J	J	A	S	O	N	D
1.8 40 22	1.8 42 23	3.3 51 29	3.3 64 39	3.8 74 50	4.9 79 59	5.7 85 67	4.2 88 68	6.1 79 61	5 67 48	2.3 56 36	1.5 45 28
- █ Average max. and min. temperatures in °F
- █ Precipitation totals in inches

Climate data for Hotaka, Azumino (1991–2020 normals, extremes 1978–present)
Month	Jan	Feb	Mar	Apr	May	Jun	Jul	Aug	Sep	Oct	Nov	Dec	Year
Record high °C (°F)	17.9 (64.2)	20.6 (69.1)	27.3 (81.1)	31.0 (87.8)	34.5 (94.1)	37.7 (99.9)	37.8 (100.0)	37.7 (99.9)	36.4 (97.5)	29.8 (85.6)	24.8 (76.6)	20.4 (68.7)	37.8 (100.0)
Mean daily maximum °C (°F)	4.3 (39.7)	5.8 (42.4)	10.7 (51.3)	17.8 (64.0)	23.4 (74.1)	26.1 (79.0)	29.6 (85.3)	31.1 (88.0)	25.9 (78.6)	19.5 (67.1)	13.5 (56.3)	7.3 (45.1)	17.9 (64.2)
Daily mean °C (°F)	−0.8 (30.6)	0.1 (32.2)	4.1 (39.4)	10.4 (50.7)	16.2 (61.2)	20.0 (68.0)	23.8 (74.8)	24.7 (76.5)	20.2 (68.4)	13.6 (56.5)	7.2 (45.0)	1.9 (35.4)	11.8 (53.2)
Mean daily minimum °C (°F)	−5.3 (22.5)	−5.0 (23.0)	−1.4 (29.5)	3.8 (38.8)	9.9 (49.8)	15.1 (59.2)	19.5 (67.1)	20.2 (68.4)	15.9 (60.6)	8.9 (48.0)	2.1 (35.8)	−2.5 (27.5)	6.8 (44.2)
Record low °C (°F)	−16.7 (1.9)	−17.1 (1.2)	−12.8 (9.0)	−7.5 (18.5)	−0.5 (31.1)	5.7 (42.3)	12.0 (53.6)	10.9 (51.6)	3.8 (38.8)	−1.8 (28.8)	−6.2 (20.8)	−14.2 (6.4)	−17.1 (1.2)
Average precipitation mm (inches)	45.4 (1.79)	45.5 (1.79)	83.8 (3.30)	83.5 (3.29)	95.6 (3.76)	123.7 (4.87)	145.5 (5.73)	106.7 (4.20)	155.8 (6.13)	126.6 (4.98)	58.4 (2.30)	38.2 (1.50)	1,108.7 (43.65)
Average precipitation days (≥ 1.0 mm)	6.4	6.6	9.4	8.6	8.9	10.6	12.5	10.1	10.5	8.7	6.6	6.9	105.8
Mean monthly sunshine hours	139.9	148.3	172.1	193.9	201.6	149.0	151.2	184.3	131.4	137.1	135.2	130.2	1,874.1
Source: Japan Meteorological Agency (1991–2020 normals, extremes 1978–present)

== History ==
The area of present-day Azumino was part of ancient Shinano Province. The area was part of the holdings of Matsumoto Domain during the Edo period. The modern city of Azumino was established on October 1, 2005, by the merger of the town of Akashina (from Higashichikuma District), the towns of Hotaka and Toyoshina, and the villages of Horigane and Misato (all from Minamiazumi District).

== Demographics ==
Per Japanese census data, the population of Azumino has recently plateaued after several decades of growth.

Historical population
Year	Pop.	±%
1960	66,564	—
1970	65,690	−1.3%
1980	75,209	+14.5%
1990	83,154	+10.6%
2000	92,864	+11.7%
2010	96,461	+3.9%
2020	94,222	−2.3%

== Government ==
Azumino has a mayor-council form of government with a directly elected mayor and a unicameral city legislature of 22 members.

== Education ==
Azumino has ten public elementary schools and seven public middle schools. The city has four public high schools operated by the Nagano Prefectural Board of Education.

== Transportation ==
=== Railway ===
- East Japan Railway Company - Ōito Line
  - Azusabashi - Hitoichiba - Nakagaya - Minami-Toyoshina - Toyoshina - Hakuyachō - Hotaka - Ariake - Azumi-Oiwake
- East Japan Railway Company - Shinonoi Line
  - Tazawa - Akashina

=== Highway ===
- Nagano Expressway
- National Route 19
- National Route 143
- National Route 147
- National Route 304

== Sister cities ==
=== Domestic ===
- Misato, Saitama, Saitama Prefecture
- Edogawa, Tokyo
- Musashino, Tokyo
- Manazuru, Kanagawa
- Sangō, Nara
- Higashi-ku, Fukuoka

=== International ===
- - Kramsach, Austria, since November 25, 1993
- - Collierville, Tennessee, United States

== Local attractions ==
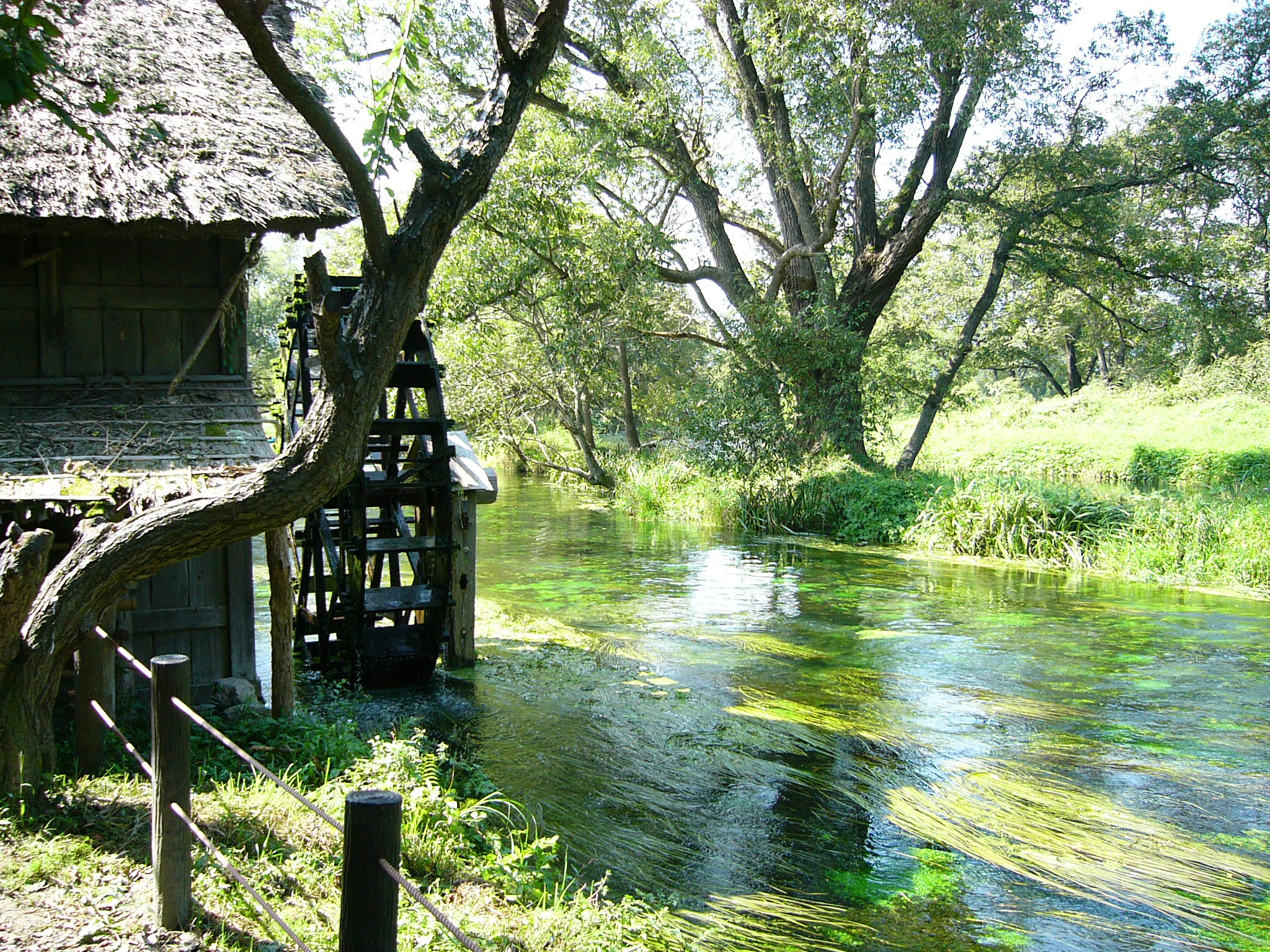
Daio Wasabi Farm

- Azumino is home to the world's largest wasabi farm, Daio Wasabi Farm.
- Jōkyō Gimin Memorial Museum
- Hotaka Jinja
- Mount Jōnen
- Mount Chō

== Notable people ==
- Noriyasu Agematsu (born 1978), composer
- Shogo Asada (born 1998), footballer
- Hiroaki Asano (born 1978), volleyball player
- Masaaki Iinuma (1912–1941), pilot and aviation pioneer
- Kiyoshi Kiyosawa (1890–1945), journalist
- Kei Kumai (1930–2007), film director
- Gisiro Maruyama (1916–1986), mathematician
- Rokuzan Ogiwara (1879–1910), sculptor
- Michihiko Ohta (born 1964), singer-songwriter
- Aizō Sōma (1870–1954), founded Nakamuraya
- Tada Kasuke (?–1687), executed farmer
- Shunsuke Mutai (born 1956), politician
- Ryū Saitō (1879–1953), general
- Yasuyoshi Shirasawa (1868–1947), botanist
- Etsujirō Uehara (1877–1962), political scientist and politician
- Bumpei Usui, a professional artist, came from Tōmi in Horikin Village, Minami Azumino County, Nagano Prefecture.
- Yoshimi Usui (1905–1987), editor and writer
