= Azumi, Nagano =

Village in Japan

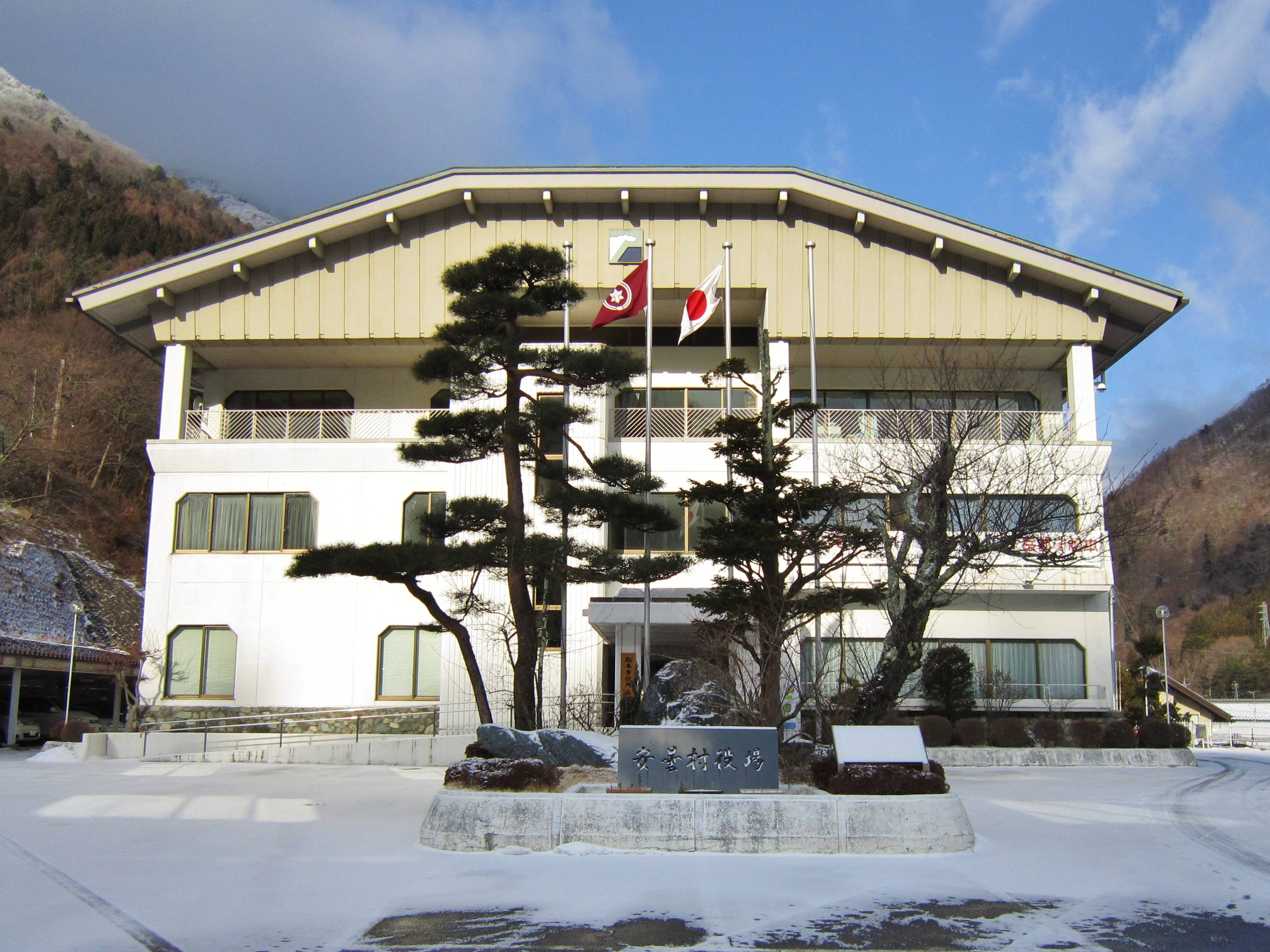
former Azumi village hall

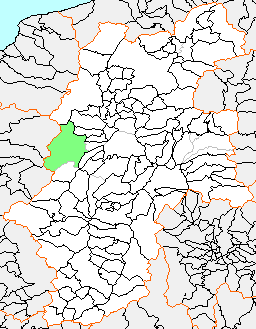
Location of Azumi in Nagano Prefecture

Azumi (安曇村, Azumi-mura) was a village located in Minamiazumi District, Nagano Prefecture, Japan.

As of 2003, the village had an estimated population of 2,534 and a density of 6.31 persons per km^{2}. The total area was 401.50 km^{2}.

On April 1, 2005, Azumi, along with the village of Shiga, from Higashichikuma District, and the villages of Azusagawa and Nagawa (all from Minamiazumi District), was merged into the expanded city of Matsumoto.
