= Shiga, Nagano =

Dissolved municipality in Nagano prefecture, Japan

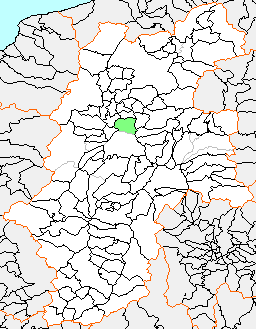
Location of Shiga in Nagano Prefecture

Shiga (四賀村, Shiga-mura) was a village located in Higashichikuma District, Nagano Prefecture, Japan.

== Population ==
As of 2003, the village had an estimated population of 5,917 and a density of 65.56 persons per km^{2}. The total area was 90.25 km^{2}.

== History ==
On April 1, 2005, Shiga, along with the villages of Azumi, Azusagawa and Nagawa (all from Minamiazumi District), was merged into the expanded city of Matsumoto.
