= Matsumoto, Nagano =

Core city in Nagano, Chūbu, Japan

Matsumoto 松本市
- Core city
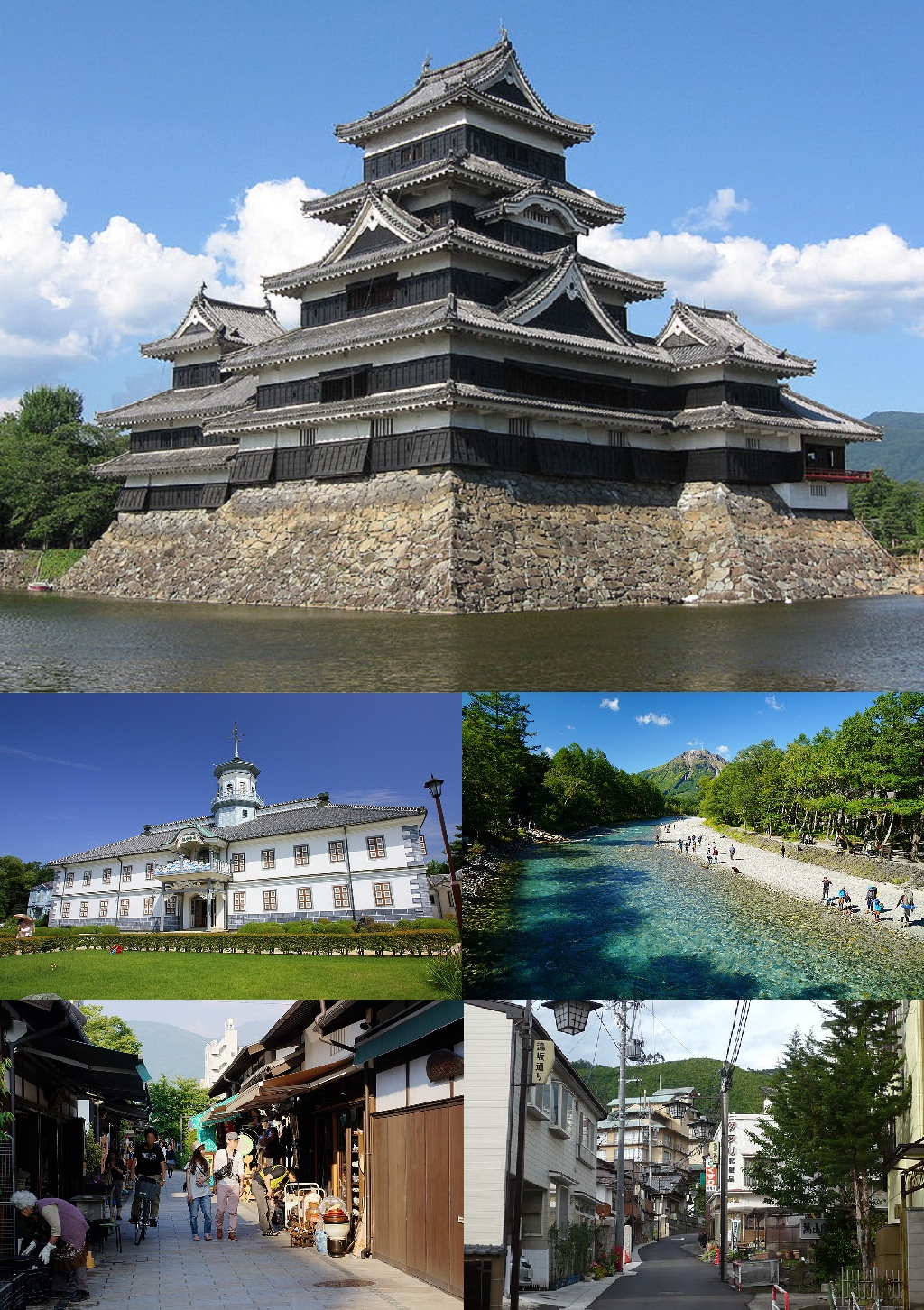
- From top (left to right): Matsumoto Castle, A heritage building of Kaichi School, A view of Kamikōchi, Mount Yake and Azusa River, Nawate souvenir shopping street, A street view of Asama Spa.

- Flag Seal
- Interactive map of Matsumoto
- Matsumoto (Chubu region) Matsumoto (Nagano Prefecture)
- Coordinates: 36°14′16.8″N 137°58′19.1″E
- Country: Japan
- Region: Chūbu (Kōshin'etsu)
- Prefecture: Nagano Prefecture
- First official recorded: 4th century
- City settled: May 1, 1907

Government
  - Mayor: Yoshinao Gaun

Area
  - Total: 978.47 km^{2} (377.79 sq mi)

Population (June 1, 2025)
  - Total: 235,972
  - Density: 241.16/km^{2} (624.61/sq mi)
- Time zone: UTC+9 (Japan Standard Time)
- Phone number: 0263-34-3000
- Address: 3–7 Marunouchi, Matsumoto-shi, Nagano-ken 390-8620
- Climate: Cfa/Dfa
- Website: Official website
- Symbols
- Flower: Japanese azalea
- Tree: Japanese Red Pine

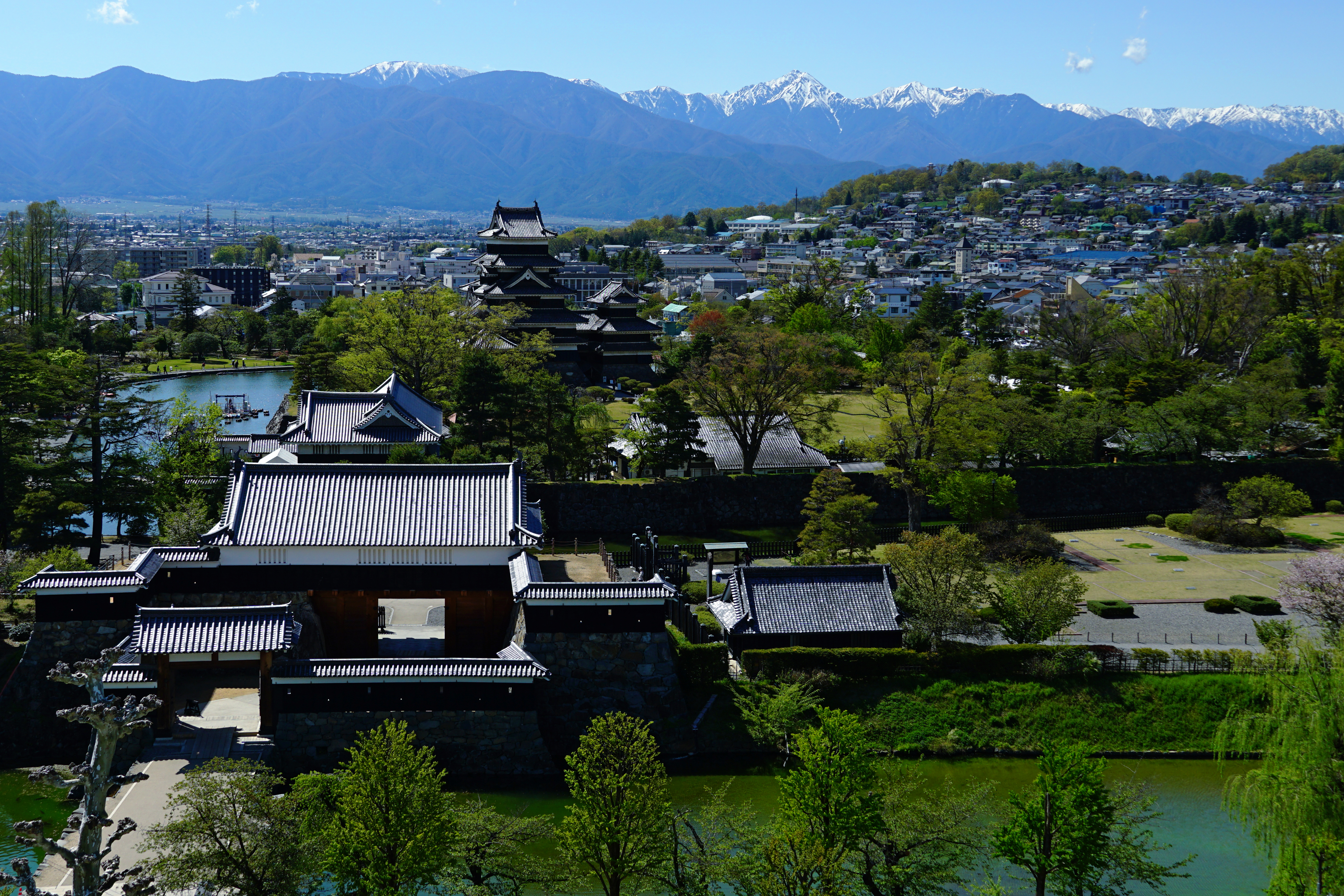
Matsumoto Castle and Hida Mountains

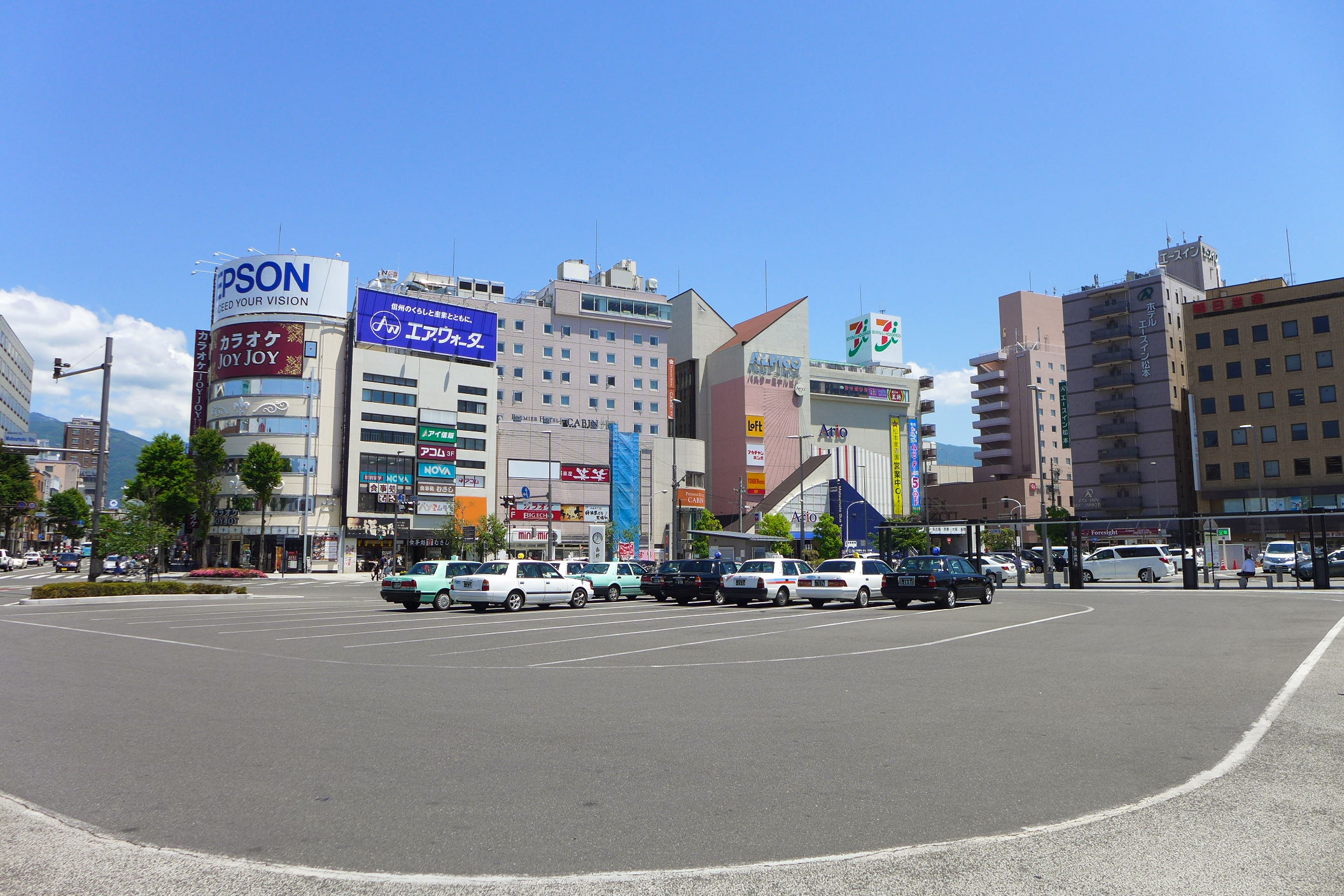
Buildings near Matsumoto Station

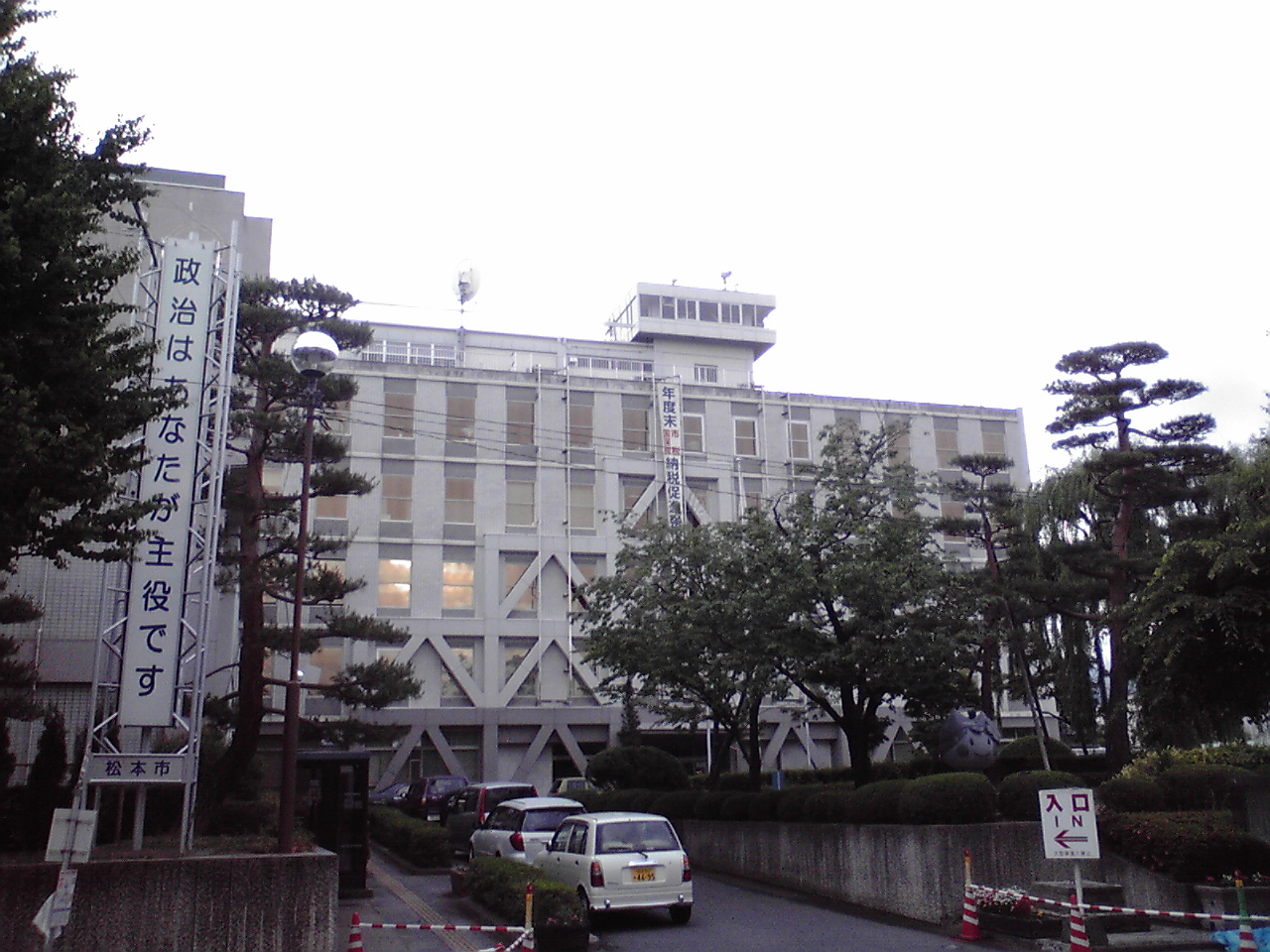
Matsumoto City Hall

Matsumoto (松本市, Matsumoto-shi; Japanese pronunciation: [mä̀.t͡sɨ́.mó̞.tó̞(.ɕì)]) is a city located in Nagano Prefecture, Japan. Matsumoto is designated as a core city since 1 April 2021. As of 1 March 2019, the city had a population of 239,466 in 105,207 households and a population density of 240 persons per km^{2}. The total area of the city is 978.47 square kilometres (377.79 sq mi).

== History ==
Matsumoto is located in the former Shinano Province and was the provincial capital from the Heian period onwards. The area developed as the castle town of Matsumoto Domain under the Tokugawa shogunate of the Edo period. Modern Matsumoto Town was established with the creation of the municipalities system on 1 April 1889. It was raised to city status on 1 May 1907.

On 1 February 1925, Matsumoto absorbed the village of Matsumoto (from Higashichikuma District).

The city expanded further by annexing the Kanda hamlet of the village of Nakayama from Higashichikuma District on 1 April 1943, the villages of Nakayama, Shimadachi and Shimauchi (all from Higashichikuma District) on 1 April 1954, the villages of Wada, Niimura, Kanbayashi, Sasaga, Yoshikawa, Kotobuki, Okada, Iriyamabe, Satoyamabe and Imai (all from Higashichikuma District) on 1 August 1954. Kitauchida and Gakenoyu hamlets were annexed from the Minamiuchida ward of the village of Kataoka in the city of Shiojiri on 1 April 1960 and 1 April 1961. The village of Hongo (from Higashichikuma District) on 1 May 1974 and parts of Seba hamlet (the hamlet of Kukohigashi) were annexed from Shiojiri on 1 April 1982.

On 27 June 1994, the Matsumoto sarin attack occurred.

Matsumoto was proclaimed a special city with increased local autonomy on 1 November 2000. Matsumoto annexed the villages of Azumi, Azusagawa and Nagawa (all from Minamiazumi District), and the village of Shiga (from Higashichikuma District) on 1 April 2005. This was followed by the town of Hata (from Higashichikuma District) on 31 March 2010. Matsumoto was proclaimed a core city with increased local autonomy on 1 April 2021.

== Geography ==
Matsumoto is located in the Matsumoto Basin of central Nagano Prefecture surrounded by mountains and is acclaimed for its beautiful views. It is approximately 75 kilometers south of the prefectural capital at Nagano City, and 167 kilometers from central Tokyo. The 3000 meter Hida Mountains are to the west of the city, with 3190 meter Mount Hotakadake on the border of Matsumoto with Takayama, Gifu as the highest point within the city limits.

=== Surrounding municipalities ===
- Gifu Prefecture
  - Takayama
- Nagano Prefecture
  - Okaya
  - Aoki
  - Asahi
  - Azumino
  - Chikuhoku
  - Kiso-machi
  - Kiso-mura
  - Nagawa
  - Ōmachi
  - Shimosuwa
  - Shiojiri
  - Ueda
  - Yamagata

== Climate ==
Matsumoto has a humid continental climate (Köppen climate classification: Dfa) bordering on a humid subtropical climate (Köppen climate classification: Cfa), with hot summers and cold winters. Precipitation is quite high in summer, but the weather is somewhat drier in winter. The average annual temperature in Matsumoto is 12.2 °C (54.0 °F). The average annual rainfall is 1,045.1 mm (41.15 in) with September as the wettest month. The temperatures are highest on average in August, at around 25.1 °C (77.2 °F), and lowest in January, at around −0.3 °C (31.5 °F).

Climate data for Matsumoto (1991–2020 normals, extremes 1898–present)
| Month | Jan | Feb | Mar | Apr | May | Jun | Jul | Aug | Sep | Oct | Nov | Dec | Year |
|---|---|---|---|---|---|---|---|---|---|---|---|---|---|
| Record high °C (°F) | 18.8 (65.8) | 21.1 (70.0) | 26.1 (79.0) | 30.9 (87.6) | 34.0 (93.2) | 37.1 (98.8) | 37.9 (100.2) | 38.5 (101.3) | 36.1 (97.0) | 31.8 (89.2) | 26.3 (79.3) | 21.5 (70.7) | 38.5 (101.3) |
| Mean daily maximum °C (°F) | 5.1 (41.2) | 6.6 (43.9) | 11.2 (52.2) | 17.9 (64.2) | 23.6 (74.5) | 26.4 (79.5) | 30.0 (86.0) | 31.4 (88.5) | 26.2 (79.2) | 19.8 (67.6) | 13.9 (57.0) | 8.0 (46.4) | 18.4 (65.1) |
| Daily mean °C (°F) | −0.3 (31.5) | 0.6 (33.1) | 4.6 (40.3) | 10.8 (51.4) | 16.5 (61.7) | 20.2 (68.4) | 24.2 (75.6) | 25.1 (77.2) | 20.4 (68.7) | 13.9 (57.0) | 7.8 (46.0) | 2.5 (36.5) | 12.2 (54.0) |
| Mean daily minimum °C (°F) | −4.9 (23.2) | −4.5 (23.9) | −1.0 (30.2) | 4.4 (39.9) | 10.4 (50.7) | 15.4 (59.7) | 19.8 (67.6) | 20.5 (68.9) | 16.2 (61.2) | 9.2 (48.6) | 2.6 (36.7) | −2.2 (28.0) | 7.2 (45.0) |
| Record low °C (°F) | −24.8 (−12.6) | −20.4 (−4.7) | −17.9 (−0.2) | −10.1 (13.8) | −2.7 (27.1) | 2.3 (36.1) | 10.2 (50.4) | 8.0 (46.4) | 3.0 (37.4) | −3.6 (25.5) | −8.4 (16.9) | −19.2 (−2.6) | −24.8 (−12.6) |
| Average precipitation mm (inches) | 39.8 (1.57) | 38.5 (1.52) | 78.0 (3.07) | 81.1 (3.19) | 94.5 (3.72) | 114.9 (4.52) | 131.3 (5.17) | 101.6 (4.00) | 148.0 (5.83) | 128.3 (5.05) | 56.3 (2.22) | 32.7 (1.29) | 1,045.1 (41.15) |
| Average snowfall cm (inches) | 33 (13) | 22 (8.7) | 12 (4.7) | 1 (0.4) | 0 (0) | 0 (0) | 0 (0) | 0 (0) | 0 (0) | 0 (0) | 0 (0) | 8 (3.1) | 76 (30) |
| Average precipitation days (≥ 0.5 mm) | 6.0 | 6.1 | 9.0 | 9.1 | 9.1 | 11.3 | 13.0 | 10.3 | 10.6 | 9.2 | 6.5 | 6.6 | 106.9 |
| Average relative humidity (%) | 67 | 64 | 62 | 58 | 60 | 69 | 71 | 70 | 74 | 75 | 71 | 69 | 68 |
| Mean monthly sunshine hours | 172.5 | 171.2 | 190.9 | 204.8 | 215.6 | 166.3 | 174.8 | 202.9 | 151.0 | 160.9 | 163.0 | 160.9 | 2,134.7 |
Source: Japan Meteorological Agency (1991–2020 normals, extremes 1898–present)

Climate data for Matsumoto Airport, Matsumoto Imai, Matsumoto (2003–2020 normals, extremes 2003–present)
| Month | Jan | Feb | Mar | Apr | May | Jun | Jul | Aug | Sep | Oct | Nov | Dec | Year |
|---|---|---|---|---|---|---|---|---|---|---|---|---|---|
| Record high °C (°F) | 15.5 (59.9) | 20.0 (68.0) | 25.3 (77.5) | 29.1 (84.4) | 32.4 (90.3) | 35.9 (96.6) | 35.7 (96.3) | 36.6 (97.9) | 36.2 (97.2) | 29.6 (85.3) | 26.0 (78.8) | 20.0 (68.0) | 36.6 (97.9) |
| Mean daily maximum °C (°F) | 4.0 (39.2) | 5.9 (42.6) | 10.5 (50.9) | 16.9 (62.4) | 22.6 (72.7) | 25.7 (78.3) | 28.7 (83.7) | 30.5 (86.9) | 25.6 (78.1) | 19.0 (66.2) | 13.1 (55.6) | 7.2 (45.0) | 17.5 (63.5) |
| Daily mean °C (°F) | −1.4 (29.5) | 0.0 (32.0) | 3.9 (39.0) | 9.8 (49.6) | 15.7 (60.3) | 19.6 (67.3) | 23.2 (73.8) | 24.3 (75.7) | 19.9 (67.8) | 13.4 (56.1) | 7.1 (44.8) | 1.7 (35.1) | 11.5 (52.7) |
| Mean daily minimum °C (°F) | −7.3 (18.9) | −6.1 (21.0) | −2.5 (27.5) | 2.7 (36.9) | 8.8 (47.8) | 14.2 (57.6) | 18.9 (66.0) | 19.6 (67.3) | 15.3 (59.5) | 8.2 (46.8) | 1.3 (34.3) | −4.0 (24.8) | 5.8 (42.4) |
| Record low °C (°F) | −17.2 (1.0) | −17.9 (−0.2) | −11.9 (10.6) | −8.8 (16.2) | −2.4 (27.7) | 3.2 (37.8) | 11.9 (53.4) | 9.8 (49.6) | 4.5 (40.1) | −3.2 (26.2) | −9.2 (15.4) | −13.7 (7.3) | −17.9 (−0.2) |
| Average precipitation mm (inches) | 34.6 (1.36) | 41.2 (1.62) | 79.8 (3.14) | 90.6 (3.57) | 103.0 (4.06) | 113.9 (4.48) | 147.4 (5.80) | 98.3 (3.87) | 143.2 (5.64) | 151.0 (5.94) | 59.7 (2.35) | 39.6 (1.56) | 1,102.2 (43.39) |
| Average precipitation days (≥ 1.0 mm) | 4.9 | 5.6 | 7.5 | 9.0 | 8.4 | 10.1 | 12.5 | 9.9 | 9.4 | 8.1 | 5.9 | 5.3 | 96.7 |
Source: Japan Meteorological Agency (2003–2020 normals, extremes 2003–present)

Climate data for Nagawa, Matsumoto (1991–2020 normals, extremes 1978–present)
| Month | Jan | Feb | Mar | Apr | May | Jun | Jul | Aug | Sep | Oct | Nov | Dec | Year |
|---|---|---|---|---|---|---|---|---|---|---|---|---|---|
| Record high °C (°F) | 12.4 (54.3) | 17.1 (62.8) | 22.6 (72.7) | 27.6 (81.7) | 30.9 (87.6) | 32.7 (90.9) | 33.8 (92.8) | 34.4 (93.9) | 32.3 (90.1) | 27.5 (81.5) | 23.3 (73.9) | 17.3 (63.1) | 34.4 (93.9) |
| Mean daily maximum °C (°F) | 1.6 (34.9) | 2.9 (37.2) | 7.2 (45.0) | 14.2 (57.6) | 19.9 (67.8) | 22.8 (73.0) | 26.3 (79.3) | 27.5 (81.5) | 22.9 (73.2) | 17.1 (62.8) | 11.2 (52.2) | 4.7 (40.5) | 14.9 (58.8) |
| Daily mean °C (°F) | −3.5 (25.7) | −2.9 (26.8) | 1.0 (33.8) | 7.0 (44.6) | 12.5 (54.5) | 16.3 (61.3) | 20.1 (68.2) | 20.7 (69.3) | 16.5 (61.7) | 10.2 (50.4) | 4.6 (40.3) | −0.6 (30.9) | 8.5 (47.3) |
| Mean daily minimum °C (°F) | −8.9 (16.0) | −9.0 (15.8) | −4.9 (23.2) | 0.2 (32.4) | 5.4 (41.7) | 10.8 (51.4) | 15.3 (59.5) | 15.8 (60.4) | 11.8 (53.2) | 4.9 (40.8) | −0.9 (30.4) | −5.6 (21.9) | 2.9 (37.2) |
| Record low °C (°F) | −20.4 (−4.7) | −20.9 (−5.6) | −17.4 (0.7) | −13.0 (8.6) | −4.5 (23.9) | 0.3 (32.5) | 6.6 (43.9) | 6.2 (43.2) | −1.3 (29.7) | −5.7 (21.7) | −11.6 (11.1) | −17.8 (0.0) | −20.9 (−5.6) |
| Average precipitation mm (inches) | 81.4 (3.20) | 92.7 (3.65) | 149.9 (5.90) | 151.6 (5.97) | 180.2 (7.09) | 221.3 (8.71) | 272.0 (10.71) | 162.5 (6.40) | 242.6 (9.55) | 188.0 (7.40) | 119.7 (4.71) | 84.9 (3.34) | 1,946.8 (76.65) |
| Average precipitation days (≥ 1.0 mm) | 11.6 | 10.6 | 12.6 | 12.0 | 12.2 | 14.2 | 16.3 | 12.2 | 12.6 | 11.1 | 10.0 | 12.2 | 147.5 |
| Mean monthly sunshine hours | 108.7 | 127.1 | 157.4 | 174.9 | 195.6 | 148.4 | 152.0 | 176.8 | 140.6 | 147.9 | 125.7 | 105.1 | 1,759.5 |
Source: Japan Meteorological Agency (1991–2020 normals, extremes 1978–present)

== Demographics ==
Per Japanese census data, the population of Matsumoto has recently plateaued and decreased slightly after a long period of growth through the 20th century.

Historical population
| Year | Pop. | ±% |
|---|---|---|
| 1940 | 154,182 | — |
| 1950 | 183,775 | +19.2% |
| 1960 | 190,076 | +3.4% |
| 1970 | 203,571 | +7.1% |
| 1980 | 223,496 | +9.8% |
| 1990 | 233,756 | +4.6% |
| 2000 | 243,465 | +4.2% |
| 2010 | 243,070 | −0.2% |
| 2020 | 241,145 | −0.8% |

== Government ==
Matsumoto has a mayor-council form of government with a directly elected mayor and a unicameral city legislature of 31 members. The city contributes six members to the Nagano Prefectural Assembly. In terms of national politics, Matsumoto is grouped with Ōmachi, Azumino, Higashichikuma District, Nagano, Kitaazumi District, Nagano, Kamiminochi District, Nagano and part of the city of Nagano to form Nagano 2nd District in the lower house of the National Diet.

=== List of Matsumoto mayors (since 1937) ===
- Yorinaga Ori (小里頼永) July 1937 to August 1937
- Okimasa Momose (百瀬興政) August 1937 to April 1939
- Wataru Momose (百瀬 渡) April 1940 to April 1944
- Morito Hirabayashi (平林盛人) May 1944 to March 1945
- Yasushi Hirayama (平山 泰) July 1945 to March 1946
- Ikuichi Akahane (赤羽幾一) June 1946 to December 1946
- Naohisa Tsutsui (筒井直久) April 1947 to April 1951
- Bunshichiro Matsuoka(松岡文七郎) April 1951 to January 1957
- Tokuya Furuhata (降旗徳弥) March 1957 to March 1969
- Matsumi Fukasawa (深沢松美) March 1969 to March 1976
- Shoji Wago (和合正治) March 1976 to March 1992
- Tadashi Aruga (有賀 正) March 1992 to March 2004
- Akira Sugenoya (菅谷 昭) March 2004 to March 2020
- Yoshinao Gaun (臥雲義尚) March 2020 to present

== Economy ==
Matsumoto is a regional commercial center and noted for traditional woodworking and silk spinning, electronics and its dairy industry. Seasonal tourism to the surrounding mountains and onsen hot spring resorts is also an important source of local income.

== Education ==
=== Universities and colleges ===
- Shinshu University
- Matsumoto University
- Matsusho Gakuen Junior College
- Matsumoto Junior College

=== Primary and secondary education ===
Matsumoto has 29 public elementary schools operated by the city government, one operated by the national government and one private elementary school. The city also manages 19 public middle schools, with one more middle school shared between Matsumoto and neighbouring Asahi. There is one public middle school operated by the national government and one private middle school. The city has seven public high schools operated by the Nagano Prefectural Board of Education and six private high schools. The city also has a North Korean school, Nagano Korean Elementary and Junior High School (長野朝鮮初中級学校).

Kaichi School opened in 1876; farmers gave 70% of the funds to have it built. According to Philippe Mesmer of Le Monde, Kaichi "was one of the first modern schools built in Japan." After the school closed, it was converted into a museum.

== Transportation ==
=== Airport ===
The city is served by Matsumoto Airport. However, the airport only provides limited domestic routes. The nearest airports are:

- Toyama Airport, located 184 km (114 mi) north west.
- Chubu Centrair International Airport, located 255 km (158 mi) south west.
- Haneda Airport, located 239 km (149 mi) south east.
- Narita International Airport, located 293 km (182 mi) south east.

=== Railway ===
- East Japan Railway Company – Shinonoi Line
  - Murai – Hirata – Minami-Matsumoto – Matsumoto
- East Japan Railway Company – Ōito Line
  - Matsumoto – Kita-Matsumoto – Shimauchi – Shimatakamatsu
- Alpico Kōtsū – Kamikōchi Line
  - Matsumoto – Nishi-Matsumoto – Nagisa – Shinano-Arai – Ōniwa – Shimonii – Kitanii-Matsumotodaigakumae – Niimura – Samizo – Moriguchi – Shimojima – Hata – Endō – Shin-Shimashima

=== Highway ===
- Nagano Expressway
- National Route 19
- National Route 143
- National Route 147
- National Route 158
- National Route 254
- National Route 403

== Sister cities ==
=== Domestic ===
- (Japan) Fujisawa, Kanagawa, from July 29, 1961
- (Japan) Himeji, Hyōgo, from November 17, 1966
- (Japan) Takayama, Gifu, from November 1, 1971

=== International ===
- Salt Lake City, Utah, United States, from 1958
- Kathmandu, Nepal, from November 17, 1989
- Langfang, Hebei, China, friendship city from March 21, 1995
- Grindelwald, Canton of Bern, Switzerland, from April 20, 1972
- Salzburg, Salzburg (state), Austria, from July 25, 2026

== Local attractions ==
Matsumoto is attractive to travelers not only because of its traditional culture but also its moderate climate and local products. Matsumoto soba is famous for its delicate taste. Local attractions include:

- Asama Onsen
- Hayashi Castle, Sengoku period castle ruins, a National Historic Site
- Kaichi School Museum, Meiji period building housing the first middle school in Japan
- Kamikōchi mountain area
- The Kiso Valley, a valley located Southwest of Matsumoto along which the historic Nakasendo route of the Edo period went through
- Kōbōyama Kofun, Kofun period burial mound, a National Historic Site
- Matsumoto Castle, built more than 400 years ago. It is a Japanese National Treasure
- Saito Kinen Festival Matsumoto, held every August by conductor Seiji Ozawa and featuring the Saito Kinen Orchestra
- Matsumoto Castle Projection Mapping, A projection mapping event that began in 2021. It was planned to attract more visitors during the winter season, when tourist numbers tend to decline, and the number of attendees has increased every year. 2025 season, it reached a record high of 170,000 visitors.

Outside the rail station is also a statue of a little girl with a violin, commemorating the Suzuki method of teaching music, created by Shinichi Suzuki who lived in the city in his later life.

=== Sports ===
Matsumoto is represented in the J. League of football with its local club, Matsumoto Yamaga FC based at the Alwin Stadium in Kambayashi.

It was one of the host cities of the official Women's Volleyball World Championship for its 1998 and 2010 editions.

Yoshinori Ueda was born here.

== In popular culture ==
- Hakusen Nagashi – series of television dramas starting in 1996.
- Orange – manga series written by Ichigo Takano
- Perfect World – manga series written by Rie Aruga
- King Ghidorah attacked Matsumoto in his debut film Ghidorah, the Three-Headed Monster and Godzilla Minus Zero, the latter of which was directed by Matsumoto native Takashi Yamazaki.

== Gallery ==
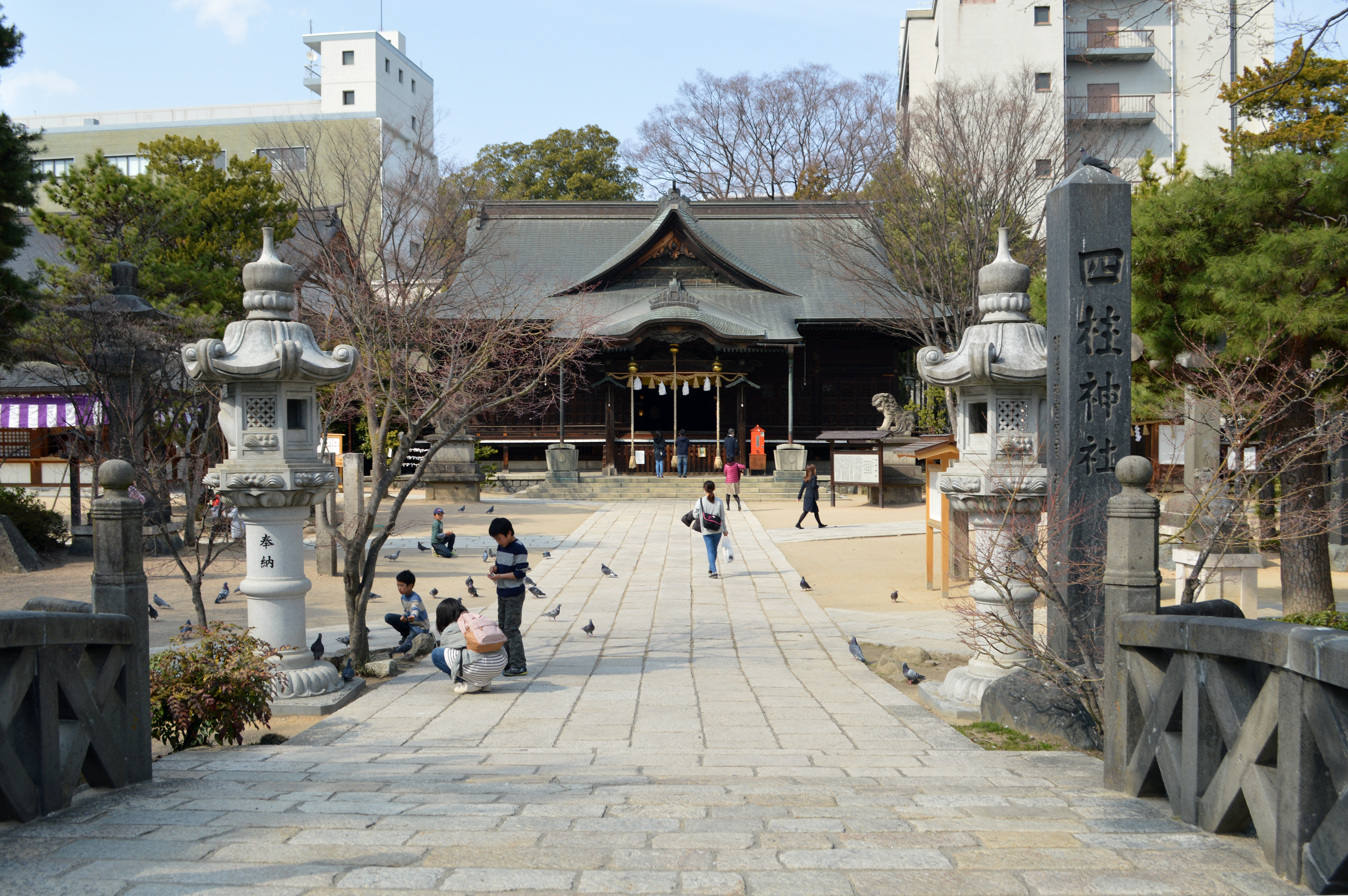
Four Pillars Shrine

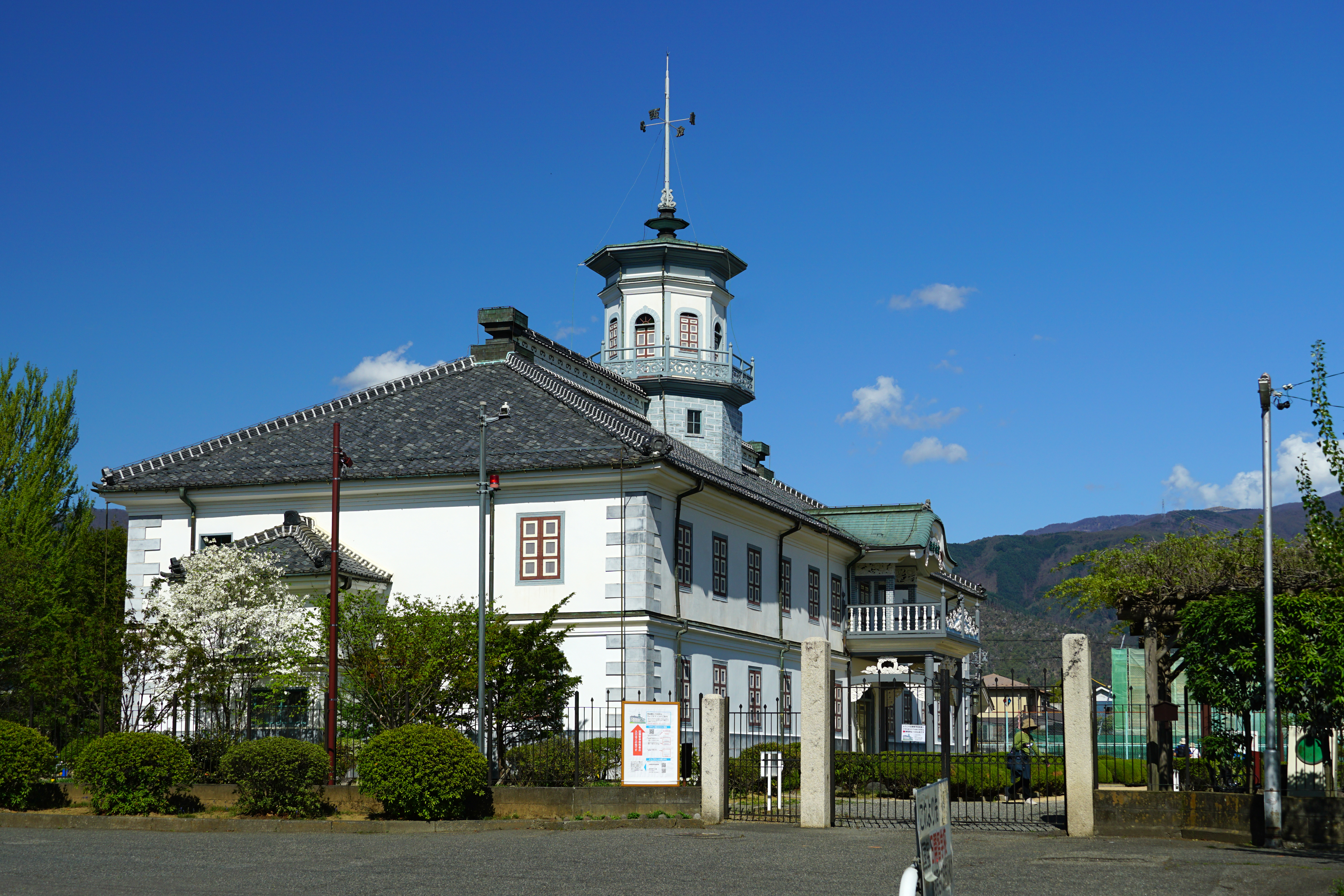
Kaichi School

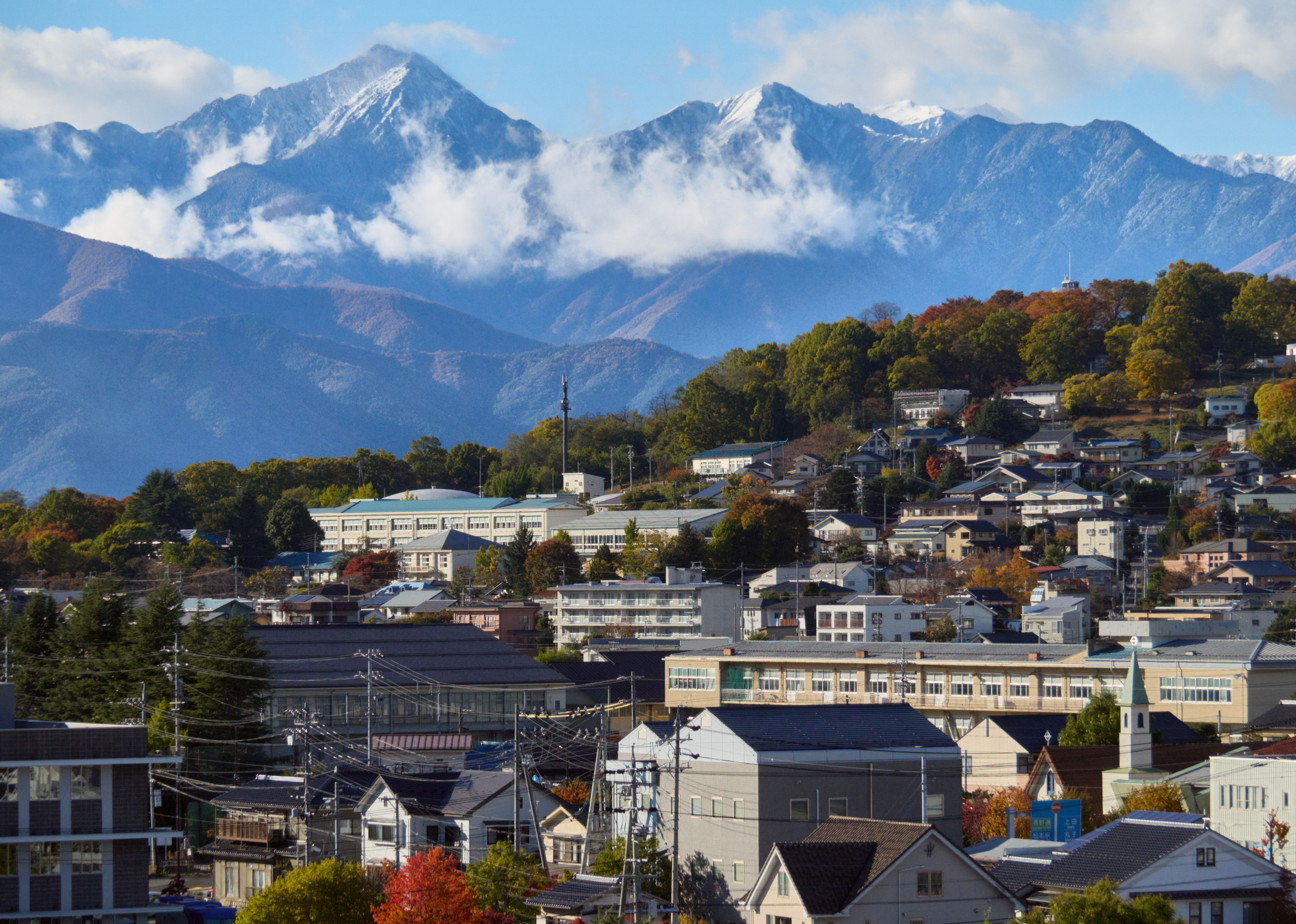
Matsumoto cityscape, from Matsumoto Castle

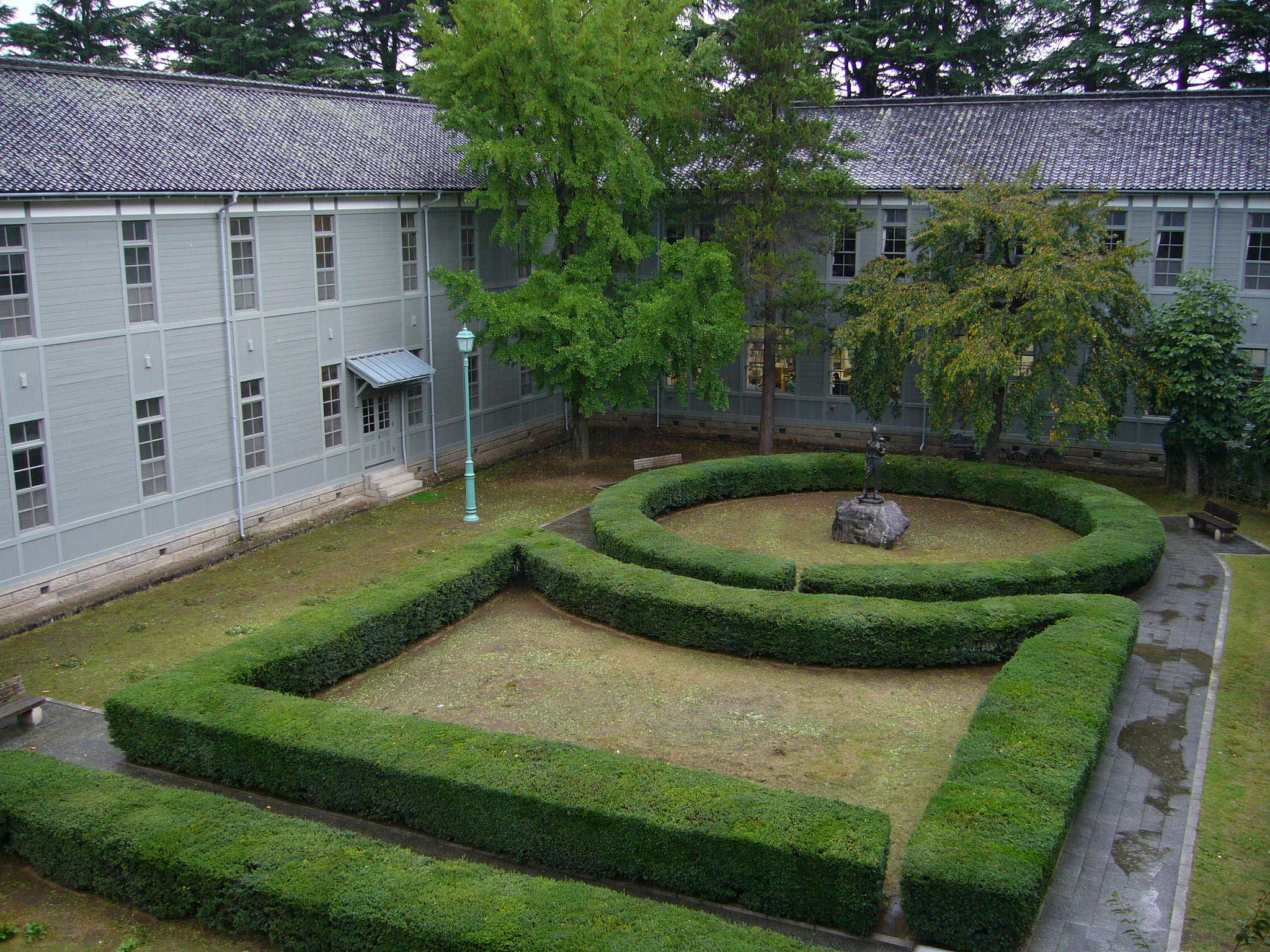
Garden in former Matsumoto High School (present day of Shinshu University)

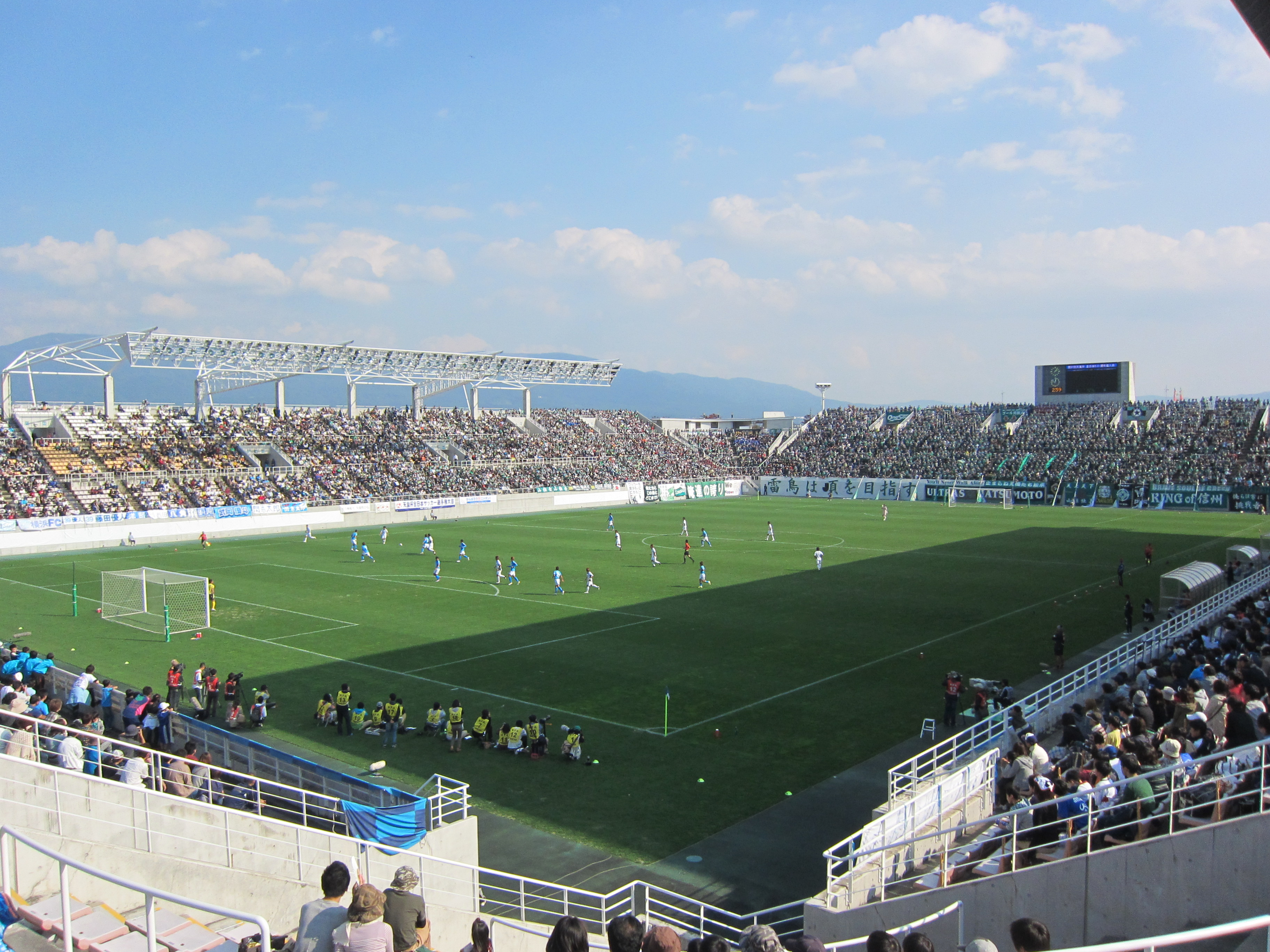
Matsumoto Alwin football stadium

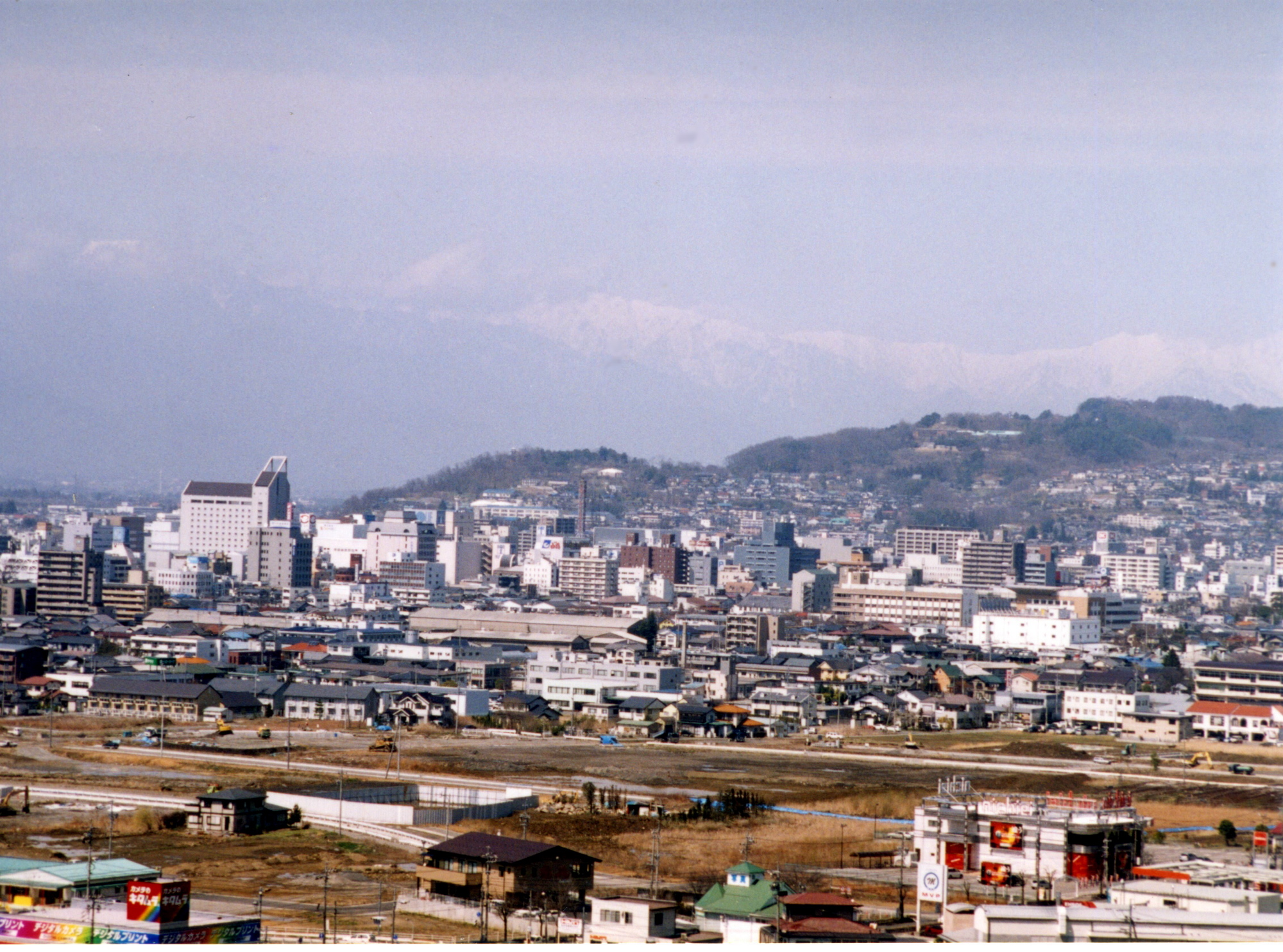
View of downtown Matsumoto from Mount Koubou

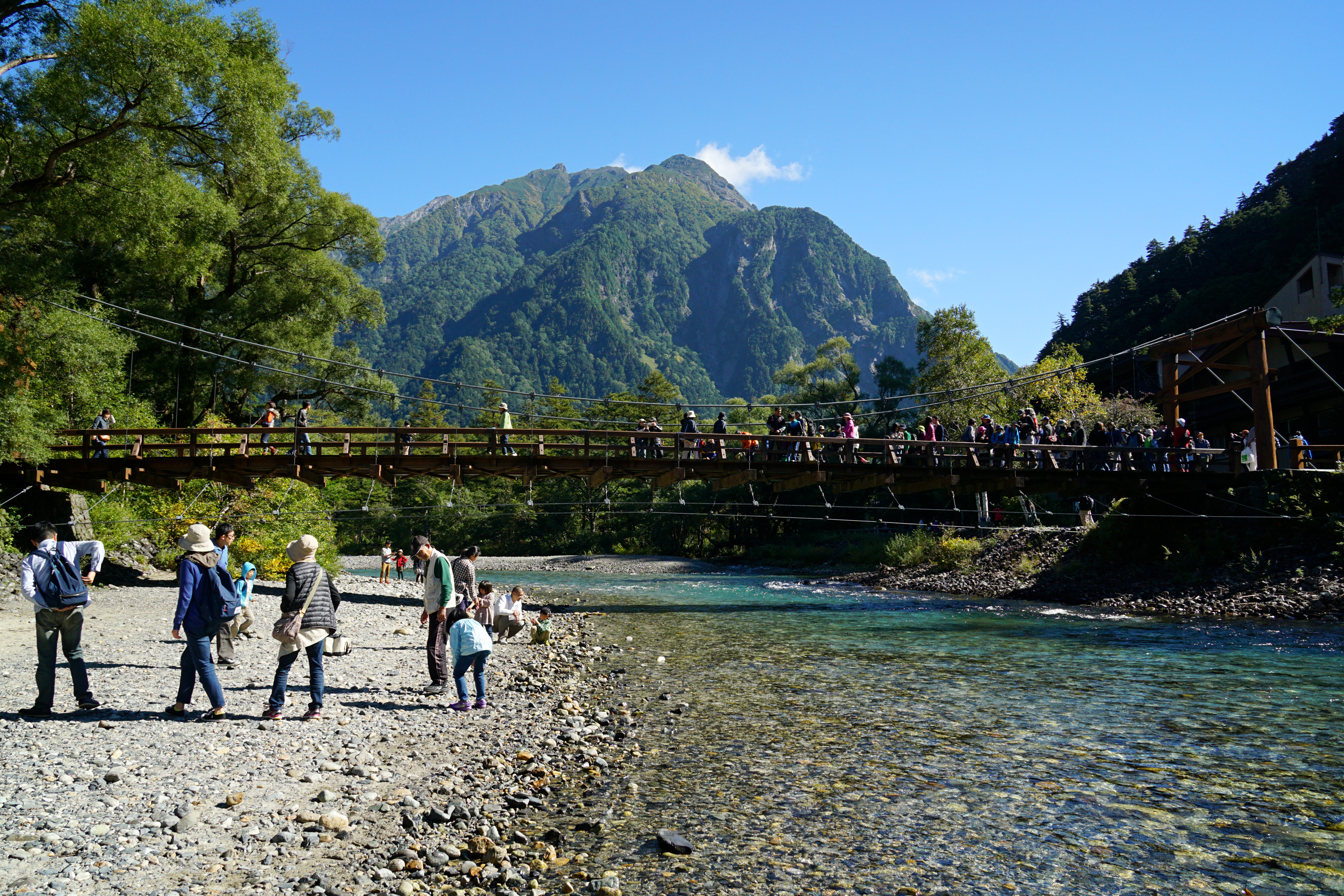
Kappa Bridge in Kamikōchi

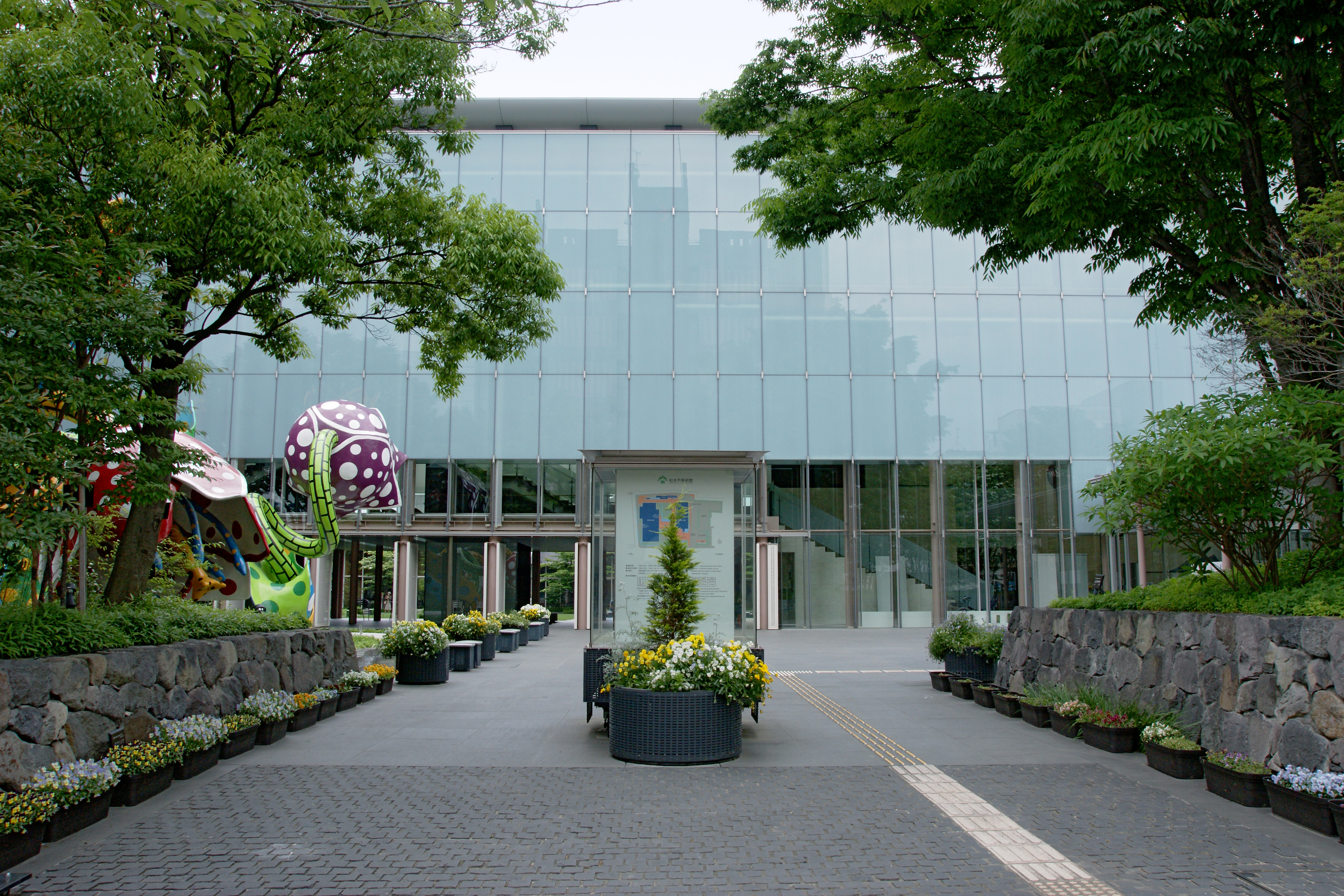
Matsumoto City Museum of Art

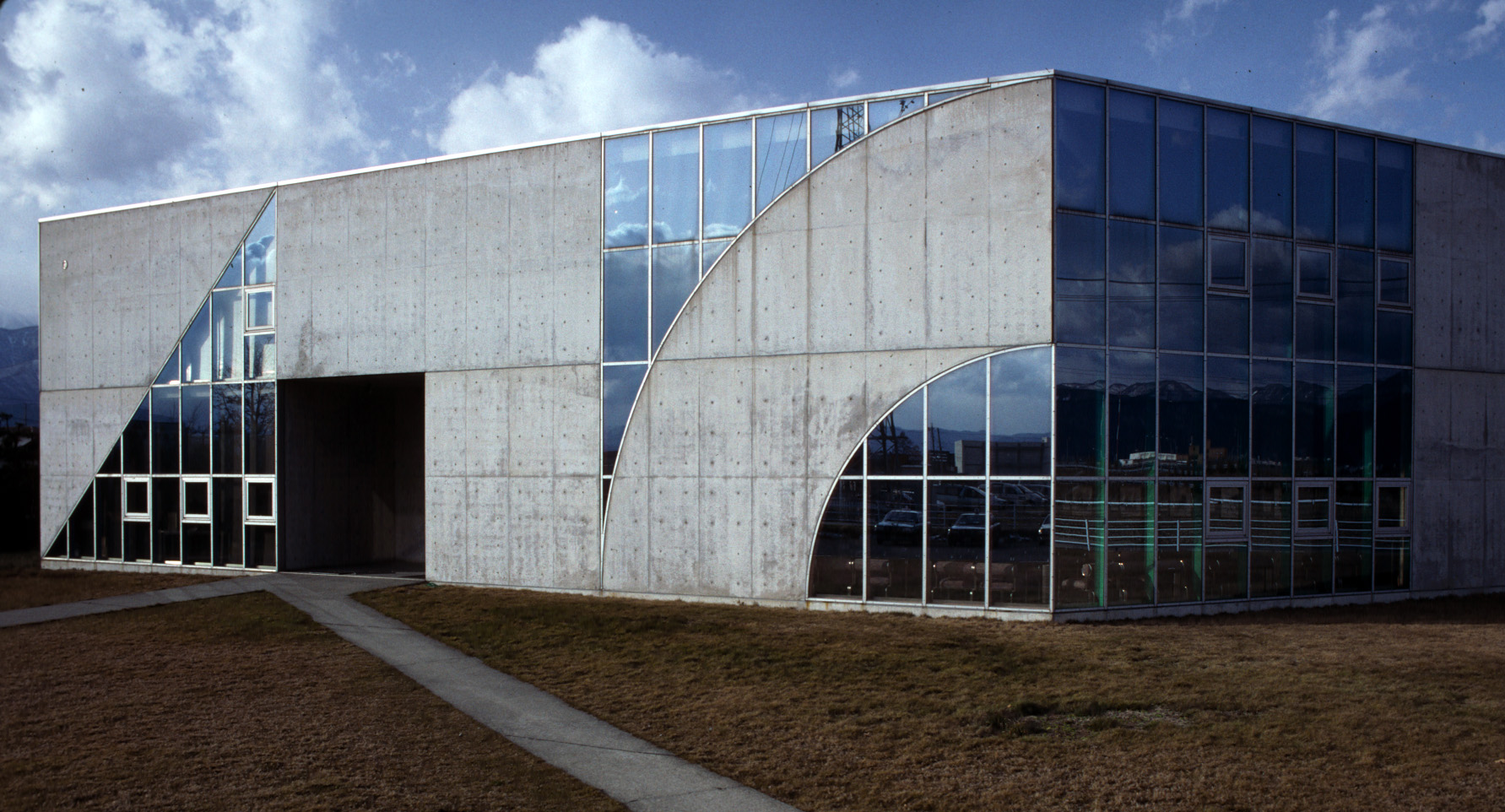
Matsumoto Ukiyoe Museum

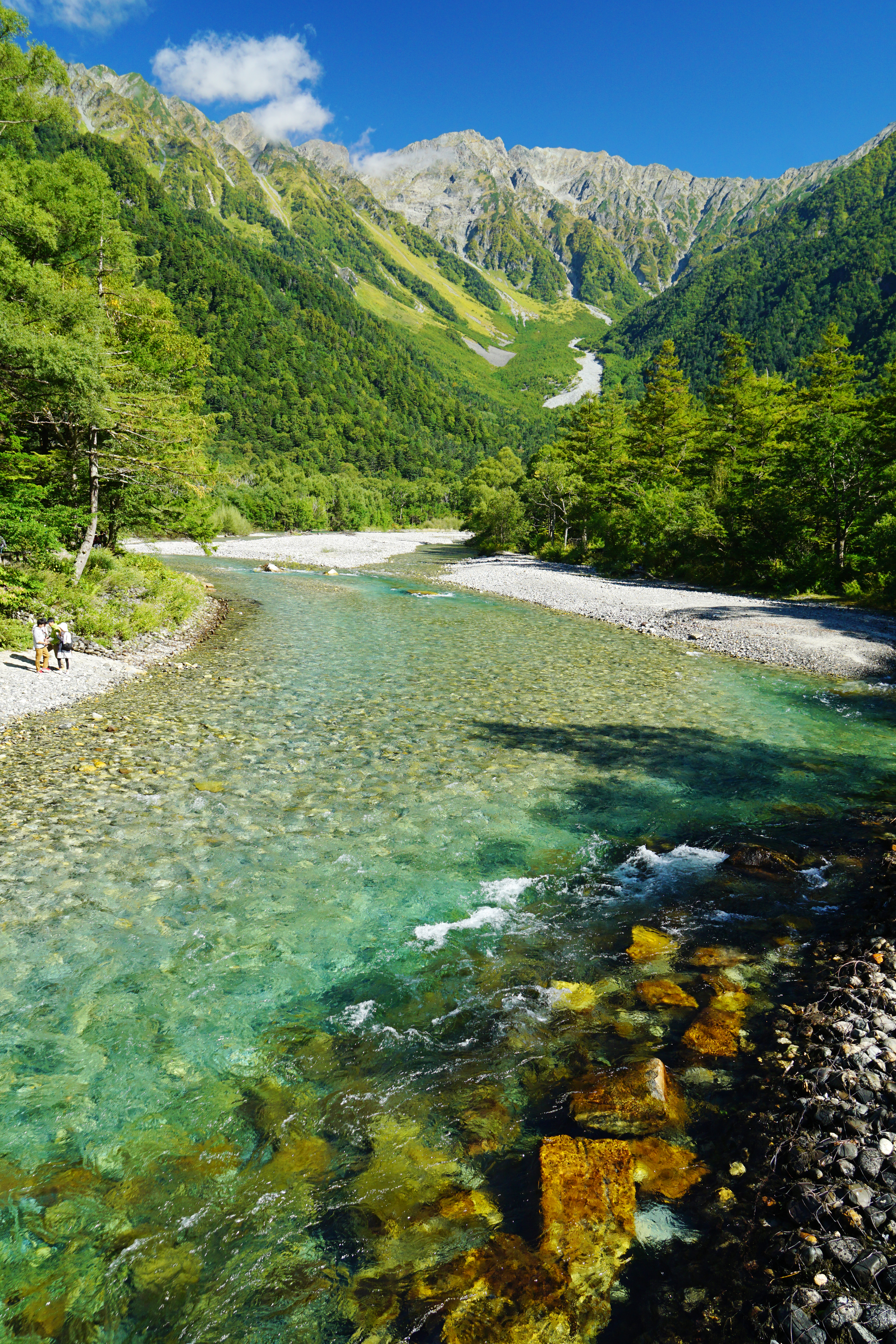
Azusa River in Kamikōchi

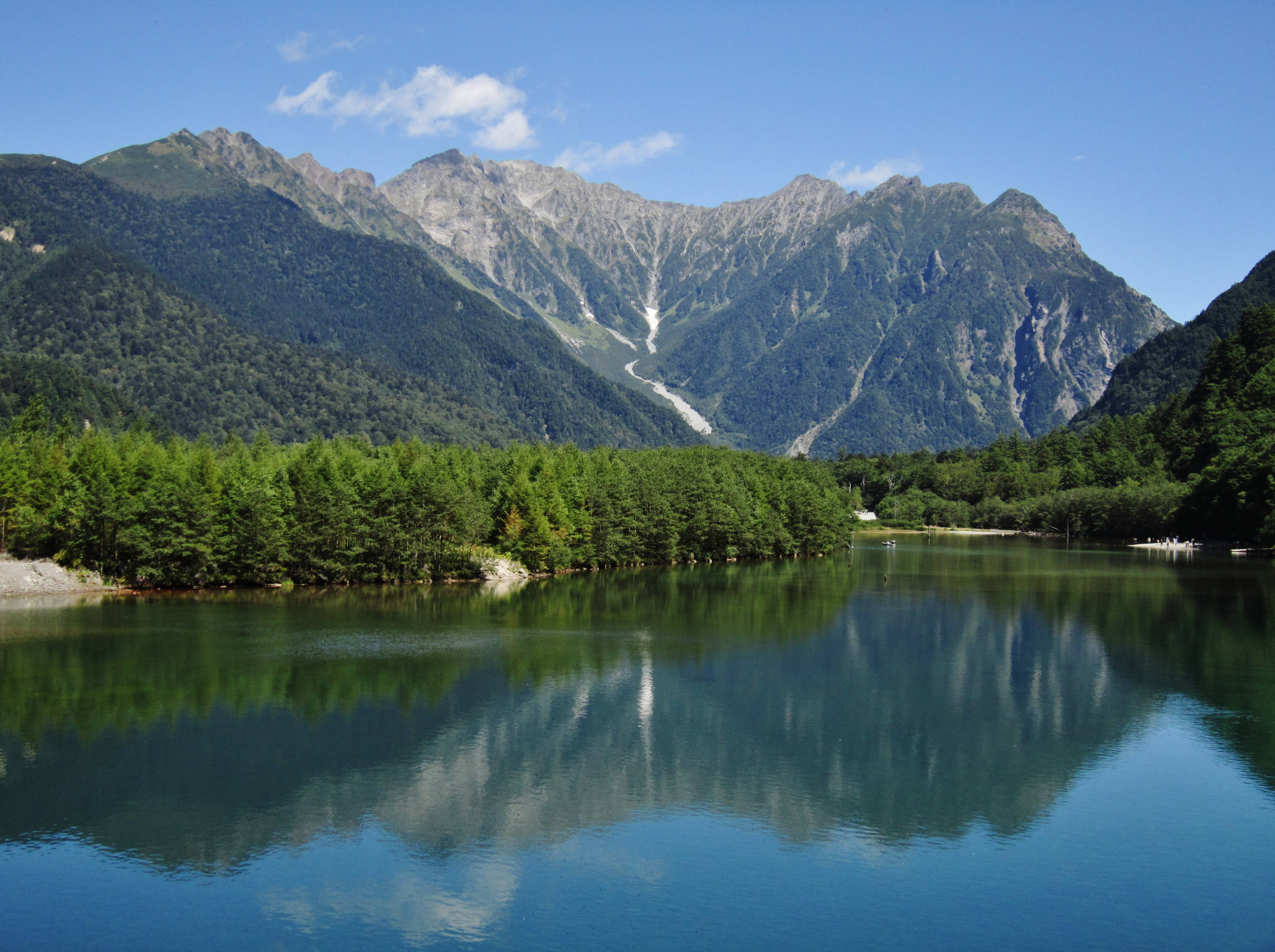
Taisho Pond in Kamikōchi

== Notable people ==
- Shōichi Fujimori
- Akira Iwai
- Akiko Kumai
- Yayoi Kusama
- Masao Oka
- Takashi Yamazaki
