= Toyota, Nagano =

Dissolved municipality in Nagano prefecture, Japan

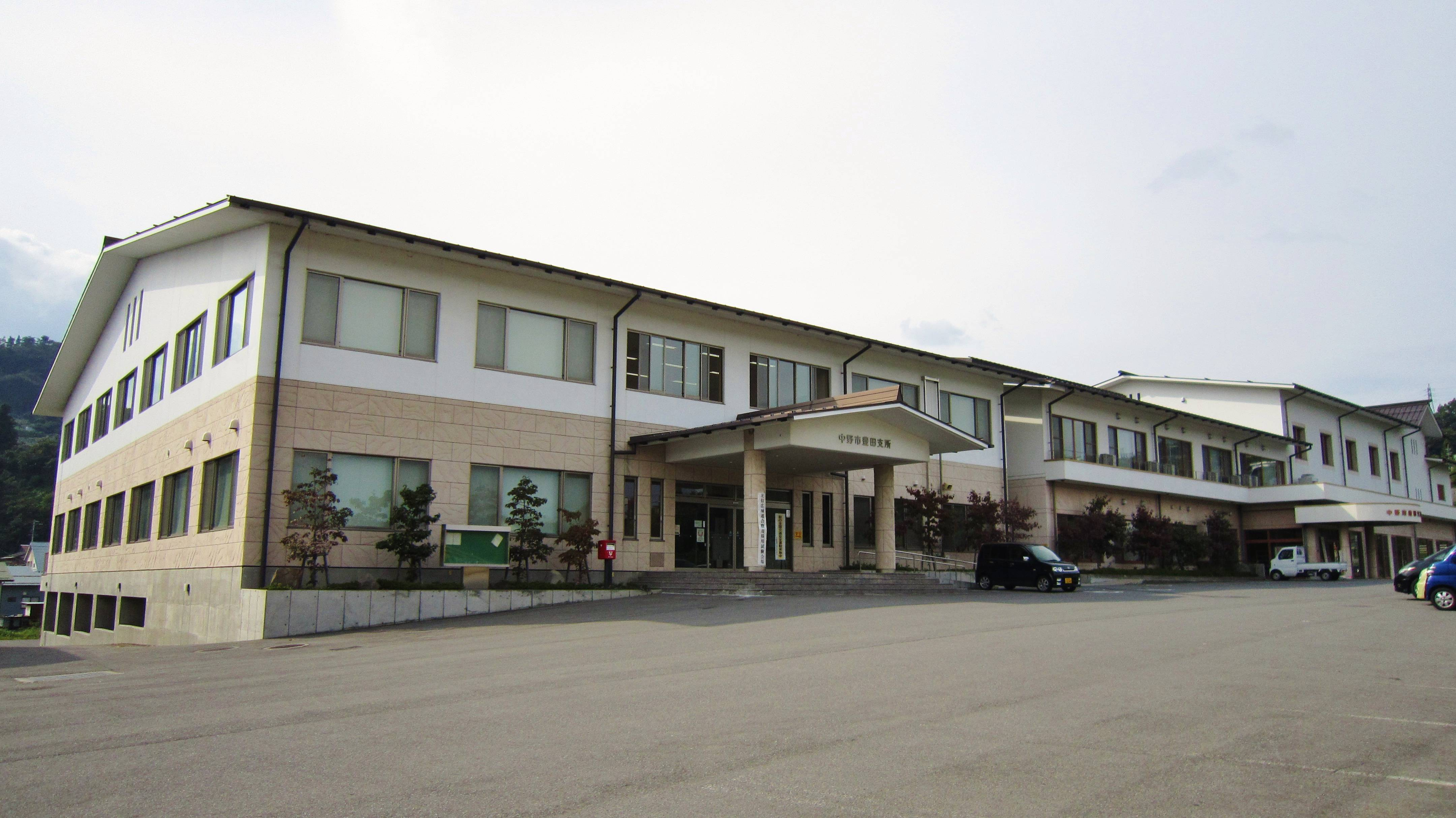
former Toyota town hall

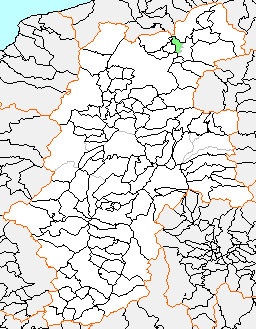
Location of Toyota in Nagano Prefecture

Toyota (豊田村, Toyota-mura) was a village located in Shimominochi District, Nagano Prefecture, Japan.

As of 2003, the village had an estimated population of 5,116 and a density of 147.27 persons per km^{2}. The total area was 34.74 km^{2}.

On April 1, 2005, Toyota was merged into the expanded city of Nakano.
