= Toyoshina, Nagano =

Dissolved municipality in Nagano prefecture, Japan

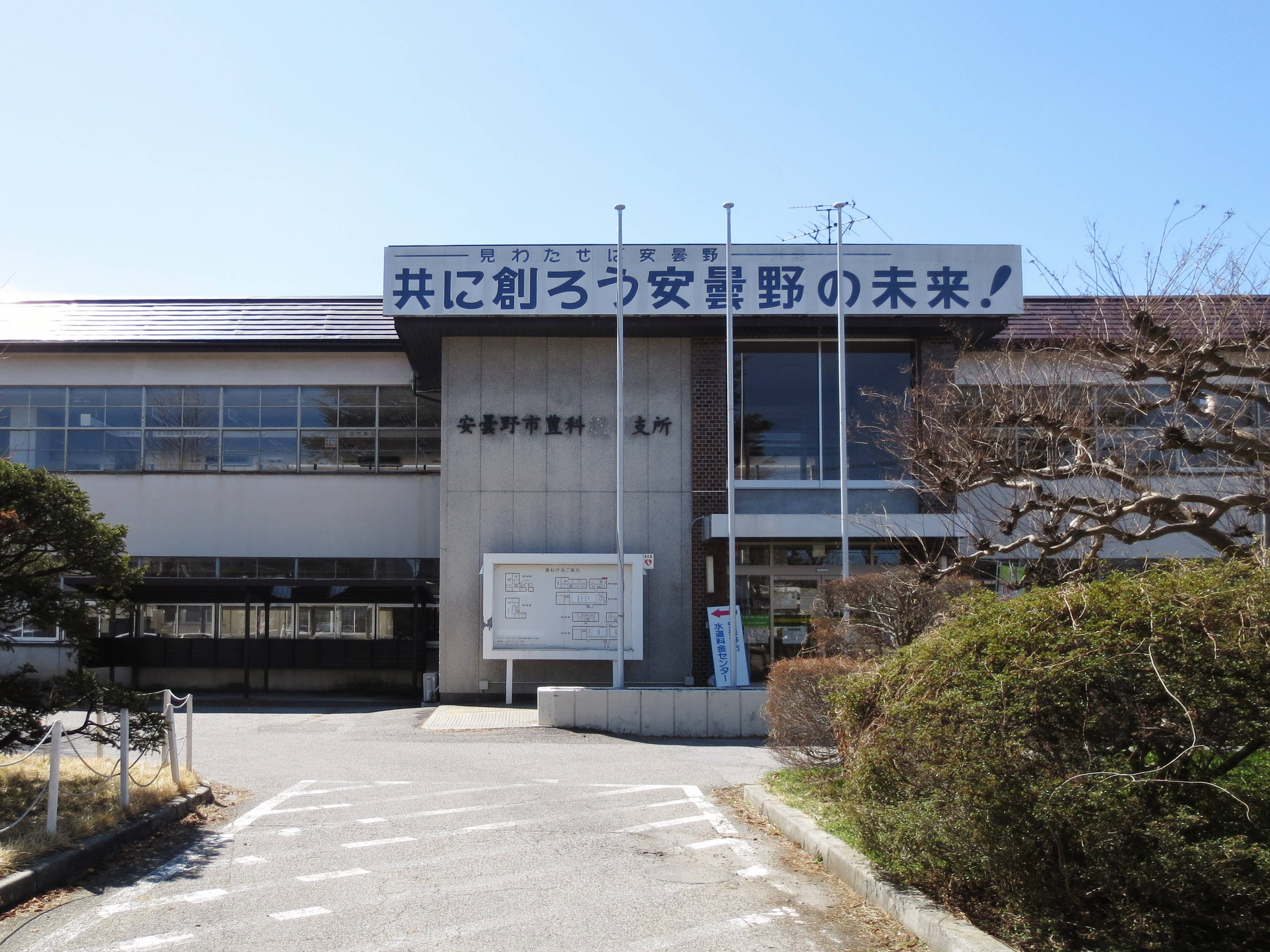
former Toyoshina town hall, now the Azumino City Toyoshina Branch

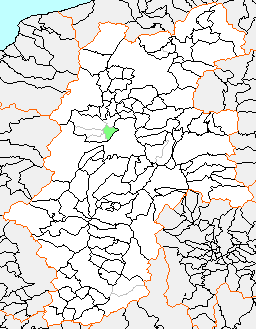
Map of Toyoshina, Nagano

Toyoshina (豊科町, Toyoshina-machi) was a town located in Minamiazumi District, Nagano Prefecture, Japan.

As of 2003, the town has an estimated population of 27,546 and a density of 704.32 persons per km^{2}. The total area is 39.11 km^{2}.

On October 1, 2005, Toyoshina, along with the town of Akashina (from Higashichikuma District), the town of Hotaka, and the villages of Horigane and Misato (all from Minamiazumi District), was merged to create the city of Azumino.

The name Toyoshina is an acronym of the four antecedent villages: Toba, Yoshino, Shinden, and Nariai.
