= Hotaka, Nagano =

Dissolved municipality in Minamiazumi district, Nagano prefecture, Japan

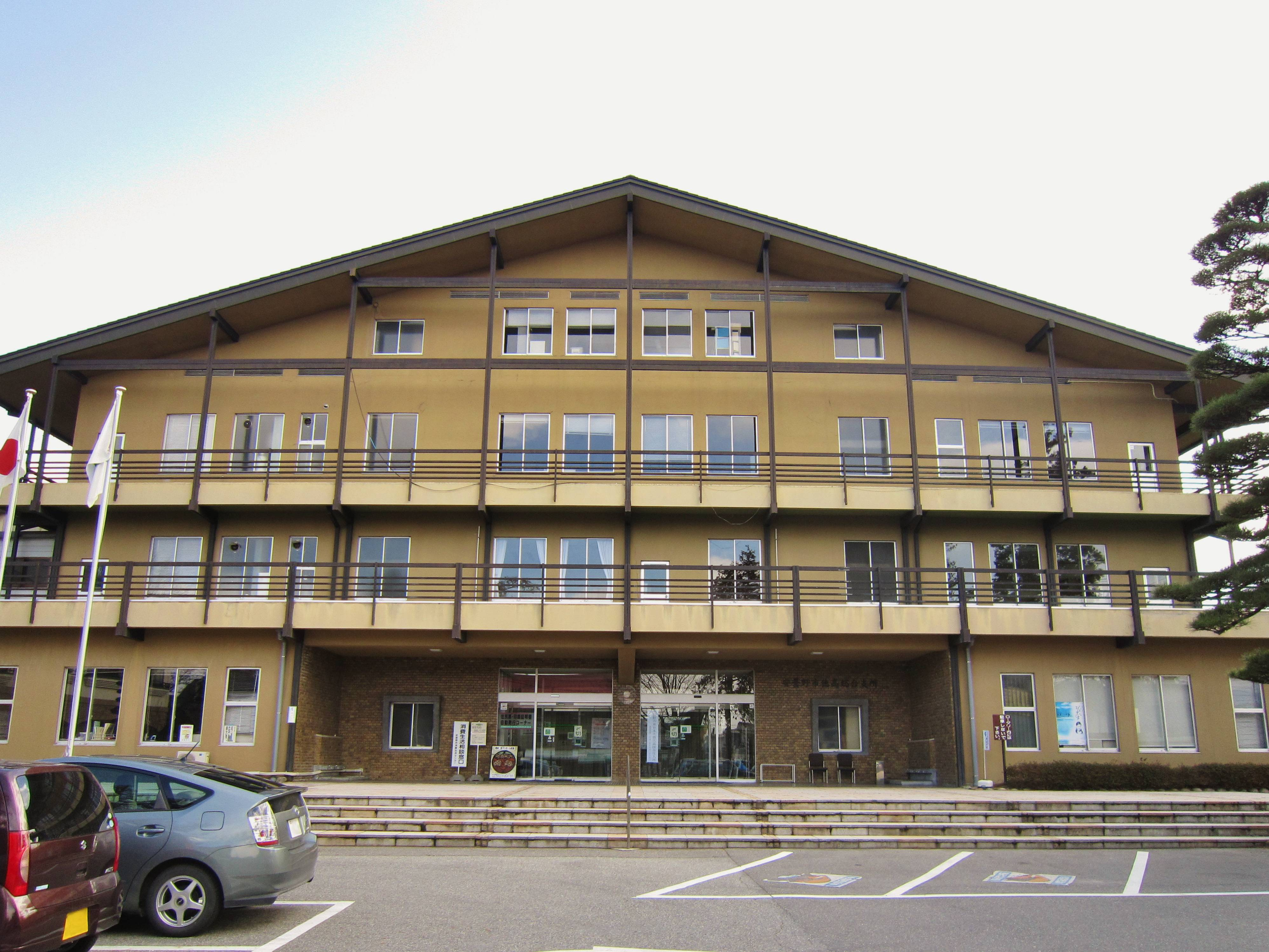
former Hotaka town hall

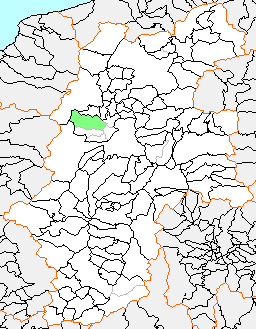
Map of Hotaka, Nagano

Hotaka (穂高町, Hotaka-machi) was a town located in Minamiazumi District, Nagano Prefecture, Japan.

As of 2003, the town had an estimated population of 31,980 and a density of 219.91 persons per km^{2}. The total area was 145.42 km^{2}.

On October 1, 2005, Hotaka, along with the town of Akashina (from Higashichikuma District), the town of Toyoshina, and the villages of Horigane and Misato (all from Minamiazumi District), was merged to create the city of Azumino.
