= Horigane, Nagano =

Dissolved municipality in Nagano prefecture, Japan

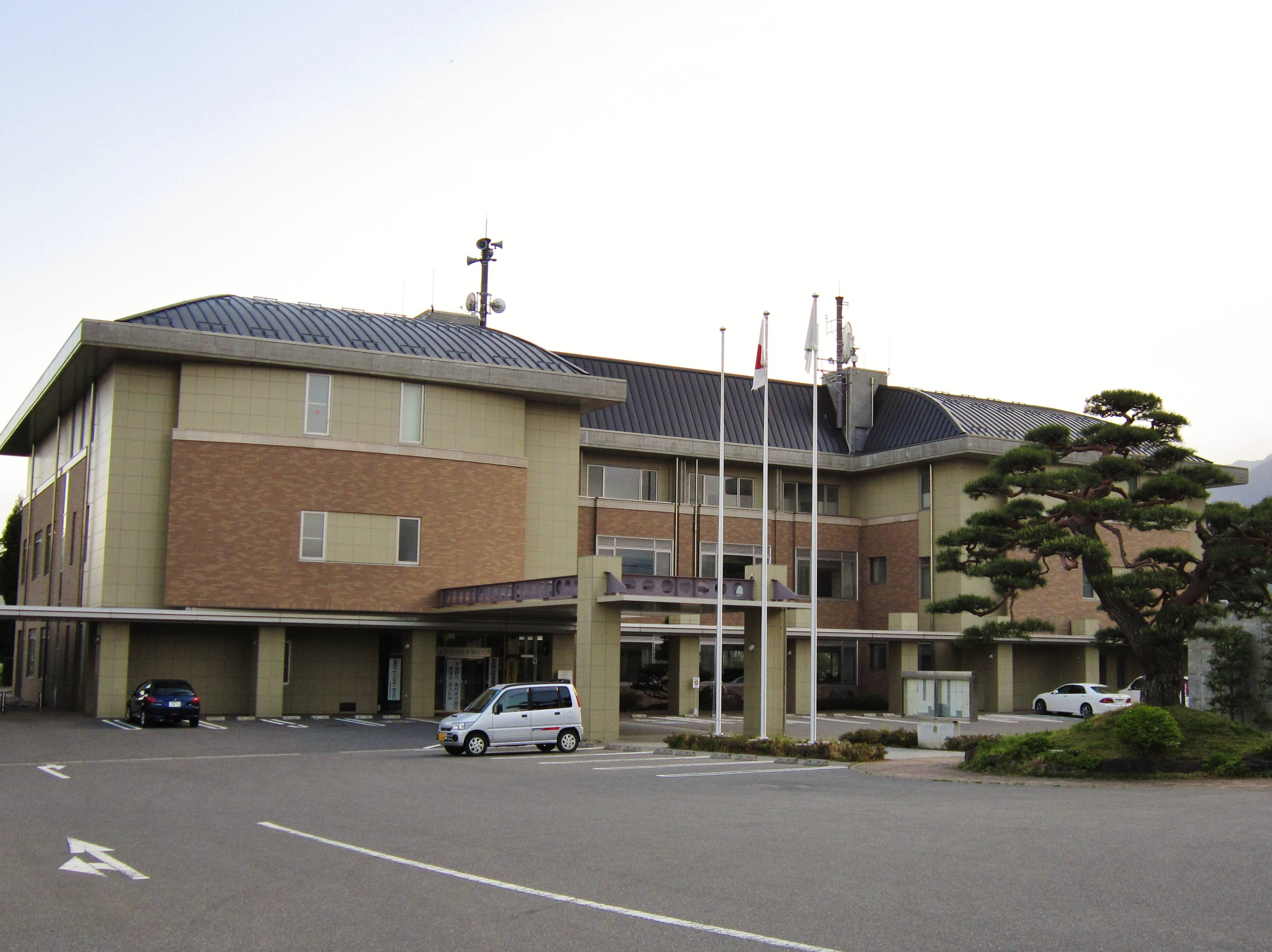
former Horigane village hall

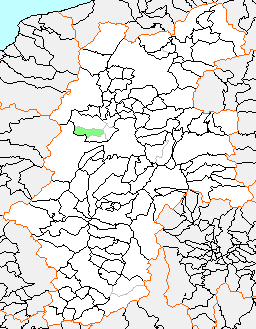
Map of Horigane, Nagano

Horigane (堀金村, Horigane-mura) was a village located in Minamiazumi District, Nagano Prefecture, Japan.

As of 2003, the village had an estimated population of 8,768 and a density of 134.98 persons per km^{2}. The total area was 64.96 km^{2}.

On October 1, 2005, Horigane, along with the town of Akashina (from Higashichikuma District), the towns of Hotaka and Toyoshina, and the village of Misato (all from Minamiazumi District), was merged to create the city of Azumino.
