= Kami, Nagano =

Dissolved municipality in Nagano prefecture, Japan

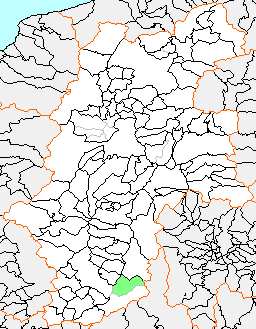
Map of Kami, Nagano

Kami (上村, Kami-mura) was a village located in Shimoina District, Nagano Prefecture, Japan.

As of 2003, the village had an estimated population of 811 and a density of 6.41 persons per km^{2}. The total area was 126.51 km^{2}.

On October 1, 2005, Kami, along with the village of Minamishinano (also from Shimoina District), was merged into the city of Iida.
