= Akashina, Nagano =

Dissolved municipality in Nagano prefecture, Japan

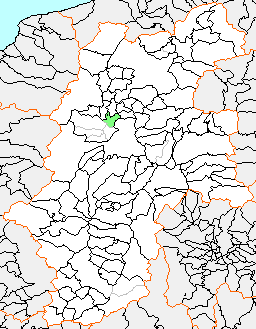
Map of Akashina, Nagano

Akashina (明科町, Akashina-machi) was a town located in Higashichikuma District, Nagano Prefecture, Japan.

As of 2003, the town had an estimated population of 9,556 and a density of 226.88 persons per km^{2}. The total area was 42.12 km^{2}.

On October 1, 2005, Akashina, along with the towns of Hotaka and Toyoshina, and the villages of Horigane and Misato (all from Minamiazumi District), was merged to create the city of Azumino.
