= Misato, Nagano =

Dissolved municipality in Nagano prefecture, Japan

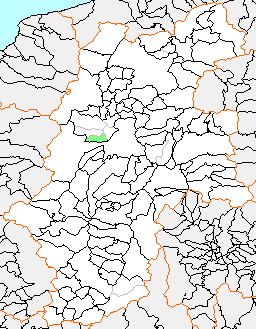
Map of Misato, Nagano

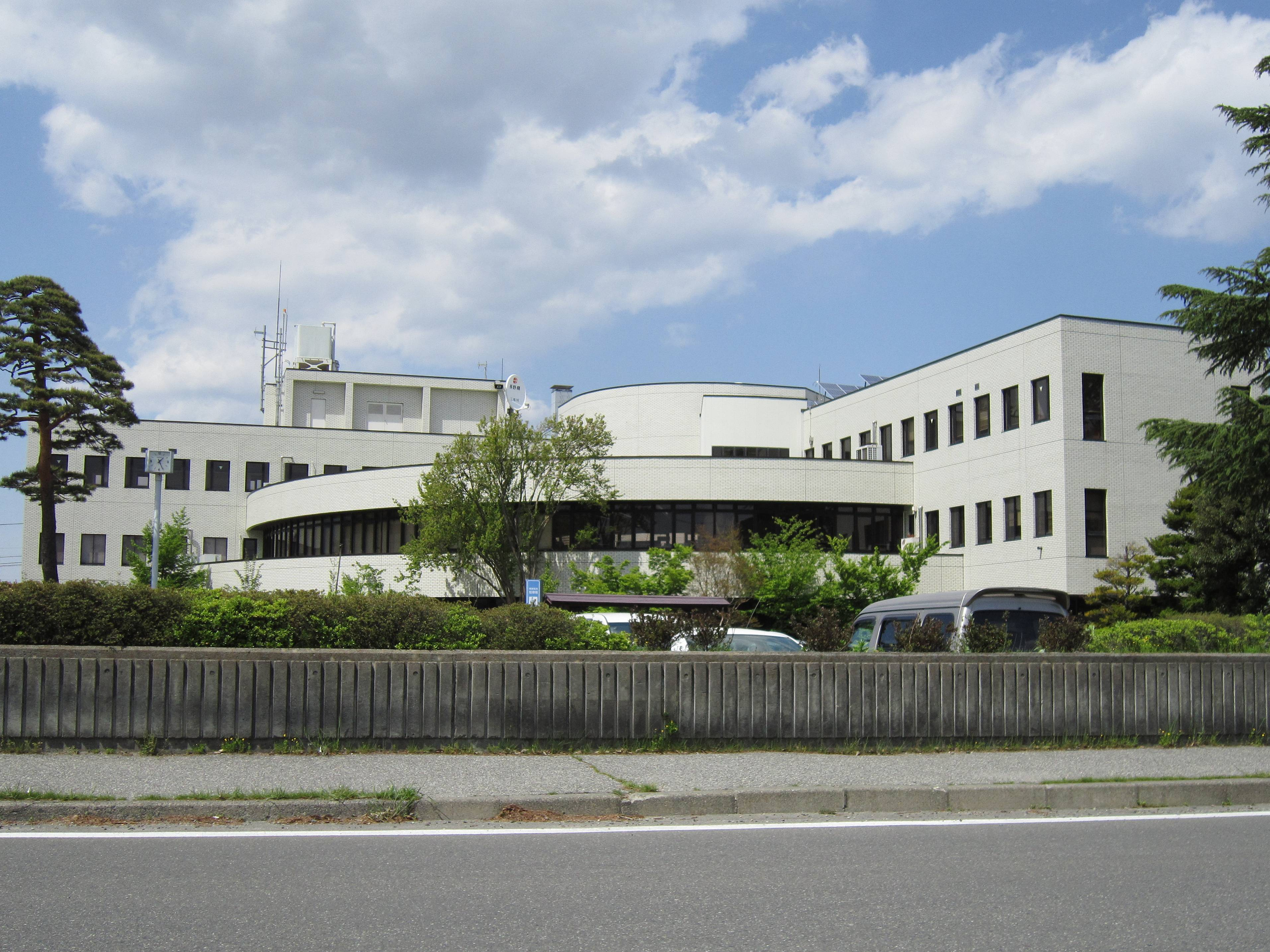
former Misato Town Hall

Misato (三郷村, Misato-mura) was a village located in Minamiazumi District, Nagano Prefecture, Japan.

As of 2003, the village had an estimated population of 17,120 and a density of 425.76 persons per km^{2}. The total area was 40.21 km^{2}.

On October 1, 2005, Misato, was merged with the town of Akashina (from Higashichikuma District), the towns of Hotaka and Toyoshina, and the village of Horigane (all from Minamiazumi District), was merged to create the city of Azumino.
