= Minamishinano, Nagano =

Dissolved municipality in Shimoina district, Nagano prefecture, Japan

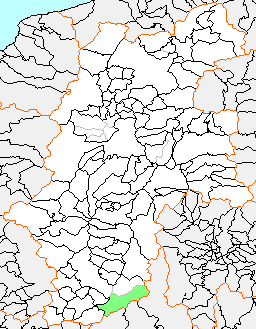
Map of Minamishinano, Nagano

Minamishinano (南信濃村, Minamishinano-mura) was a village located in Shimoina District, Nagano Prefecture, Japan.

As of 2003, the village had an estimated population of 2,250 and a density of 10.87 persons per km^{2}. The total area was 206.90 km^{2}.

On October 1, 2005, Minamishinano, along with the village of Kami (also from Shimoina District), was merged into the city of Iida.
