= Minamiazumi District, Nagano =

Former district in Nagano prefecture, Japan

Minamiazumi (南安曇郡, Minamiazumi-gun) was a district located in Nagano Prefecture, Japan.

As of 2003, the district had an estimated population of 99,785 with a density of 117.22 persons per km^{2}. The total area was 851.25 km^{2}.

== Municipalities ==
Prior to its dissolution, the district consisted of two towns and two villages:

- Horigane (Note: Classified as a village.)
- Hotaka (Note: Classified as a town.)
- Misato
- Toyoshina

== History ==
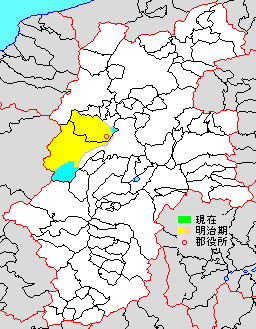
Map showing original extent of Minamiazumi District in Nagano Prefecture: * yellow - areas formerly within the district borders during the early Meiji period

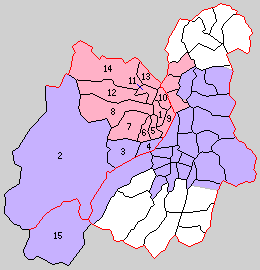
Colored areas are in this district.

=== District Timeline ===
- 1878 - Founded after Azumi District was split into Minamiazumi and Kitaazumi Districts.

=== Recent mergers ===
- On April 1, 2005 - The villages of Nagawa, Azumi and Azusagawa were merged into the expanded city of Matsumoto.
- On October 1, 2005 - The towns of Hotaka and Toyoshina, and the villages of Horigane and Misato, along with the town of Akashina (from Higashichikuma District) were merged to form the city of Azumino. Minamiazumi District was dissolved as a result of this merger.

== See also ==
- List of dissolved districts of Japan
