= Higashichikuma District, Nagano =

District in Nagano Prefecture, Japan

Coordinates: 36°25′41″N 138°00′36″E

Higashichikuma (東筑摩郡, Higashichikuma-gun) is a district located in Nagano Prefecture, Japan.

As of October 1, 2011, the district has an estimated population of 23,044 with a density of 85.85 persons per km^{2}. The total area is 268.42 km^{2}. Northern Higashichikuma has its population increased, while Southern Higashichikuma has theirs decreased.

== Municipalities ==
The district consists of five villages:

- Asahi (Note: Classified as a village.)
- Chikuhoku
- Ikusaka
- Omi
- Yamagata

== History ==
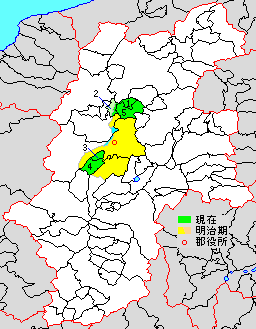
Map showing original extent of Higashichikuma District in Nagano Prefecture: * yellow - areas formerly within the district borders during the early Meiji period: 1. Omi-mura; 2. Ikusaka-mura; 3. Yamagata-mura; 4. Asahi-mura; 5. Chikuhoku-mura

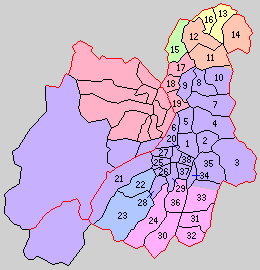
Colored areas are in this district.

=== District Timeline ===
- April 1, 1959 - The town of Shiojiri absorbed the villages of Kataoka, Hirooka, Souga and Chikumaji to form the city of Shiojiri.
- June 28, 1961 - The village of Seba was merged into the expanded city of Shiojiri.
- April 1, 1973 - The village of Hata gained town status.
- May 1, 1974 - The village of Hongo was merged into the expanded city of Matsumoto.

=== Recent mergers ===
- April 1, 2005 - The village of Shiga was merged into the expanded city of Matsumoto.
- October 1, 2005 - The town of Akashina was merged with the towns of Hotaka and Toyoshina, and the villages of Horigane and Misato (all from Minamiazumi District) to form the new city of Azumino.
- October 11, 2005 - The villages of Honjō, Sakakita and Sakai merged to form the new village of Chikuhoku.
- March 31, 2010 - The town of Hata was merged into the expanded city of Matsumoto.

== Sister cities ==
The district has a sister city relationship with the city of Chuncheon in South Korea.
