= Hotaka =

Hotaka may refer to:

== Japan ==
- Hotaka, Nagano
- Mount Hotaka (disambiguation)
  - Mount Hotaka (Gunma)
  - Mount Hotaka (Nagano, Gifu)

== People with the given name ==
- Hotaka Nakamura (born 1997), Japanese footballer (soccer)
- Hotaka Yamakawa (born 1991), Japanese professional baseball player

== See also ==
- Hotak (disambiguation)
- Hodaka (disambiguation)
