= Hotak (surname) =

Hotak is a Pashtun family name, and the name of the Hotak dynasty. People with the surname Hotak include:

- Abdul Aziz Hotak (died 1717), second ruler of the Hotak dynasty
- Amir Hamza Hotak (born 1991), Afghan cricketer
- Ashraf Hotak (died 1730), fourth ruler of the Hotak dynasty
- Ghulan Mohammed Hotak, Taliban fighter who defected to the Interim Afghan Government
- Hussain Hotak (died 1738), fifth and last ruler of the Hotak dynasty
- Mahmud Hotak (1697–1725), third ruler of the Hotak dynasty
- Mirwais Hotak (1673–1715), founder of the Hotak dynasty
- Musa Hotak, Afghan military leader and politician from Maidan Shar of Wardak Province
