= Hotak (disambiguation) =

The Hotak is a tribe of the Ghilji confederacy of the Pashtun people.

Hotak may also refer to:

- Hotak (surname)
- Hotak dynasty, an 18th-century Afghan monarchy

== See also ==
- Hotak v London Borough of Southwark
- Hotaka (disambiguation)
