= Mount Hotaka =

Mount Hotaka may refer to:

- Mount Hotaka (Gunma) (武尊山, Hotaka-yama), a stratovolcano in Gunma Prefecture, Japan
- Mount Hotaka (Nagano, Gifu) (穂高岳, Hotaka-dake), a mountain in Nagano and Gifu Prefectures, Japan
