= Johnen =

Johnen may refer to:

- 8581 Johnen, an asteroid in the Koronis family
- Wilhelm Johnen (1921–2002), German night fighter pilot

== See also ==
- Mount Jōnen, Nagano prefecture, Japan (namesake of the asteroid)
