= Mount Chō =

Mountain in Honshu, Japan

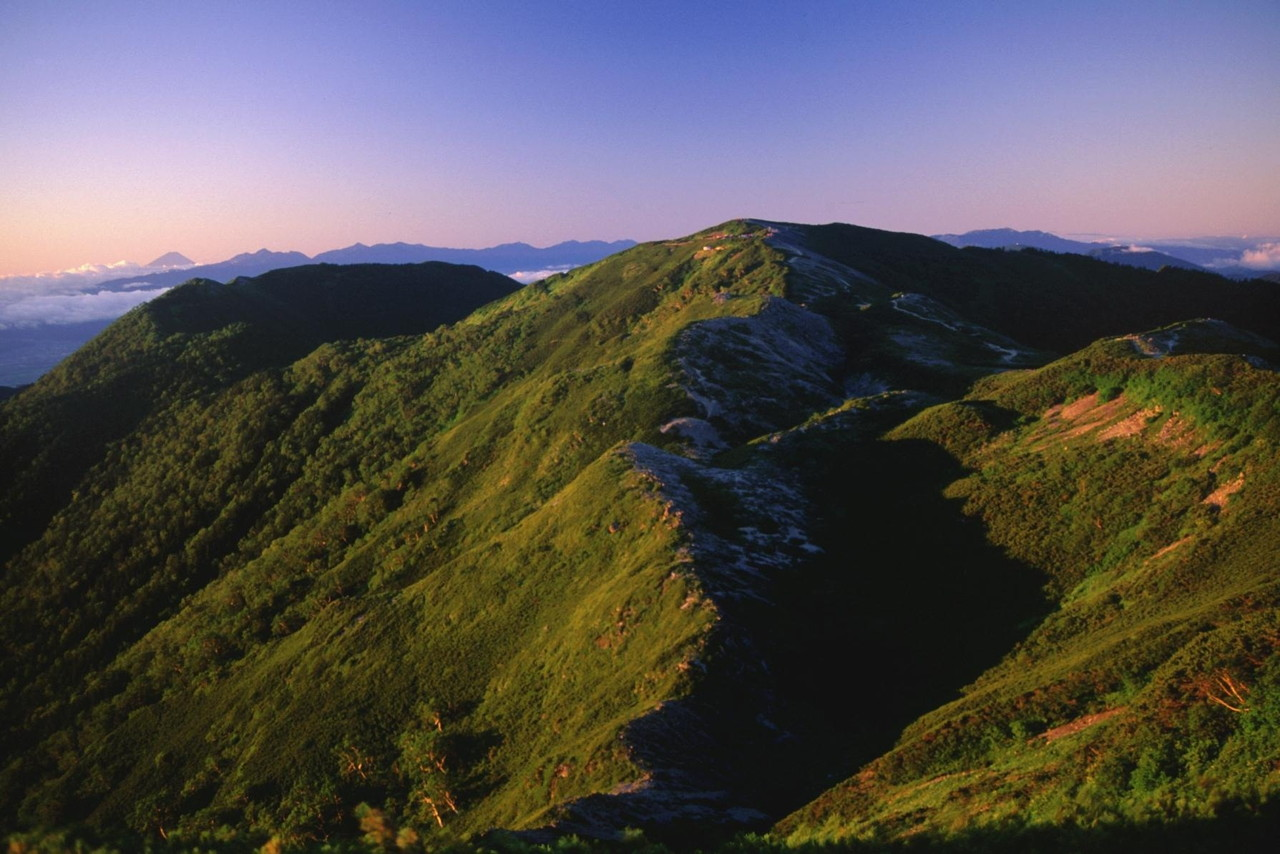
- Mount Chō from the direction of Choyari

Highest point
- Elevation: 2,677 m (8,783 ft)
- Prominence: 218 m
- Listing: 100 Famous Mountains of Nagano
- Coordinates: 36°17′15″N 137°43′34″E

Naming
- Native name: 蝶ヶ岳 (Japanese)
- Pronunciation: Japanese: [choːuːgaːtaːke]

Geography
- Location within Nagano Prefecture
- Location: Azumino, Nagano and Matsumoto, Nagano, Japan
- Parent range: Mount Chō in Hida Mountains

Climbing
- Easiest route: Hike

Mount Chō (蝶ヶ岳, Chougatake) at 2,677 m (8,783 ft) is a mountain located in Japan. Mount Chō is part of the Hida Mountains (Northern Alps) in Chūbu-Sangaku National Park, and is located in the cities of Azumino and Matsumoto in Nagano Prefecture. It is located to the south of Mount Jōnen on the ridgeline of the Jōnen Mountain Range. Mount Chō is a popular destination for hikers because it offers views of other famous Japanese mountains, including Mount Yari and Mount Hotakadake along the Panorama Ginza.

The summit of Mount Chō has a gentle slope, and near the summit, several small ponds are found, including Chougaike (蝶ヶ池) at 2,655 m (8,711 ft) and Youseinoike (妖精ノ池) at 2,605 m (8,547 ft). Viewed from Mount Chōyari, the double-ridgeline of Mount Chō can be seen. Much snow accumulates here, affecting the distribution of alpine plants. Near the summit is a zone of creeping pines, and it is a habitat for rock ptarmigan.

== Climbing ==
=== History ===
- In 1826 (Bunsei 9), the Jōdo-shū Buddhist monk, Banryū (播隆), is said to have made the first recorded ascent. Banryū is known as the "unknown first alpinist".
- In 1932 (Showa 7), the Japanese mountaineer and photographer, Kanmuri Matsujiro, photographed Yarigatake viewed from the summit of Chogatake for his Kurobe Gorge photography series.
- In 1958, the Chougatake Hut was opened by Nakamura Yoshichika.
- In 1969, the Mitsumata Trail, built by Nakamura Yoshichika and others, was opened.

=== Climbing Routes ===
There are several climbing routes, including direct ascents from the east and west, as well as ridgeline routes from the north and south. In addition, there is lodge, Chougatake Hyutte (Chougatake Hut), just below the summit with a small tent site.

The route from Mitsumata Trailhead (三股登山口 Mitsumata tozan guchi), 1,350 m (4,430 ft) is one of the most popular routes, and takes approximately 5 hours, and climbs 1300m over 6.5 km. The start of this route also branches to Mount Jōnen. Mitsumata Trailhead is accessed by taxi, approximately 30 minutes, from Hotaka Station on the Ōito Line in Azumino.

Another popular route starts in the remote mountainous highland valley of Kamikōchi. From the Kamikōchi Bus Terminal, it is an approximate 2-hour leisurely flat walk beside the Azusa River to the Tokusawa (徳沢) area, 1,562 m (5,125 ft). From there, the trail rises steeply along the Nagakabe Ridge to 2,565 m (8,415 ft), and then to the summit of Mount Chō. In all, this trail takes approximately 6–7 hours from the Kamikōchi Bus Terminal . Additionally, it is possible to continue beside the Azusa River for another hour to Yokoo (横尾), 1,629 m (5,344 ft), and climb from there for approximately 4 hours. Yokoo is also the junction for hiking routes to Mount Yari and Karasawa Cirque.

A third route is an up-down 4-km ridgeline traverse to or from the summit of Mount Jōnen. This route takes 4–6 hours, depending on speed and skill, and passes over Mount Choyari, 2,655 m (8,711 ft). A popular extended hike starts at the Mitsumata Trailhead, climbs Mount Chō, traverses to Mount Jōnen, and then descends Mount Maejōnen, 2,662 m (8,734 ft), to finish at the Mitsumata Trailhead. This route takes over 15 hours.

Mountains	Name	Elevation （m）	Triangulation station Class	from Mount Chō Distance（km）	Remarks
	Mount Yari	3,180		9.3	100 Famous Japanese Mountains, 5th highest mountain in Japan
	Mount Otenshō	2,921.91	Class 3	8.9	The highest peak of the Jōnen Mountains, Two Hundred Famous Mountains of Japan
	Mount Jōnen	2,857	Class 1 (Maejōnendake)	4.2	100 Famous Japanese Mountains, Jōnen Goya Lodge (accommodates 300)
	Mount Choyari	2,655		1.5	small rocky peak
	Mount Chō	2,677	Class 3	0	Chougatake Hut (accommodates 300)
	Mount Otaki	2,616	Class 3	2.2	Otaki Hut (accommodates 50)
	Mount Nabekanmuri	2,194	Class 3	5.3	Nabekan Forest Road
	Mount Hotakadake	3,190		7.0	3rd highest peak of the Hida Mountains, 100 Famous Japanese Mountains

== Gallery ==
Mount Chō
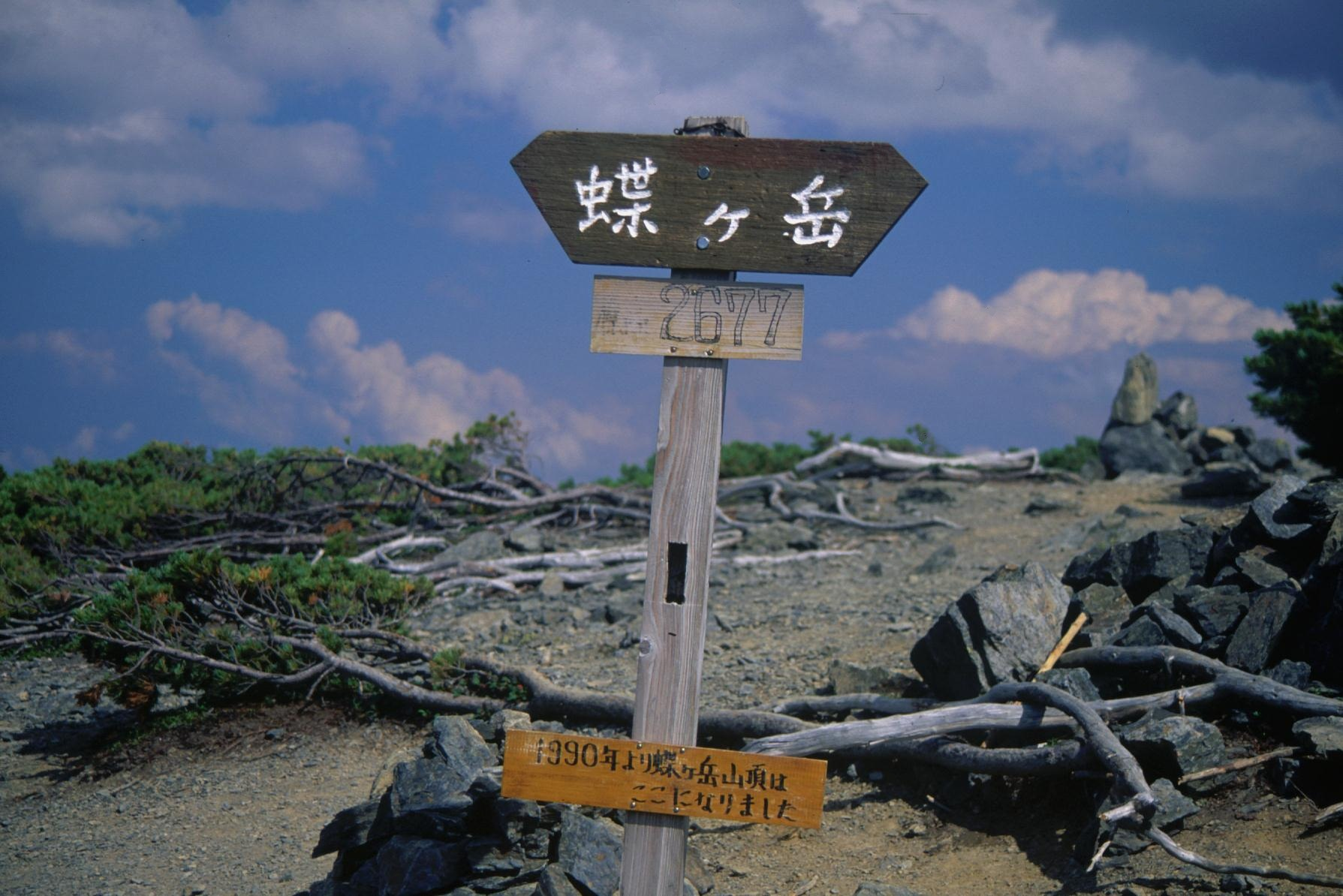
Mt. Chō summit signpost

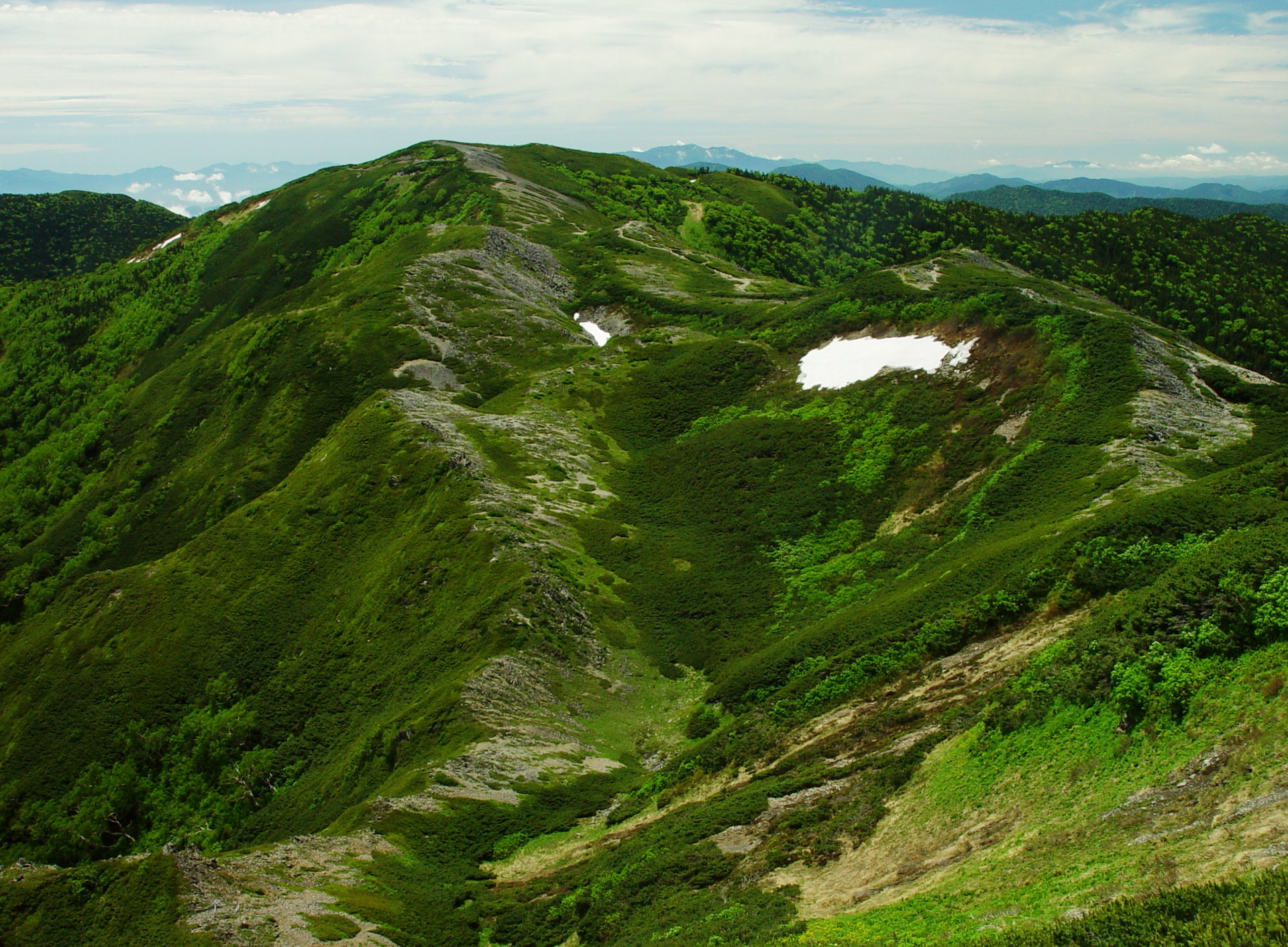
the double ridgeline viewed from the north

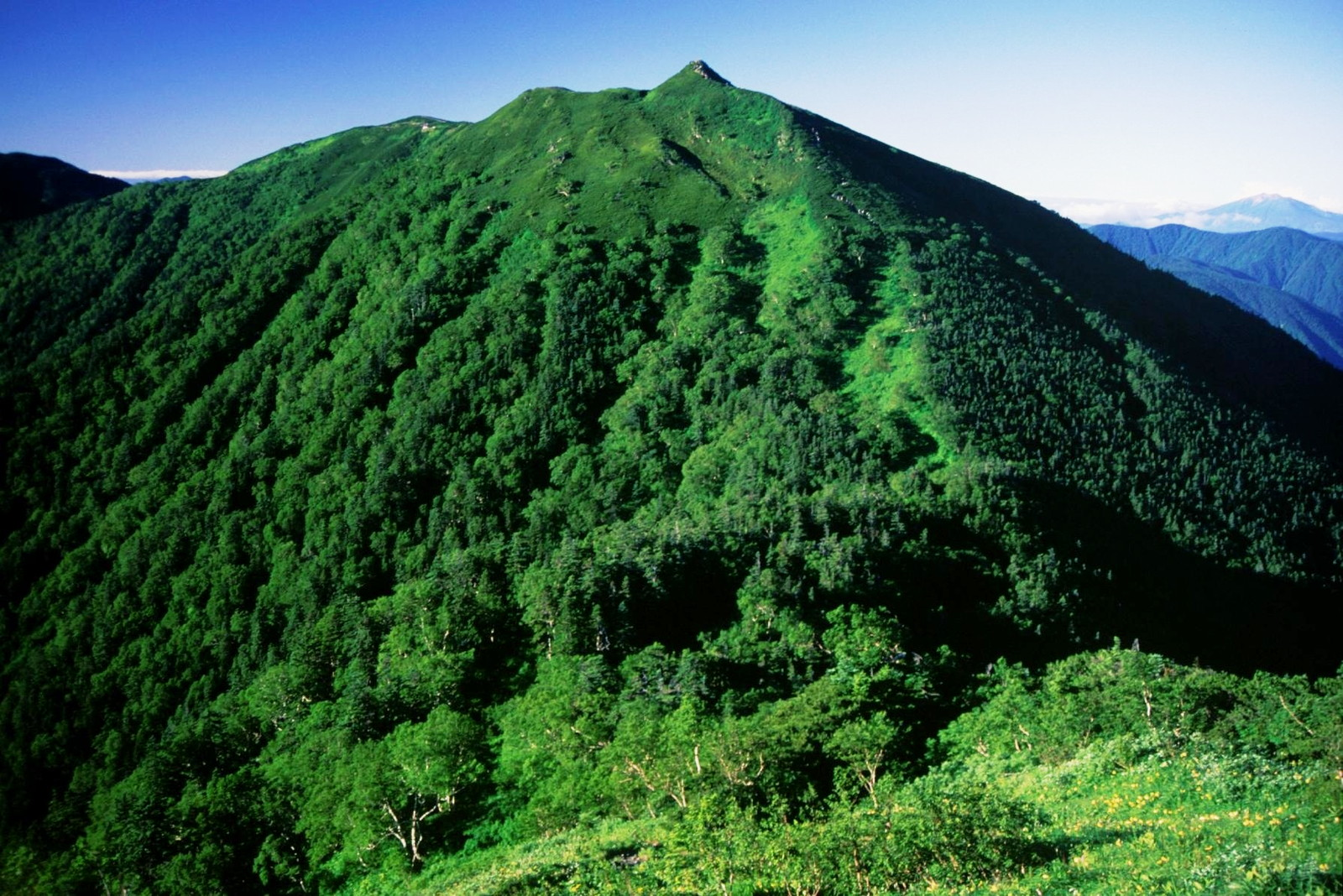
Choyari

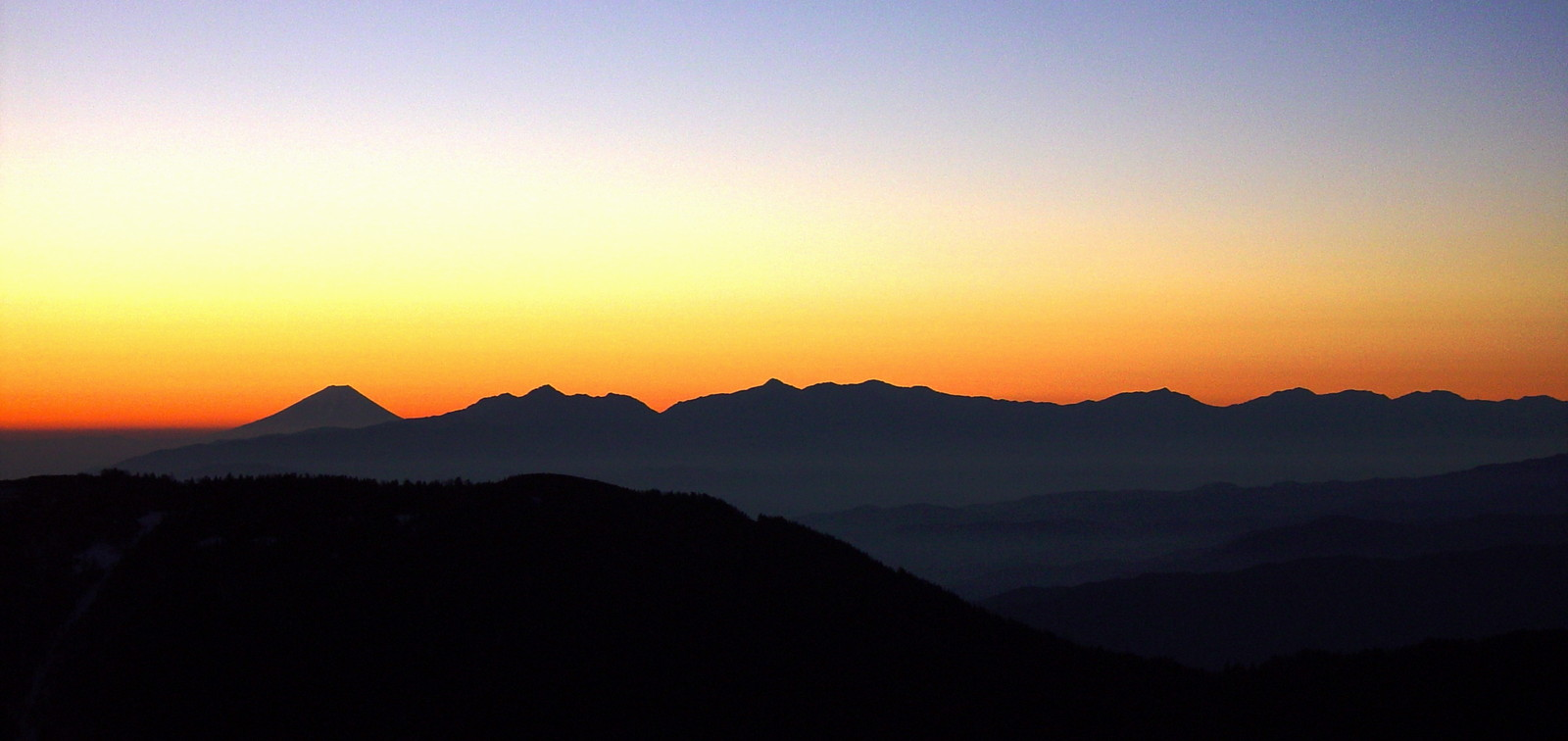
Mount Fuji and Southern Japanese Alps from Mt. Chō

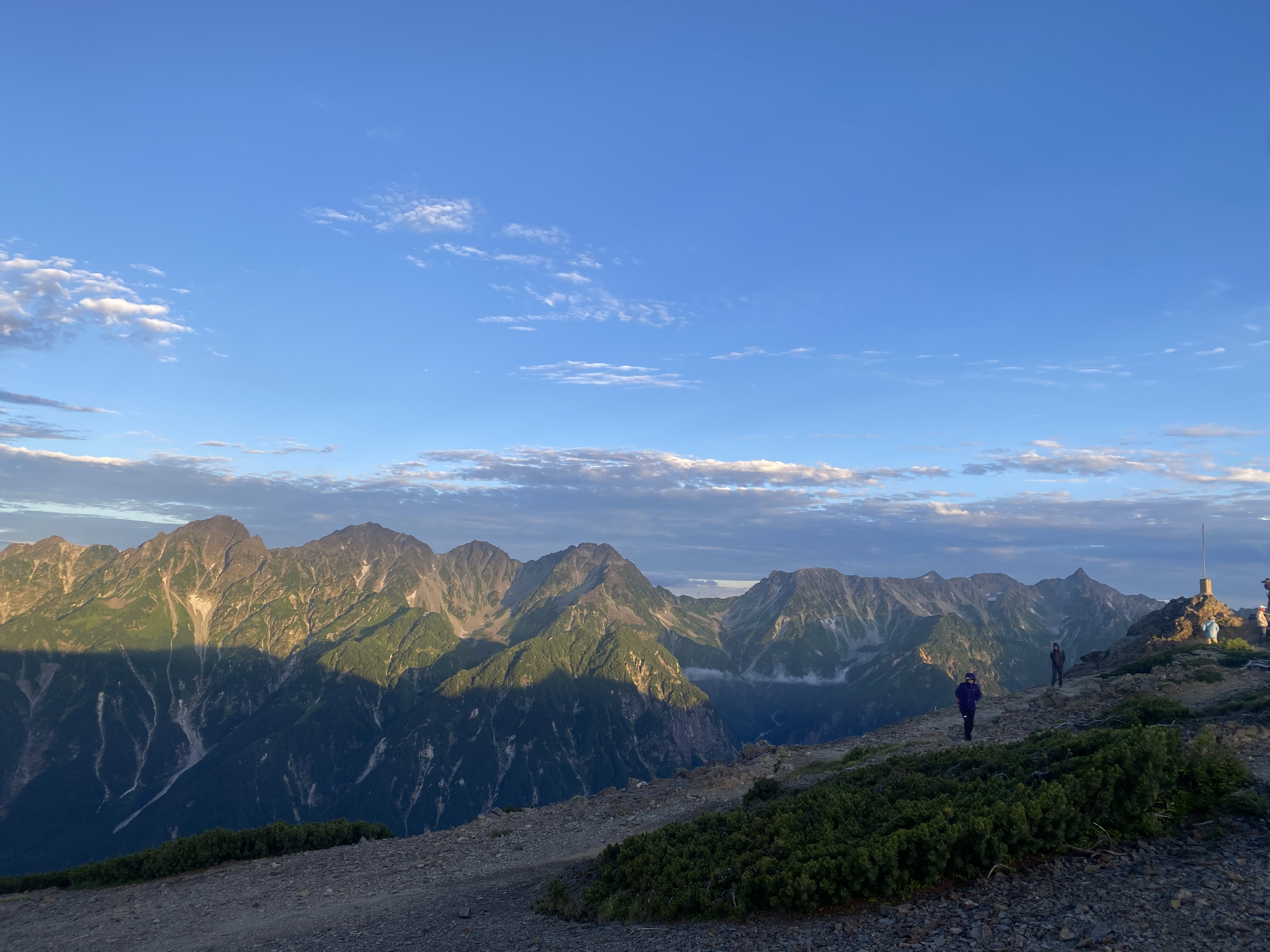
Mount Hotakadake and Mount Yari from Mount Chō

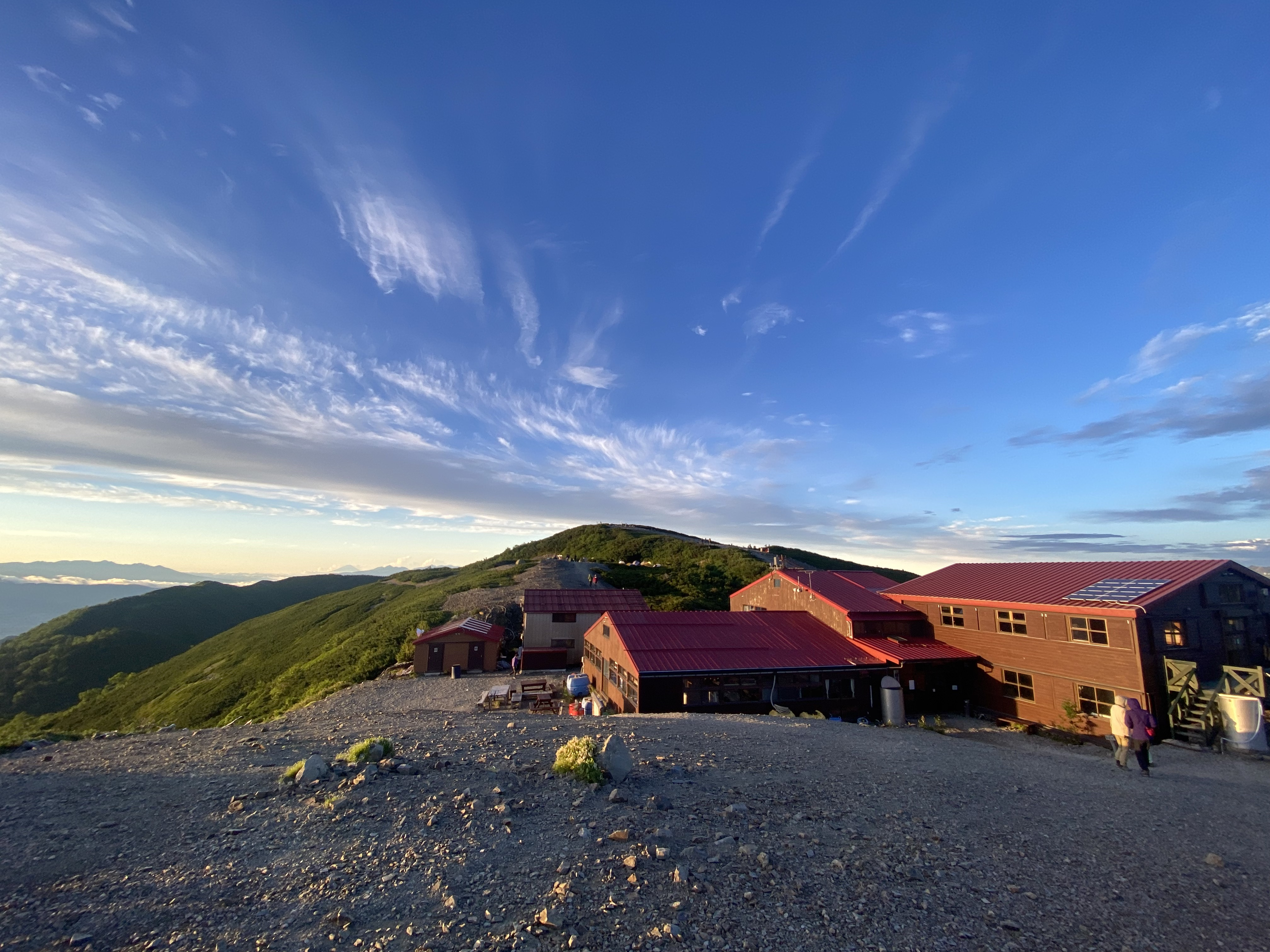
Looking south towards Chougatake Hyutte and the summit of Mount Chō

== See also ==
- Chūbu-Sangaku National Park
- Hida Mountains
- Kamikōchi
- Nagano Prefecture
