= Karasawa Cirque =

Galacial Cirques in japan

Coordinates: 36.2933991°N 137.6588256°E

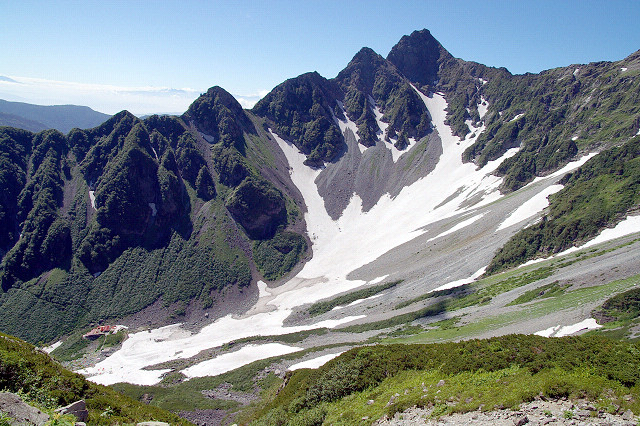
Karasawa Cirque

Karasawa Cirque (涸沢カール, Karasawa ka-ru) is one of major glacial cirques in Japan, located in the Kamikochi region of Azumi, Matsumoto City, in Nagano prefecture. The entire cirque and surrounding mountains are all within Chūbu-Sangaku National Park, which was designated a national park on December 4, 1934.

== Outline ==
Karasawa Cirque lies under the peaks of Mount Hotakadake, including its highest Mount Okuhatakadake (3,190m), in the Hida Mountains or Northern Japanese Alps. Other peaks circling the glacial valley include Mount Karasawa (3,110m), Mount Kitahotakadake, and (3,106m) Maehotakadake (3,090m). Other important locations include: Shirade Col (白出のコル) where Hotakadake mountain cottage (穂高岳山荘, Hotakadake sansou), built in 1924, is located at 2983m; and a ridge, Seitengrat (ザイテングラート) which leads to Mount Okuhatakadake.

The diameter of the cirque is about 2,000m. The floor of the cirque is 2,300m above sea level, with a difference in elevation of 900m. Melting snow from the cirque helps to form the Azusa River, which flows down through the Kamikochi valley, before joining the Sai River and then the Shinano River, Japan's longest.

The area of Karasawa, Matsumoto has been designated as a difficult-to-access area (交通困難地, Kōtsū kon'nan-chi) by Japan Post, so it is not possible to send mail to this area from outside.

== Hiking and mountaineering ==
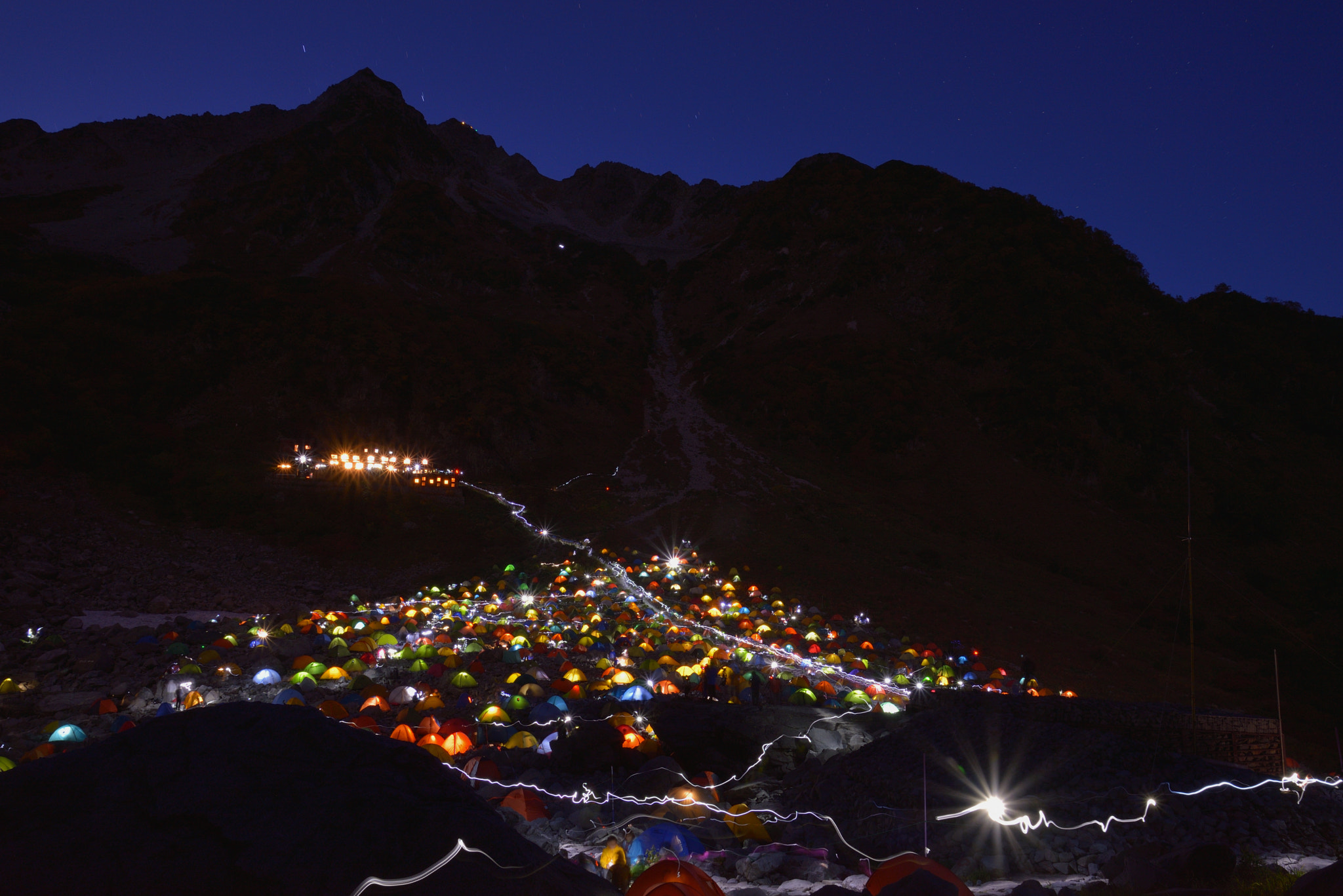
Night view of the tents at the cirque below the peak of Mount Kitahotaka

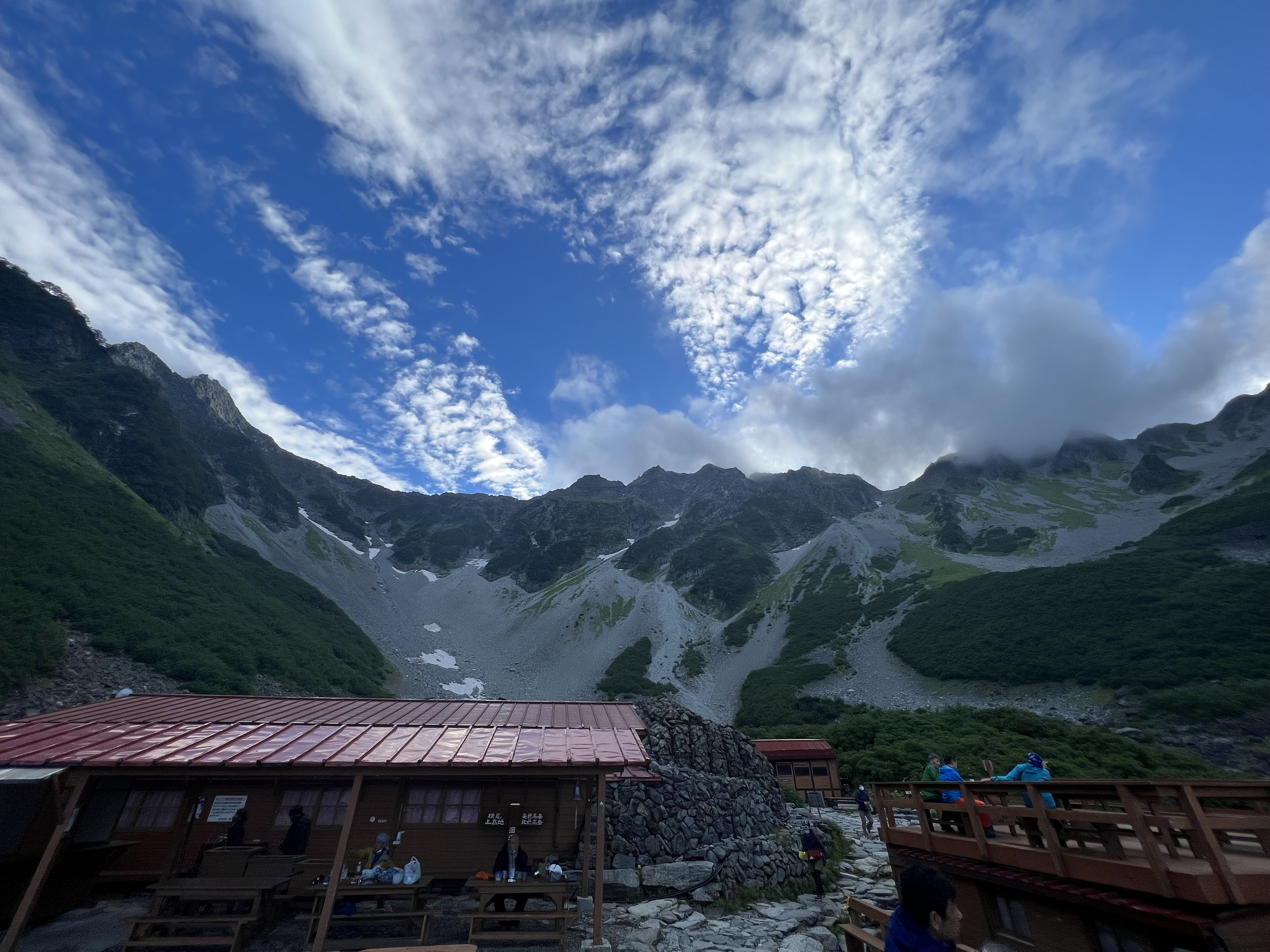
View of Mount Okuhotaka above Karasawa Hütte at Karasawa Cirque

Karasawa Cirque is the center for mountaineering Mount Hotakadake, and is filled with tents in summer. Climbers might also choose to stay at Karasawa Hütte (涸沢ヒュッテ, Karasawa hyutte) or Karasawa Hut (涸沢小屋テ, Karasawa goya). Some snow remains in summer. The cirque is also famous for the vivid colors of its autumn leaves, and is the "best autumn hike in Kamikochi".

A popular, 2-day, 30 km round trip hiking route, with an 800m elevation gain, to the cirque begins at the Kamikochi Bus Terminal (1,504m), taking hikers and climbers past Myojinkan (明神館, Myoujinkan) (approximately + 1 hour) (1,504m), Tokusawa-en (徳沢園, Tokusawa-en) + 1 hour) (1,562m), Yokoo (横尾, Yokoo) (+ 1 hour) (1,620m), Hontani Bridge (本谷橋, Hontanibashi) (+ 1 hour) (1,780m), Karasawa Hütte (+ 2 hours) (2,300m). The hike is relatively flat until Yokoo, then rises somewhat to Hontani bridge, and from there the elevation rises steeply to 2300m over a distance of 2 km.

It is also possible to hike down to Yokoo from Mount Yari (3,180) or Mount Chō (2,677m) and continue to Hontani Bridge and beyond. The most experienced climbers could traverse into the cirque, for example from Mount Yari, to Mount Nakadake, to Mount Minamidake, then along the Daikiretto gap (大キレット, Daikiretto) to Mount Kitahotakadake. Note that the Daikiretto gap route between Mount Yari and Mount Kitahotakadake is rated the most technically and physically challenging trail in Nagano.

== Karasawa Glacier ==
Geographer Tomoya Iozawa advocated two stages of glaciers in Japan through reading aerial photographs of Japanese Alps. The first of these is Yokoo Glacier (60 thousand years ago) and the other is Karasawa Glacier (20 thousand years ago).

== Mountain huts ==
There are two major mountain huts in the cirque, Karasawa Hutte and Hut of Karasawa, and others near the surrounding peaks and rivers.
