= Musa Hotak =

Afghan politician

Musa Hotak is an Afghan military leader and politician from Maidan Shar of Wardak Province. He and his brother Ghulan Mohammed Hotak played prominent roles in the resistance to the Soviet occupation. They were not original members of the Taliban, but joined it when it was gaining power during the civil war that followed the overthrow of the communist regime.

Musa Hotak is reported to have been the Taliban deputy planning minister.

On June 14, 2004 Islam Online described Musa Hotak as one of the weaker warlords, with only 100 fighters. Its report attributes Hotak's recent surrender of his weapons, and the demobilization of his fighters, because he: "...had little choice, since the forces under his command were not very powerful and because Wardak’s proximity to Kabul places it both under the spotlight and within the reach of government security forces."

Musa Hotak was a member of the Afghan Constitutional Loya Jirga in 2003, He ran for office in the Loya Jirga in 2005, once the Constitution had been ratified.
