= Mount Jōnen =

Mountain in Japan

- 常念岳
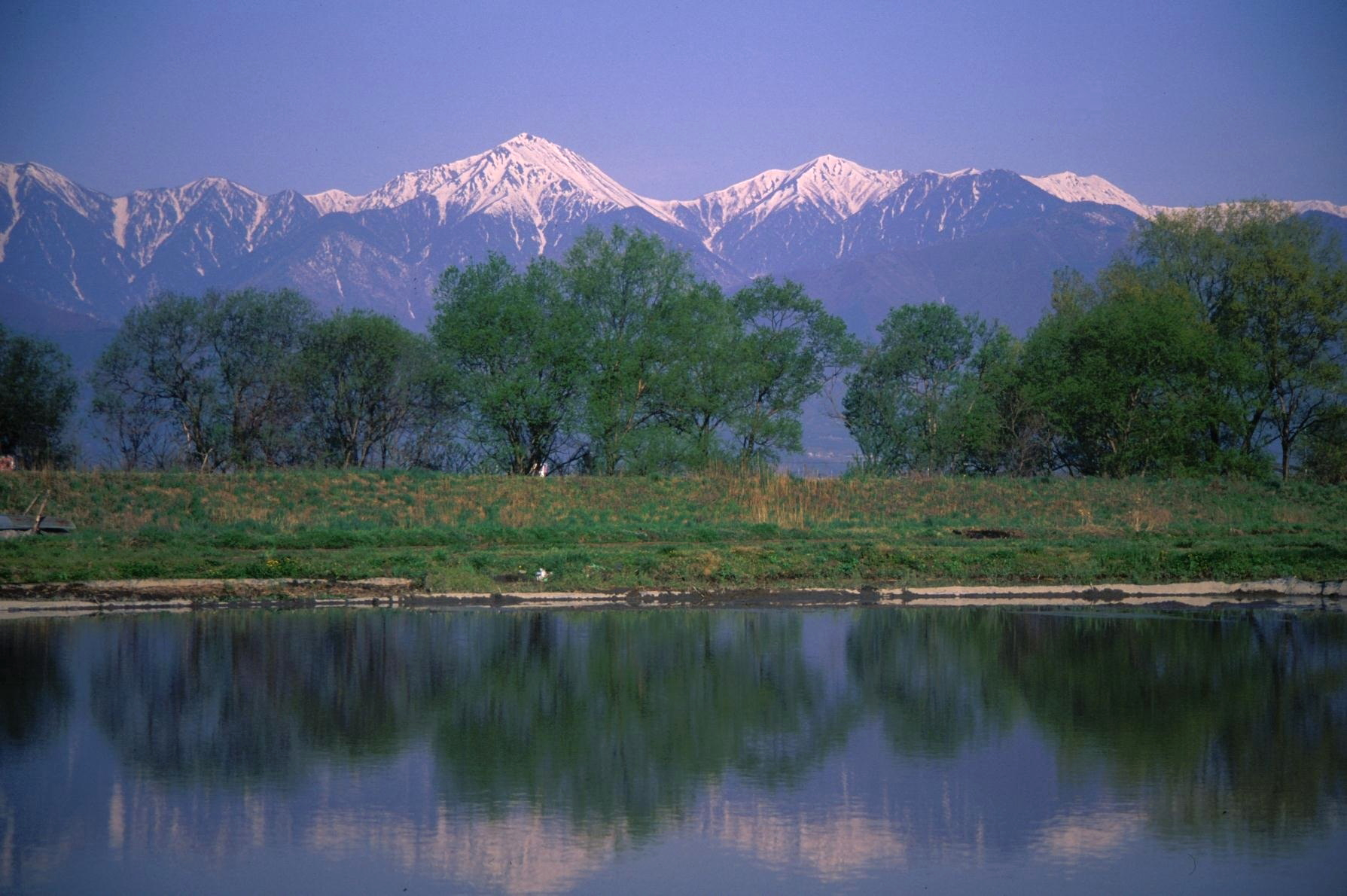
- Mount Jōnen, Mount Yokotooshi and Azusa River in spring from Azumi Basin

Highest point
- Elevation: 2,857 m (9,373 ft)
- Listing: 100 Famous Japanese Mountains; List of mountains in Japan
- Coordinates: 36°19′32″N 137°43′39″E

Naming
- Language of name: Japanese

Geography
- Location within Japan
- Location: Azumino, Nagano and Matsumoto, Nagano, Japan
- Parent range: Jōnen Mountains in Hida Mountains
- Topo map(s): Geospatial Information Authority 25000:1 穂高岳; 50,000:1 上高地

Climbing
- First ascent: Walter Weston in 1894 (Mountaineering)

Mount Jōnen (常念岳, Jōnen-dake) is one of the 100 Famous Japanese Mountains, reaching the height of 2,857 m (9,373 ft). It is situated in Japan's Hida Mountains in Nagano Prefecture and in Chūbu-Sangaku National Park. The shape of the mountain looks like the triangle. It can be seen from Azumi Basin.

== Outline ==
This mountain is formed with Granite. Before 1959 nine kinds of butterfly on high mountains can be seen around the mountain. Colias erate and others can be seen now. The shape of the remaining snow of this mountain had decided the time when it farmed. The shape was called Jōnen-Bō (常念坊, Jōnen-Bō).

== History ==
- Summer 1894: Englishman Walter Weston was the first non-Japanese to reach the summit.
- Summer 1906: Usui Kojima summited.
- July 27, 1919: Mountain hut of Jōnen Hut (常念小屋, Jōnen-goya) was opened.
- 1922: Kyūya Fukada stayed at the Jōnen Hut, and climbed this mountain.
- June 1931: The double accident of the climbing mountain party and the rescue team occurred.
- December 4, 1934: This area was specified to the Chūbu-Sangaku National Park.
- 1993: Postage stamp of Jōnen Kasa with Matsumoto Castle was put on the market by the Ministry of Posts and Telecommunications (Japan).
- May 28, 2007: NHK broadcasts the television program concerning Mount Jōnen in the series programs of excellent mountain in Japan.
- September 10, 2010: NHK broadcasts the television program concerning Mount Jōnen and the high mountain butterfly.

== Mountaineering ==
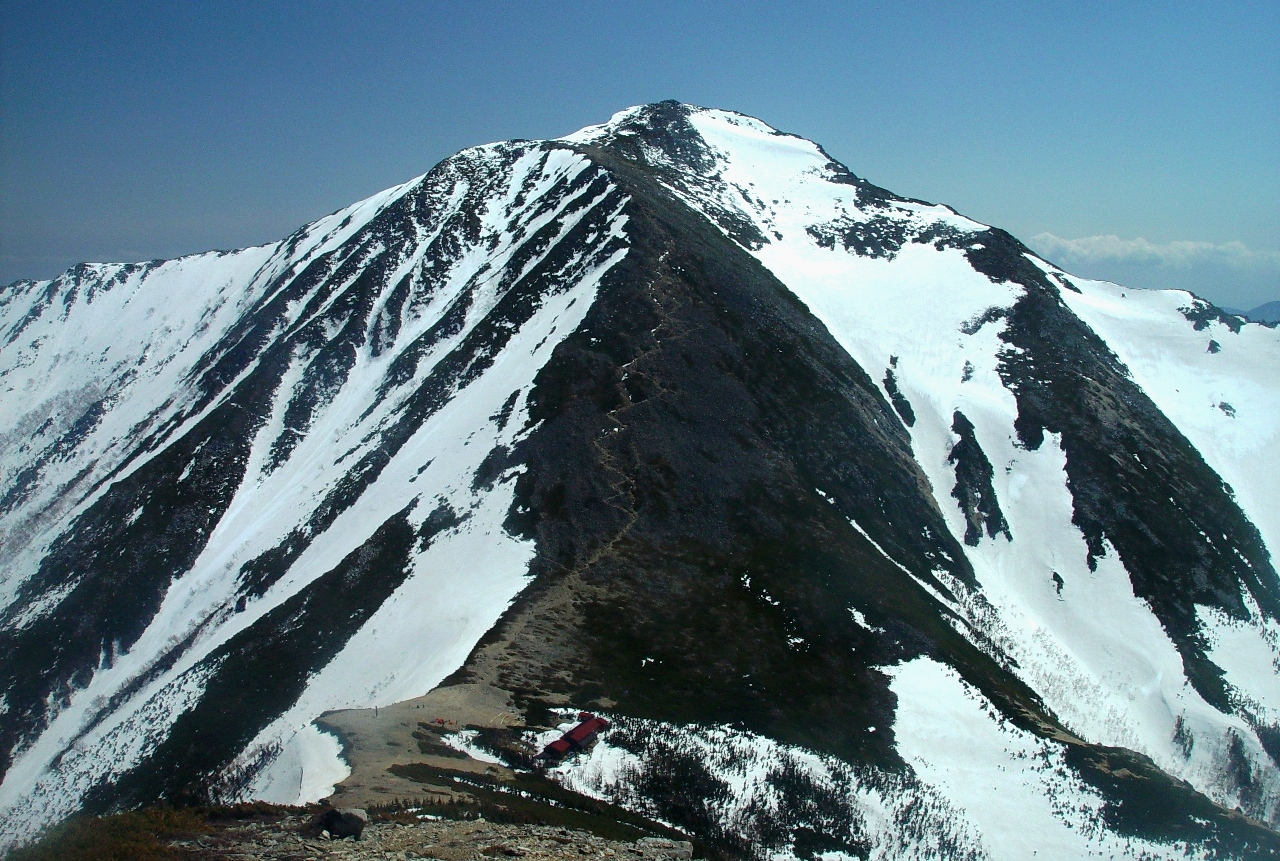
Mount Jōnen, Jōnen Hut and the climbing trail from Mount Yokotooshi

=== Main ascent routes ===
There are three climbing routes to the top of the mountain.

Ichino River route
Hie-Daira - Ichino River (一ノ沢, Ichi-no-sawa) - Munatuki-hachō - Jōnen Hut(Jōnen-Nokkoshi) - Mount Jōnen
Mount Mae-Jōnen (前常念岳, Mae-Jōnen-dake) route
Mitsumata(三股) - Hon river - Mount Mae-Jōnen - Mount Jōnen
Traverses Route of Jōnen Mountains (from north and south)
There are several stating points to climb.(Kamikōchi, Tokusawa, Yokoo, Mitsumata, from Mount Otensuo, and others)

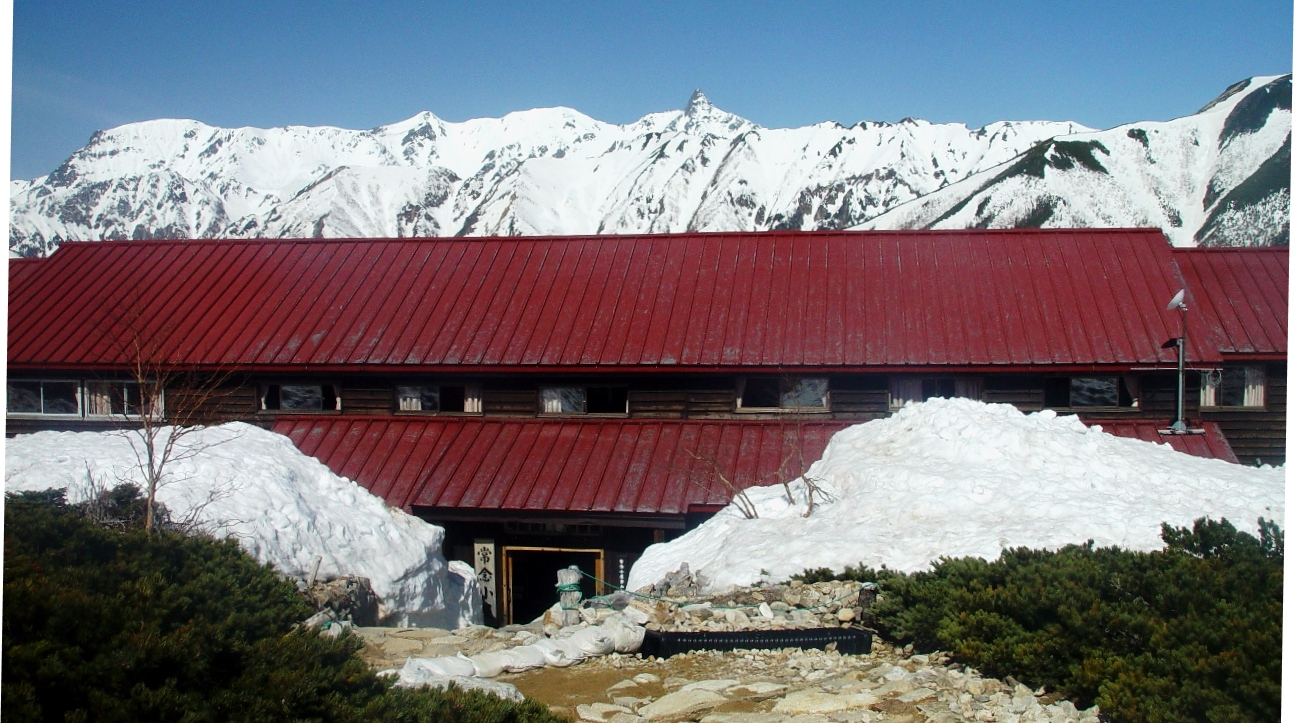
Jōnen Hut and Mount Yari in spring

=== Mountain hut ===
Thera are several Mountain hut around Mount Jōnen. There is the Campsite on each hut.

- Jōnen Hut (常念小屋) - On the pass of Jōnen Pass (常念乗越, Jōnen-Nokkoshi) between Mount Jōnen and Mount Yokotooshi. It is one of the oldest hut in Japan.
- Mount Chō Hut (蝶ヶ岳ヒュッテ) - Near the top of Mount Chō.
- Yokoo Mountain Cottage (横尾山荘) - In Yokoo most in the north of Kamikochi.
- Daiten Cottage (大天荘) - Near the top of Mount Otensyo.

== Geography ==
=== Nearby Mountains ===
It is on the sub ridge line of Jōnen Mountains in the southeast part of the Hida Mountains. There is a small peak of Mount Mae-Jōnen in the southeast by east.

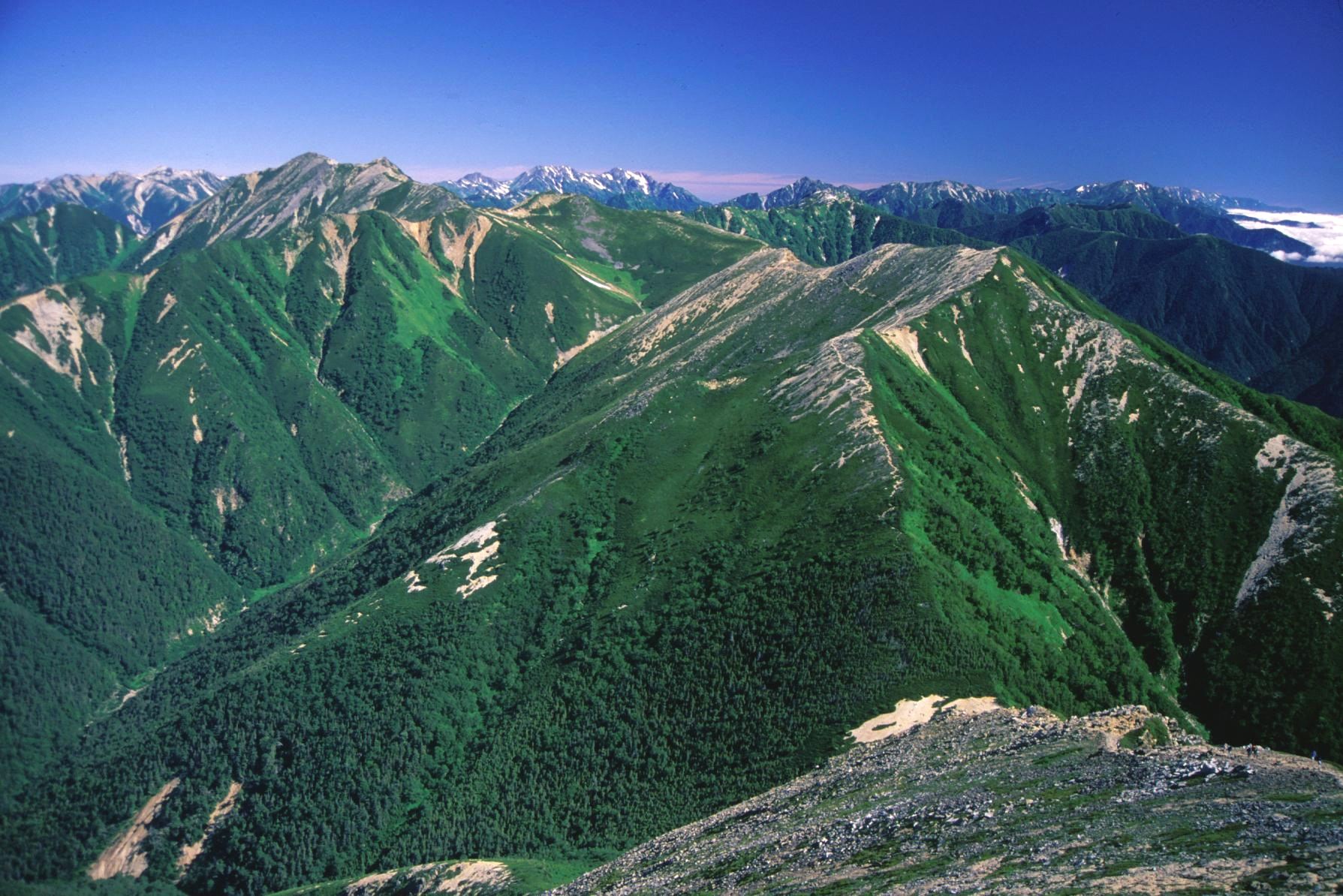
Mount Yokotooshi and Mount Otensyo from Mount Jōnen

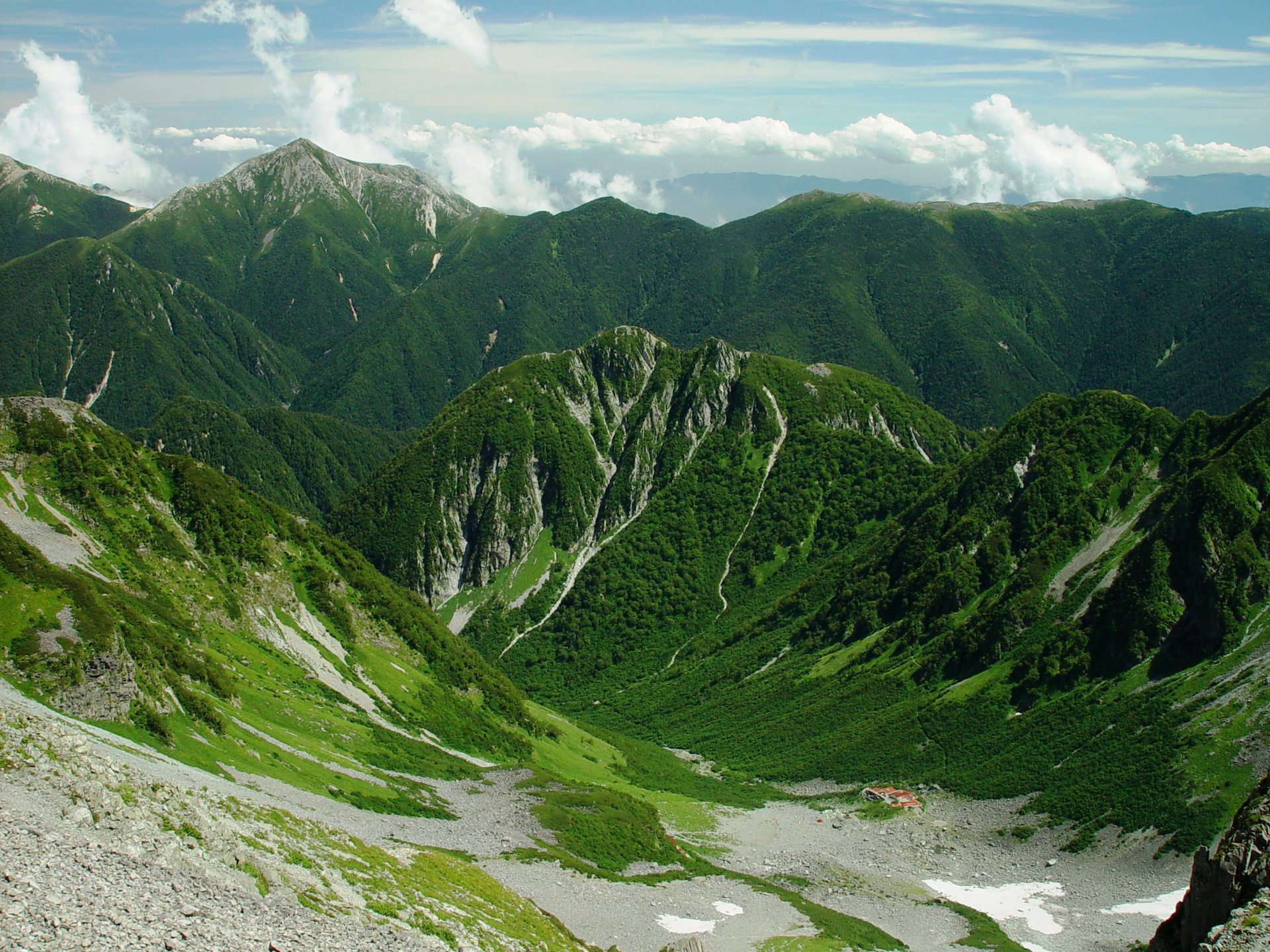
Mount Jōnen and Karasawa from Mount Hotaka

Image	Mountain	Elevation	Distance from the Top	Note
	Mt. Yari 槍ヶ岳	3,180 m (10,433 ft)	7.4 km (4.6 mi)	100 Famous
	Mt. Otensyo 大天井岳	2,921.91 m (9,586 ft)	5.0 km (3.1 mi)	tallest mountain in Jōnen Mountains; 200 Famous
	Mt. Yokotooshi 横通岳	2,766.99 m (9,078 ft)	1.9 km (1 mi)	
	Mt. Jōnen 常念岳	2,857 m (9,373 ft)	0 km (0.0 mi)	100 Famous
	Mt. Mae-Jōnen 前常念岳	2,661.78 m (8,733 ft)	2.0 km (1.2 mi)	
	Mt. Chō 蝶ヶ岳	2,677 m (8,783 ft)	4.2 km (2.6 mi)	100 Famous
	Mt. Hotaka 穂高岳	3,190 m (10,466 ft)	8.2 km (5.1 mi)	tallest mountain in Hida Mountains; 100 Famous

=== Source river ===
Each source river joins the main stream of Shinano River, then flows to the Sea of Japan.

- Ichinomata Valley (Tributary of Azusa River)
- Jōnen River, Ichino River and Nino river (tributary of Sai (Nagano) River)

== Gallery ==
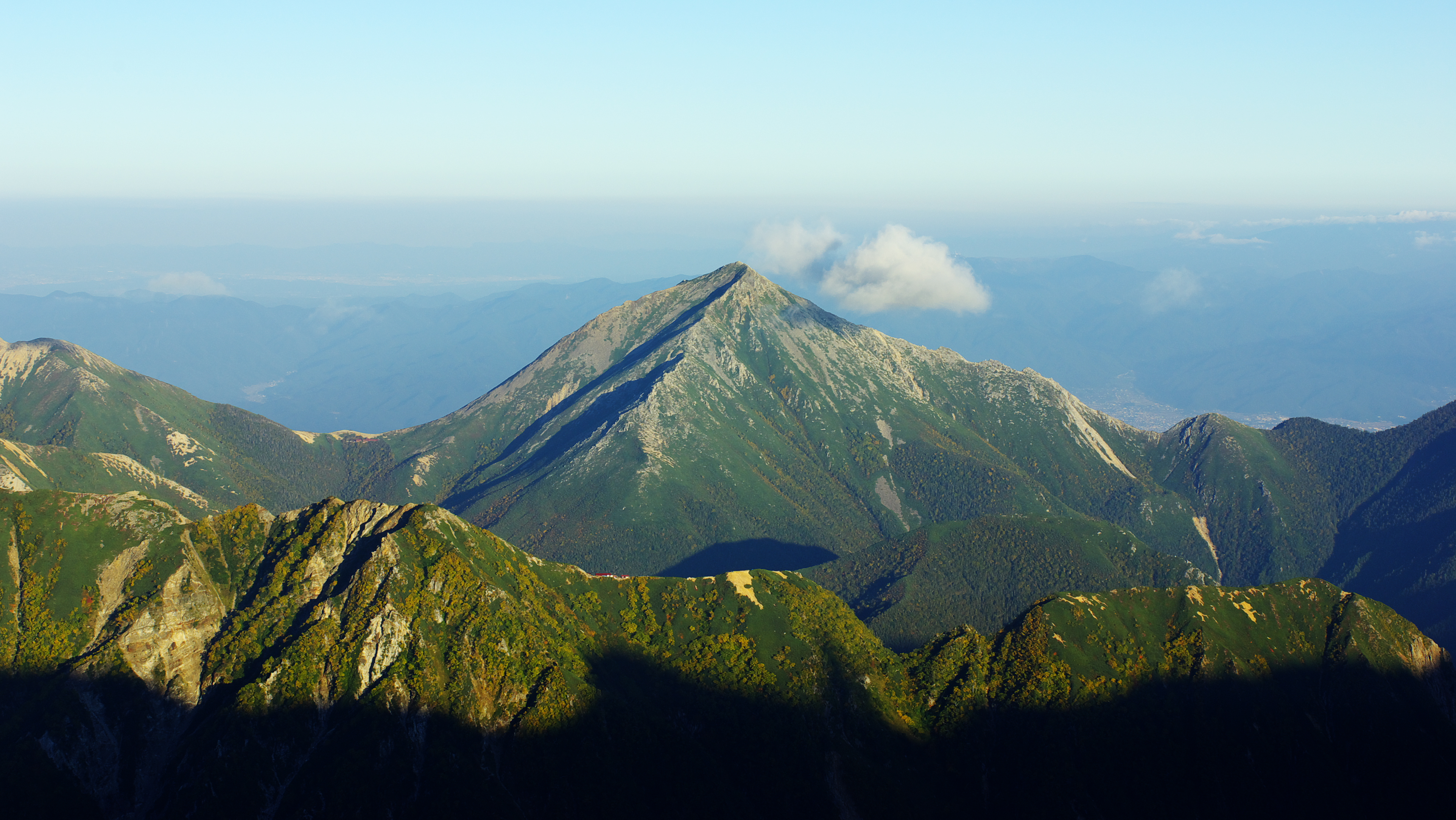
Mount Jōnen from Mount Yari

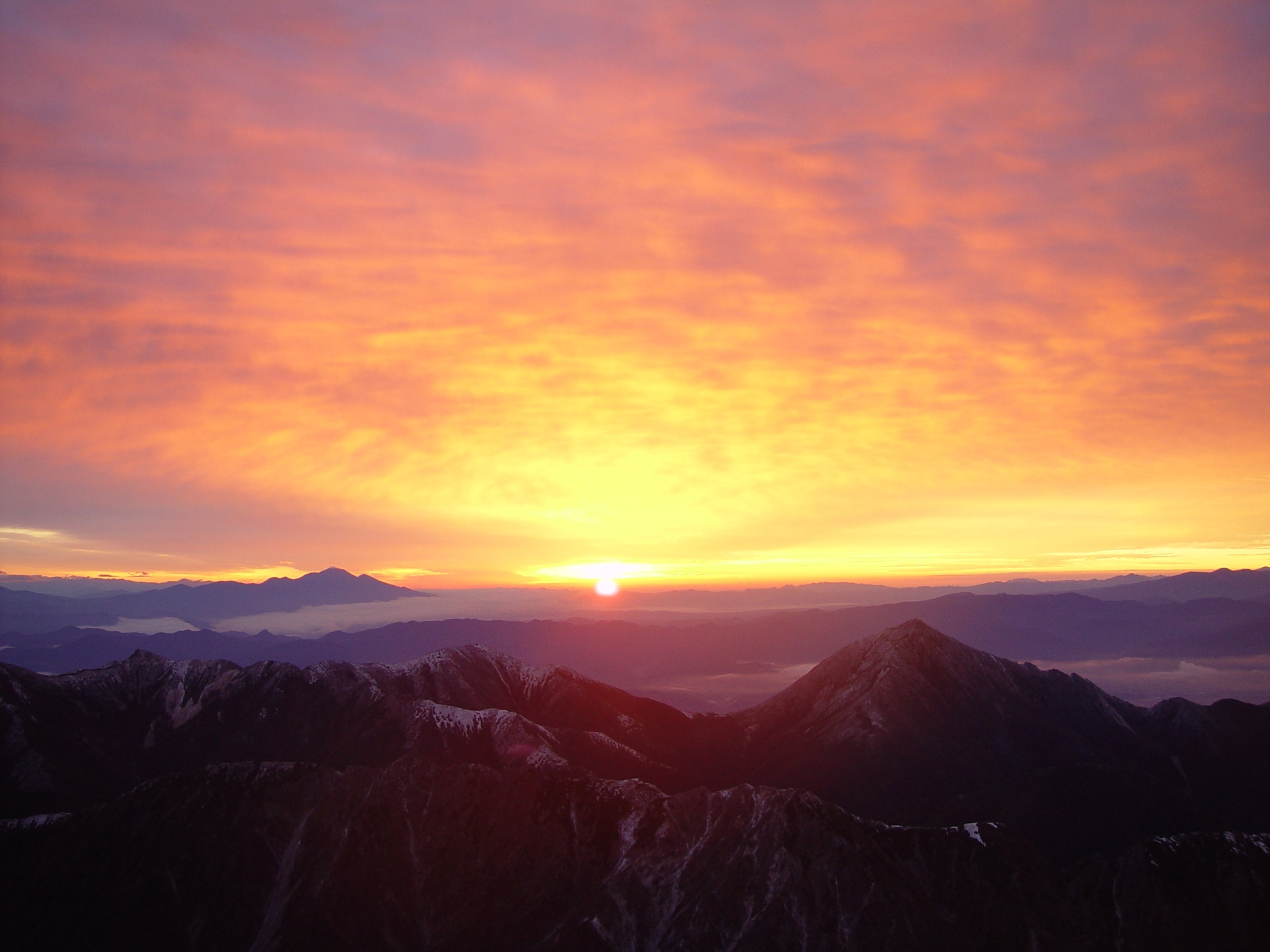
Mount Jōnen and sunrise from Mount Yari

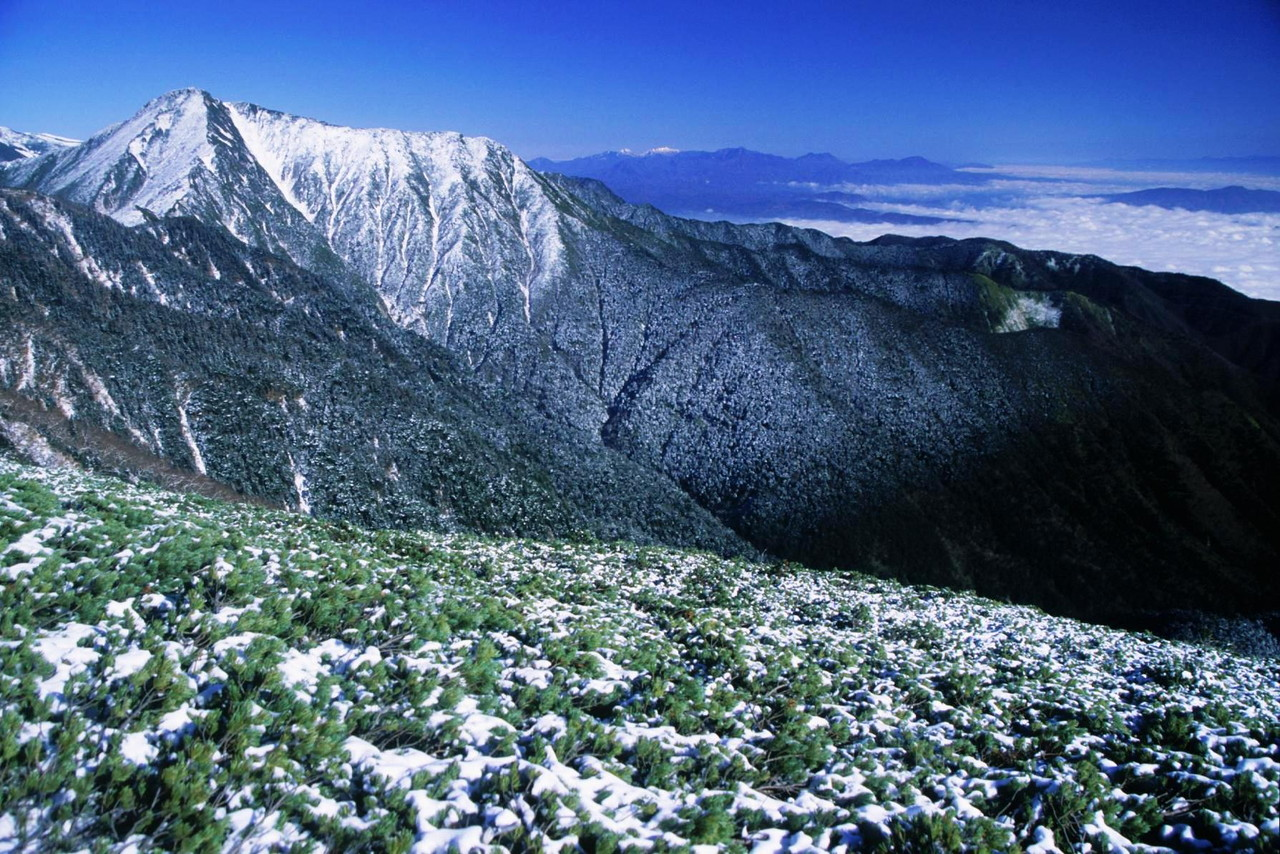
Mount Jōnen where it snowed from Mount Chō

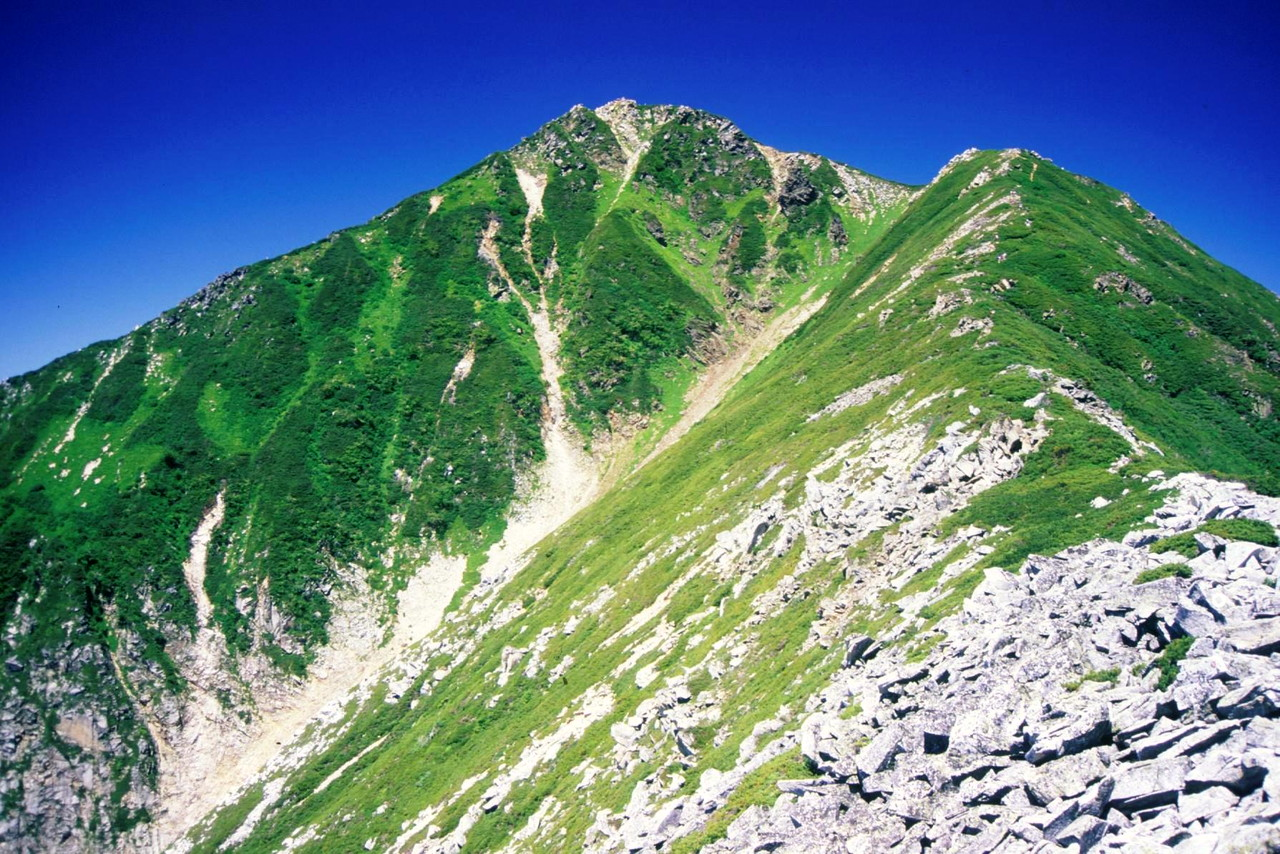
Mount Jōnen in summer from Mount Mae-Jōnen

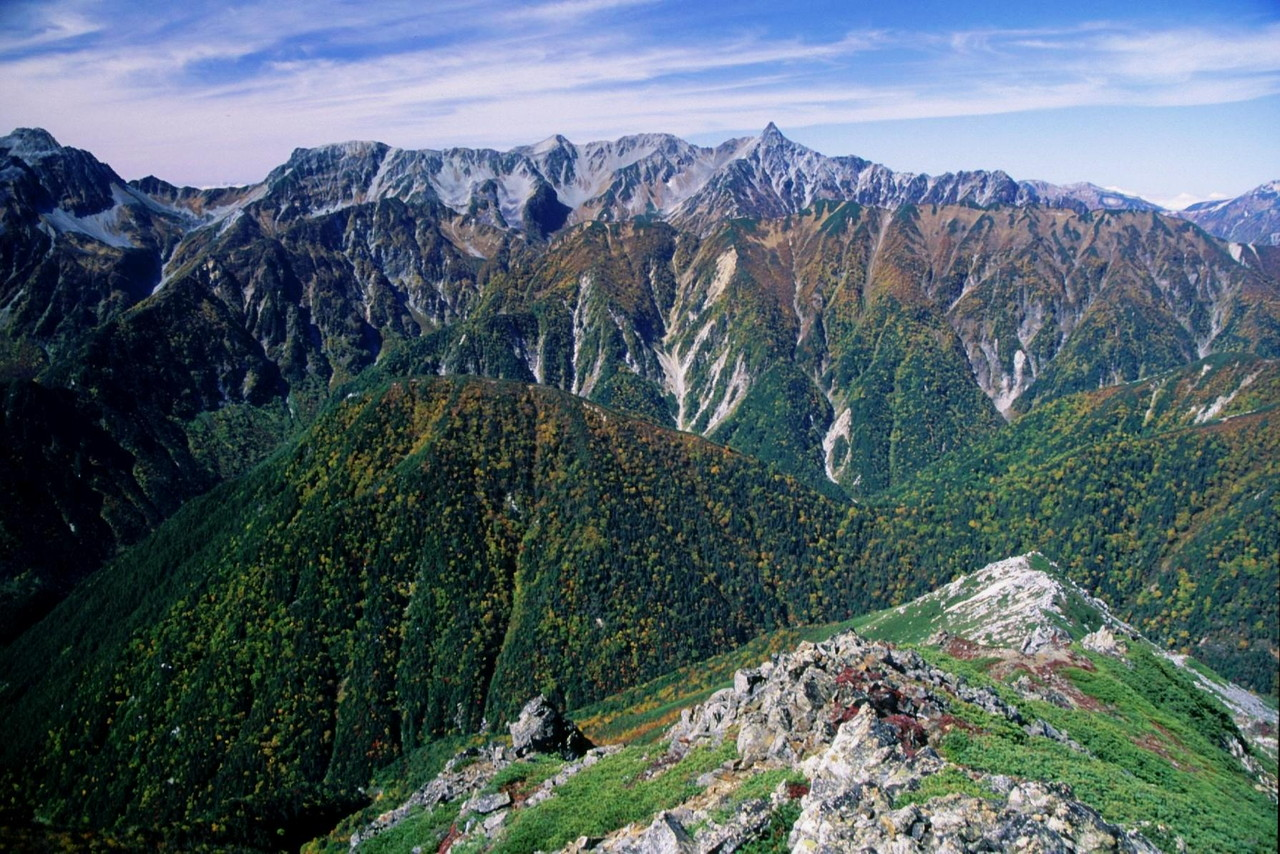
Mount Yari that turned red in autumn from Mount Jōnen

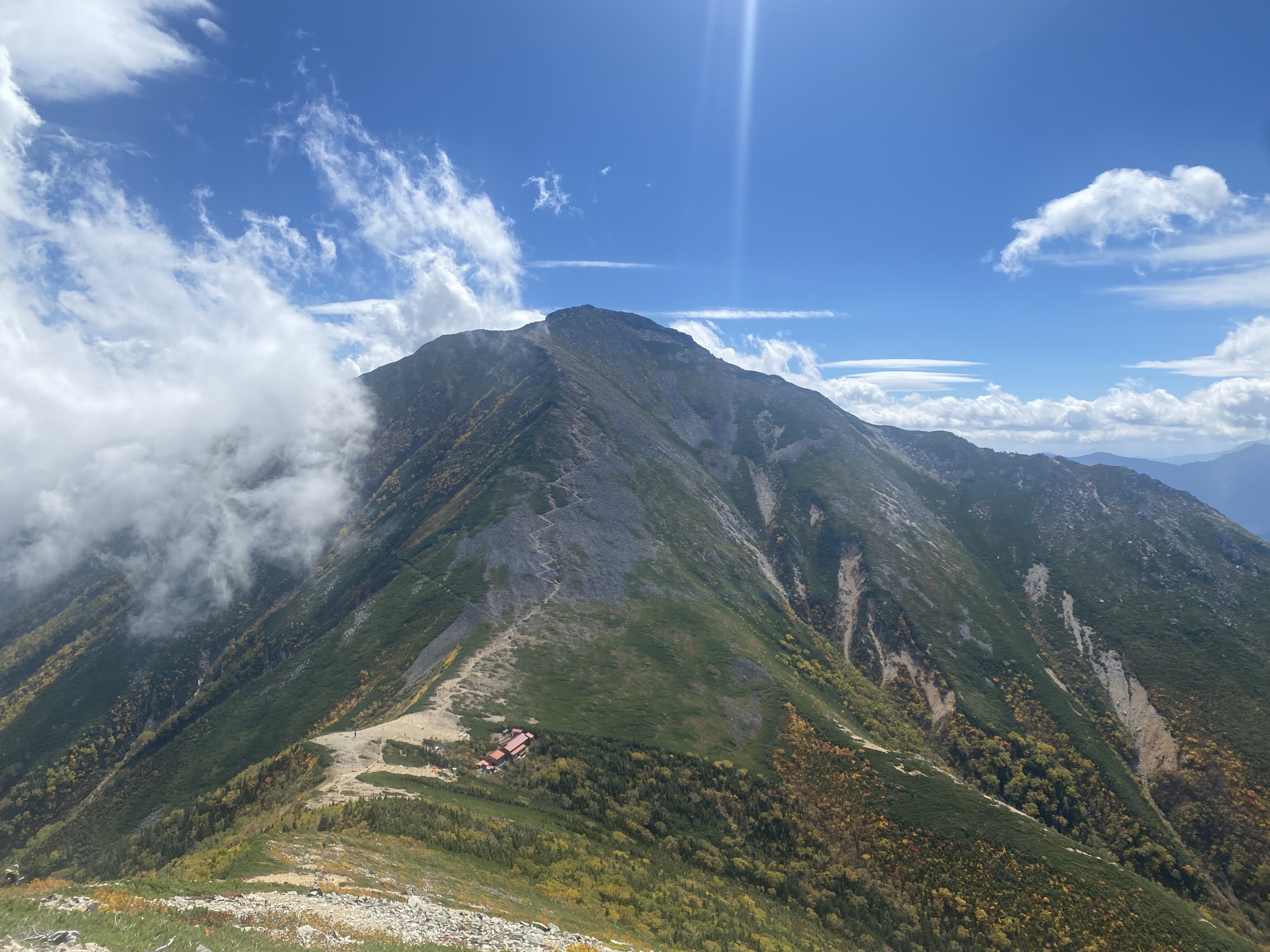
Mount Jonen and Jonen Hut from Mount Yokotoshi, October 2023

== See also ==
- Chūbu-Sangaku National Park
- Hida Mountains
- List of mountains in Japan
- 100 Famous Japanese Mountains
