= Shinhotaka Ropeway =

Aerial lift system in Japan

Coordinates: 36°16′58″N 137°34′49.3″E

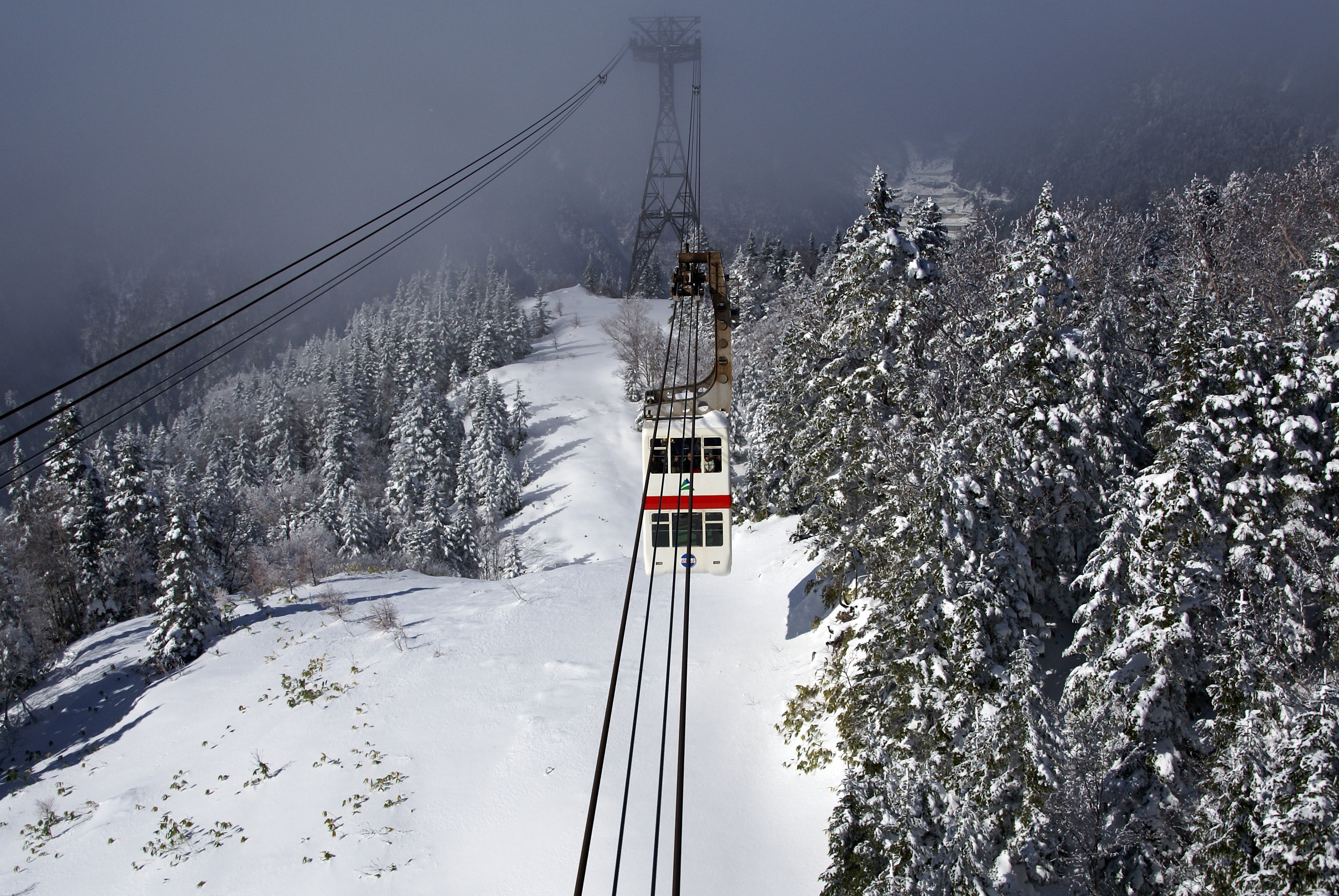
No. 2 Ropeway

The Shinhotaka Ropeway (新穂高ロープウェイ, Shinhotaka Rōpuwei) is an aerial lift system in Takayama, Gifu Prefecture, Japan, and is operated by Okuhi Sightseeing Development (奥飛観光開発, Okuhi Kankō Kaihatsu). The Meitetsu Group company also operates hotels in the area. Opened in 1970, the line climbs to the hillside of the Hida Mountains' Mount Hotaka, the third tallest mountain in Japan.

== Basic data ==
The Shinhotaka Ropeway consists of two lines. Among which Ropeway No. 2 is the first aerial lift in Japan to use double decker cabins.

=== Ropeway No. 1 ===
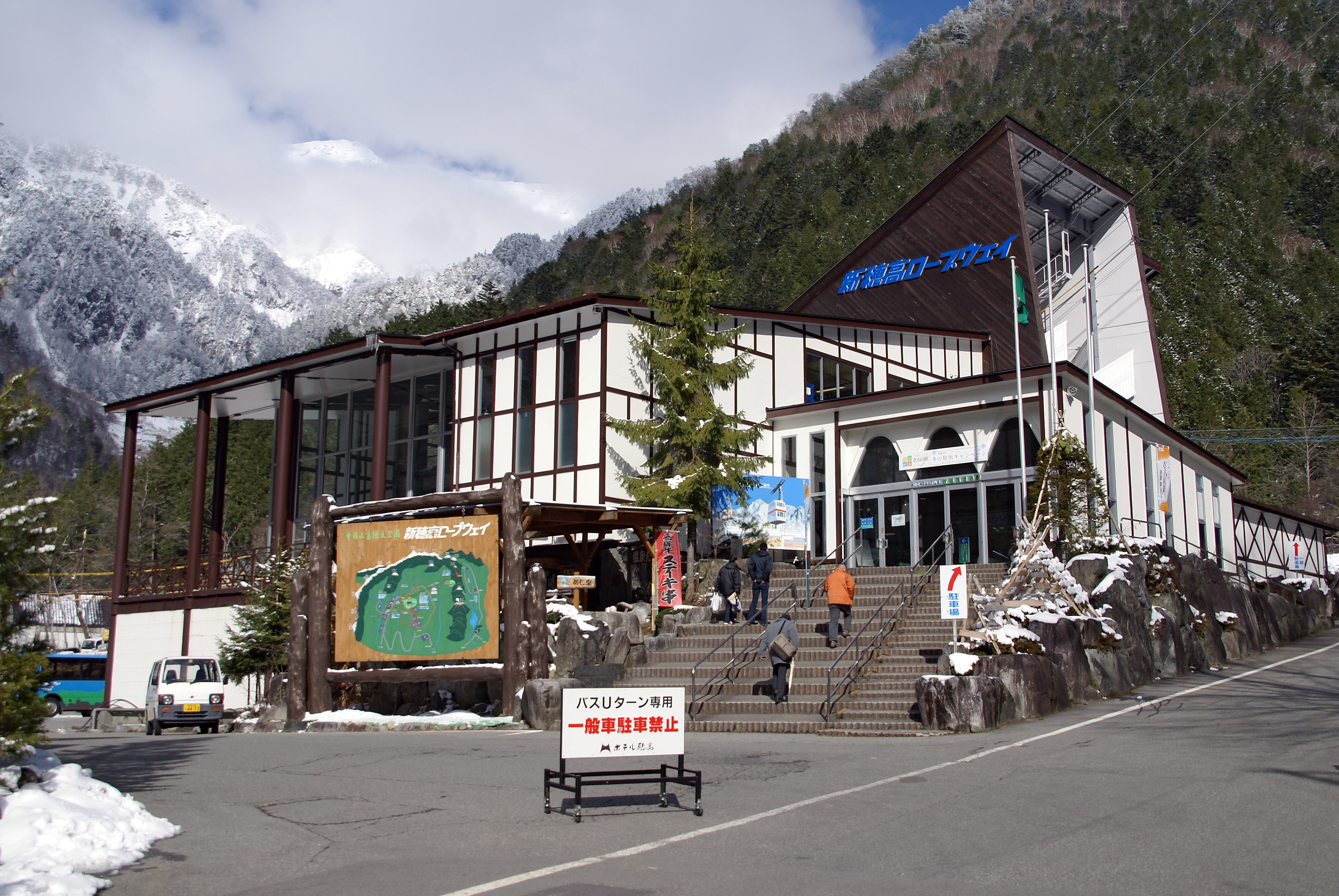
Ropeway No. 1's base station

- System: Aerial tramway, 3 cables
- Cable length: 573 m (1,880 ft)
- Vertical interval: 188 m (617 ft)
- Passenger capacity per a cabin: 45
- Cabins: 2
- Stations: 2
- Duration of one-way trip: 5 minutes

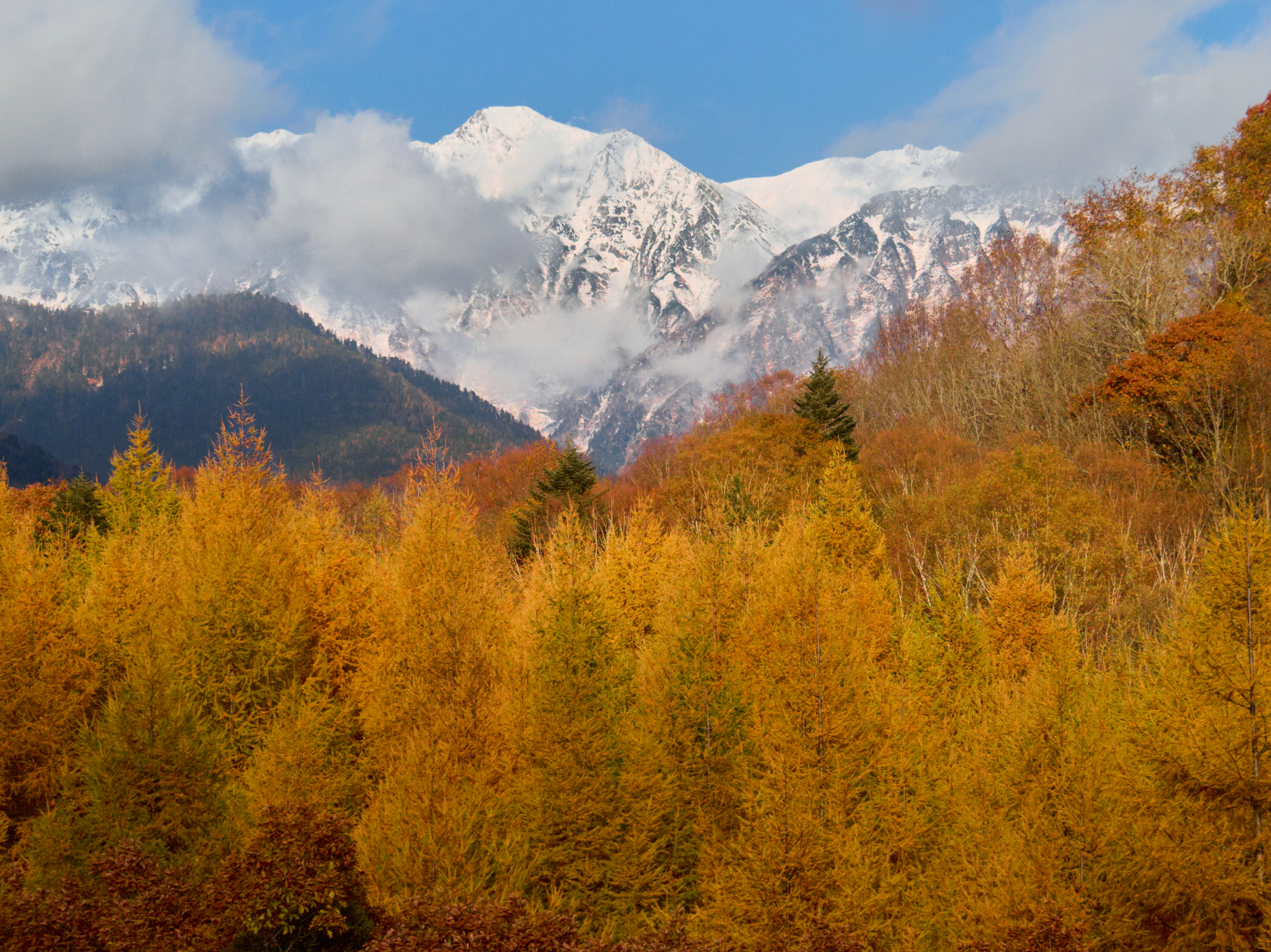
Autumn scenery from Shinhotaka Ropeway.

=== Ropeway No. 2 ===
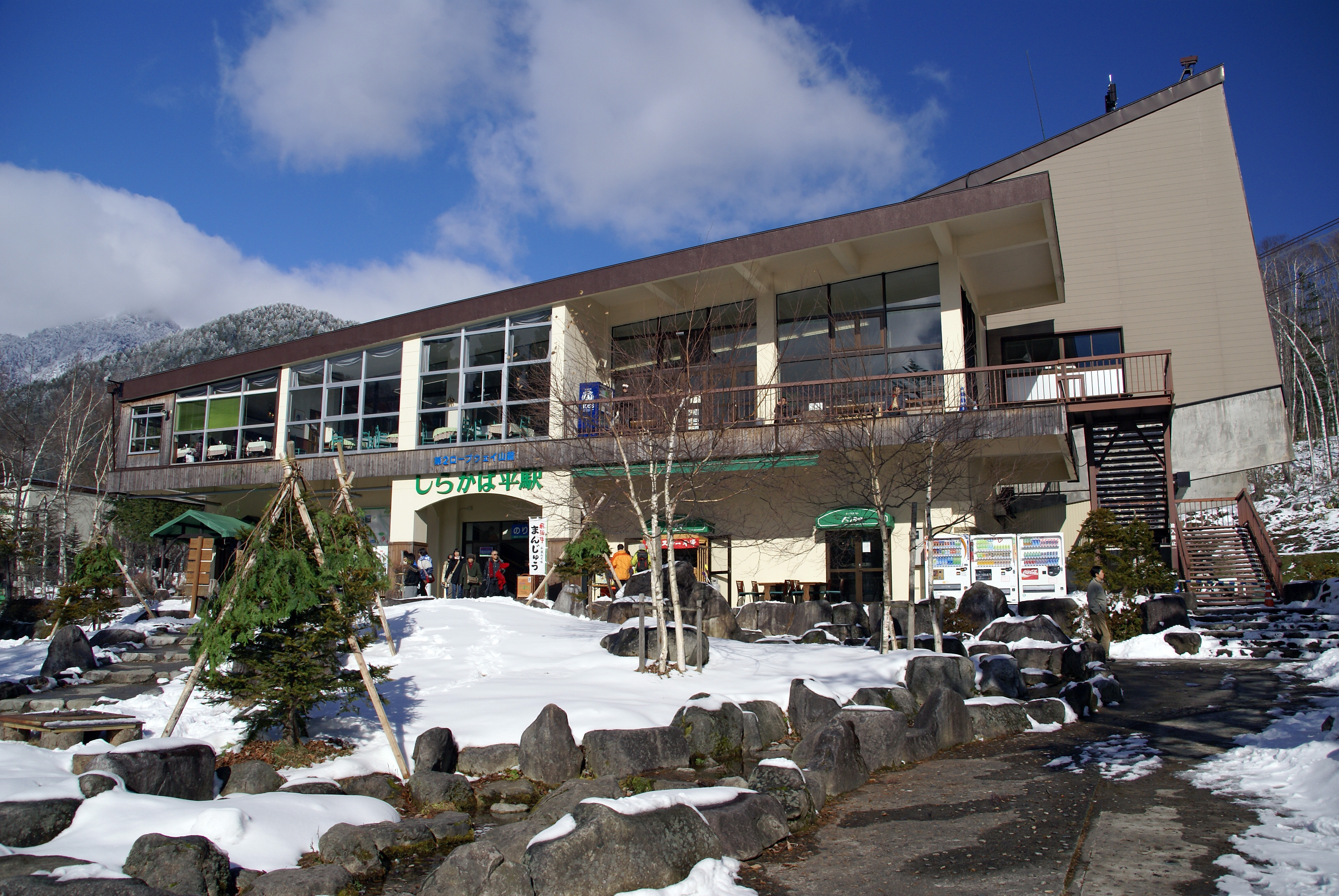
Ropeway No. 2's base station

- System: Aerial tramway, 2 track cables and 2 haulage ropes
- Cable length: 2.6 km (1.6 mi)
- Vertical interval: 848 m (2,782 ft)
- Passenger capacity per a cabin: 121 (double decker)
- Cabins: 2
- Stations: 2
- Duration of one-way trip: 7 minutes

== See also ==
- List of aerial lifts in Japan
