= Hodaka =

Hodaka may refer to:

- Hodaka (motorcycle), a joint Japanese and American company
- Hodaka Maruyama (born 1984), Japanese politician
- Hodaka Yoshida (1926–1995), Japanese artist

== See also ==
- Hotaka (disambiguation)
