= Mount Hotaka (Gunma) =

Mountain in Gunma Prefecture, Japan

Coordinates: 36°48′19″N 139°07′58″E

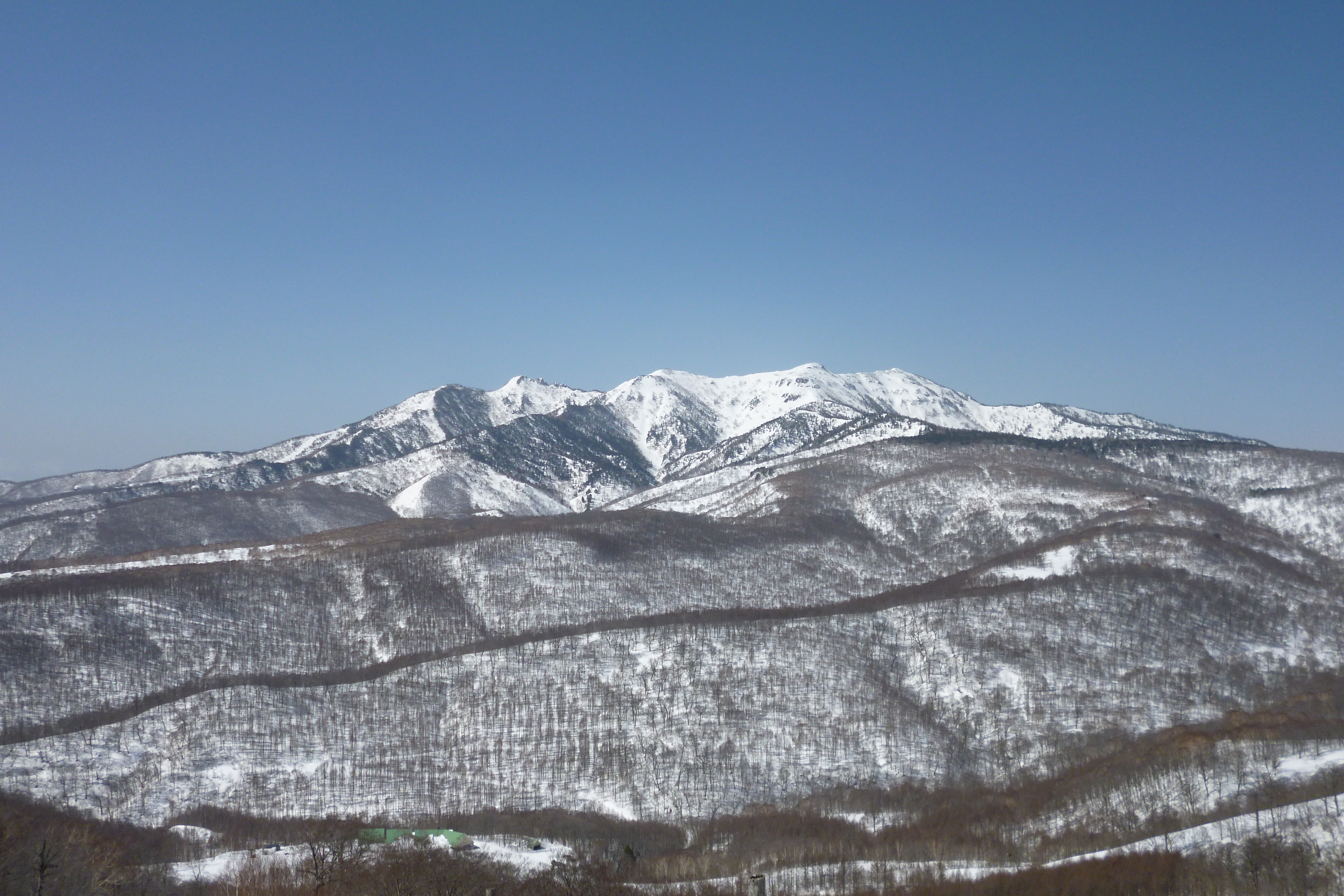
View of Mount Joshu-Hotaka

Mount Hotaka (武尊山 Hotakayama, 上州武尊山 Joshu Hotakayama) is a stratovolcano with its highest peak at the altitude of 2,158m. It is located near Minakami-machi, Kawaba Village, and Katashina Village in the Gunma Prefecture. In order to distinguish it from Mount Hotakadake in the Northern Alps, it is also called as Joshu Hotakayama(上州武尊山). This mountain has been selected as one of "100 Famous Japanese Mountains" and the "New 100 Famous Flower of Japanese Mountains".

== Peaks ==
- Okihotaka (沖武尊 2,158m, main peak）
- Nakanodake (中ノ岳 2,144m）
- Ienokushi (家ノ串 2,103m）
- Maehotaka (前武尊 2,040m）
- Kengamine (剣ヶ峰 2,083m）
- Kengamineyama (剣ヶ峰山 2,020m）
- Shishikogahanayama (獅子ヶ鼻山1,875m）
- Nishimine (西峰 1,871m)

== See also ==
- List of volcanoes in Japan
