= Ghulan Mohammed Hotak =

Taliban member

Ghulan Mohammed Hotak غلام محمد هوتاک
- Born: Afghanistan
- Occupation: Taliban member

Ghulan Mohammed Hotak is an Afghan Taliban.

== Life ==
The Daily Telegraph and the Washington Post published extended accounts of Hotak's defection from the Taliban to the Interim Afghan Government.

During his Combatant Status Review Tribunal and Administrative Review Board Guantanamo captive Gholam Ruhani testified that he believed Hotak was assisting American intelligence on December 9, 2001, the day he was captured. Ruhani testified that the baker whose shop was next to him was acquainted with Hotak, and recommended he call upon Ruhani to serve as a translator between Hotak, another militia leader named Abdul Haq Wasiq, and Americans.

Hotak was reported captured on July 17, 2004. Hotak was reported to have switched allegiance to the Taliban when they started to rise to power in the early 1990s, and to have changed allegiance again to Hamid Karzai as the Taliban fell. Hotak was honored at a ceremony on May 5, 2004 to celebrate the surrender of hundreds of weapons.

Hotak was captured in Wardak, along with his brother and nephew, "because they links to the Taliban".

Hotak is reported to have lobbied the Karzai government to reward his defection from the Taliban with the Governorship of his Province. 700 of his supporters were reported to have demonstrated in the Provincial capital to protest his arrest.

Afghan TV channel Ariana describes Hotak as the "Taliban's chief commander".
