= Mount Hotakadake =

Mountain in Nagano Prefecture, Japan

Mount Hotaka
- 穂高岳
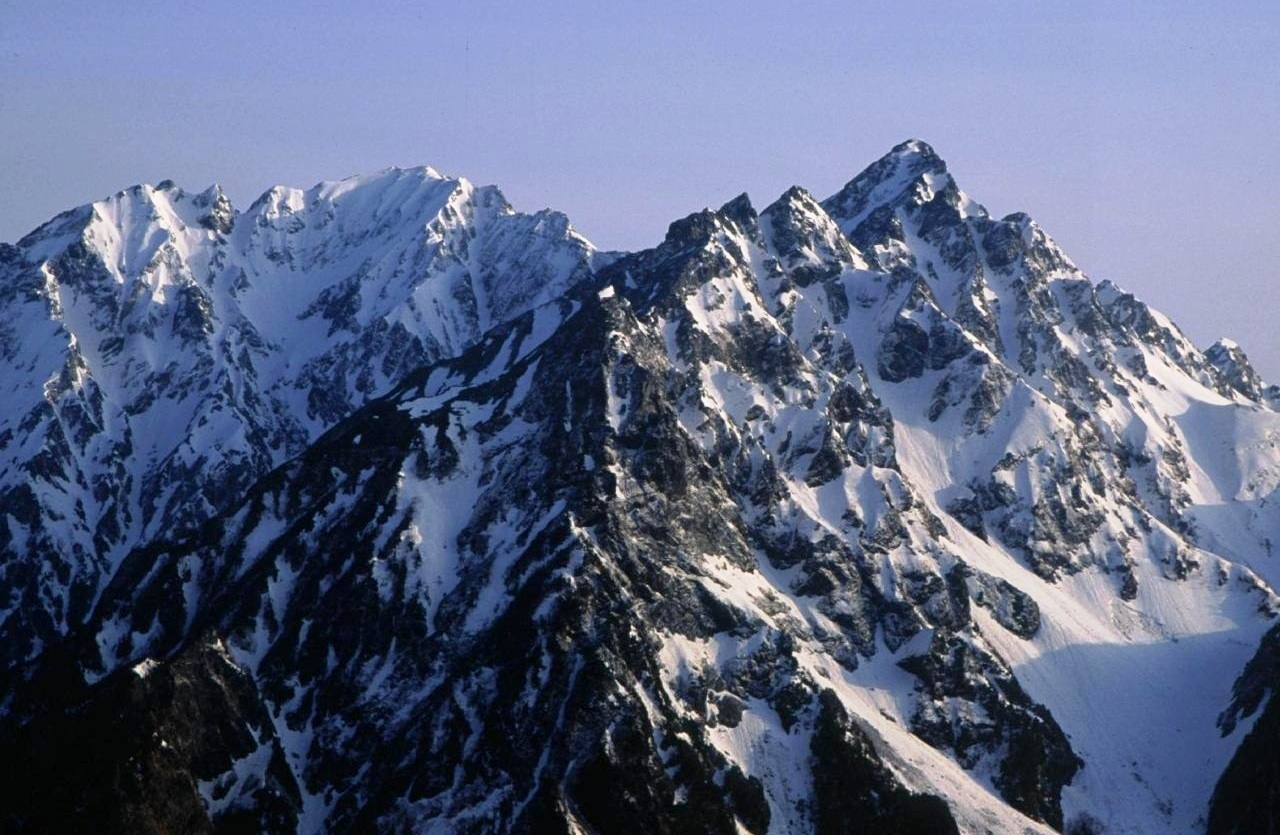
- Mount Hotaka from Tokugō-tōge

Highest point
- Elevation: 3,190 m (10,470 ft)
- Prominence: 2,307 m (7,569 ft)
- Listing: 100 Famous Japanese Mountains; Ultra, Ribu
- Coordinates: 36°17′21″N 137°38′53″E

Naming
- Language of name: Japanese
- Pronunciation: [hotakadake]

Geography
- Location within Japan
- Location: Takayama, Gifu Prefecture; Matsumoto, Nagano Prefecture; Japan
- Parent range: Hida Mountains

Geology
- Mountain type: Pyramidal peak

Climbing
- First ascent: Gunji Abe (1906)
- Easiest route: Hike

Mount Hotaka (穂高岳, Hotaka-dake), also known as Mount Hotakadake, is one of the 100 Famous Japanese Mountains as coined by the media, reaching a height of 3,190 m (10,466 ft). Mount Hotaka is situated in Japan's Hida Mountains and all its major peaks except Mount Maehotaka, lie on the border between the cities of Matsumoto, Nagano Prefecture, and Takayama, Gifu Prefecture. This mountain is located in Chūbu-Sangaku National Park.

The peaks of Okuhotaka, Karasawa, Kitahotaka, Maehotaka and Nishihotaka are called the Hotaka Mountains. The highest peak in this range, and also the tallest mountain in both Nagano and Gifu prefectures, is Mount Okuhotaka. Mount Hotaka is also referred to as the "Leader of the Northern Alps" (北アルプスの盟主, Kita-Arupusu no Meishu).

== Peaks ==
- Mount Okuhotaka (奥穂高岳, Okuhotakadake) is the highest peak in the Hotaka Mountain Range and the third highest in Japan after Mount Fuji and Mount Kita. Its peak at 3,190 m (10,466 ft) is the highest in Nagano and Gifu prefectures.
- Mount Karasawa (涸沢岳, Karasawa-dake) is situated on a ridge between Mount Kitahotaka and the Shirade Col (白出のコル), the location of the Hotakadake mountain cottage. The triangulation point on the top is at 3,103 m (10,180 ft) while the peak reaches 3,110 m (10,203 ft).
- Mount Kitahotaka (北穂高岳, Kitahotaka-dake), at 3,106 m (10,190 ft), is the second highest of the Hotaka peaks, lying at the northern end of the range. Takidani (滝谷), on the mountain's west face, is a well-known, prominent, rocky area of Japan. Near the summit lies the Kitahotaka Hut.
- Mount Maehotaka (前穂高岳, Maehotaka-dake) is 3,090 m (10,138 ft) high and is connected to Mount Okuhotaka via the Tsuri Ridge (吊り尾根, Tsuri-one). To the north stretches the Kita Ridge (北尾根, Kita-one). To the west are rocks in direction of Okumatashiro (奥又白). The tip of the Kita Ridge is called "Byōbu no Atama" (屏風の頭, Folding Screen Head). On the northeastern face lies a sheer cliff of 1,000 m (3,281 ft).
- Mount Myōjin (明神岳, Myōjin-dake), with a peak of 2,931 m (9,616 ft), lies on a mountain ridge stretching south from Mount Maehotaka. There are many climbing routes in this area.
- Mount Nishihotaka (西穂高岳, Nishihotaka-dake), at 2,909 m (9,544 ft), lies on a mountain ridge running southwest from Mount Okuhotaka, near the end of the ridge. It is surrounded by many similarly rocky peaks which makes it difficult to discriminate visually.
- Mount Aino (間ノ岳, Aino-dake), with a peak at 2,907 m (9,537 ft), lies on a ridge between Mount Okuhotaka and Mount Nishihotaka.
- Gamadafuji (蒲田富士, Gamadafuji) is the western peak of Karasawadake, rising 2,742 m (8,996 ft). The winter ascend route to Mount Okuhotaka passes here.

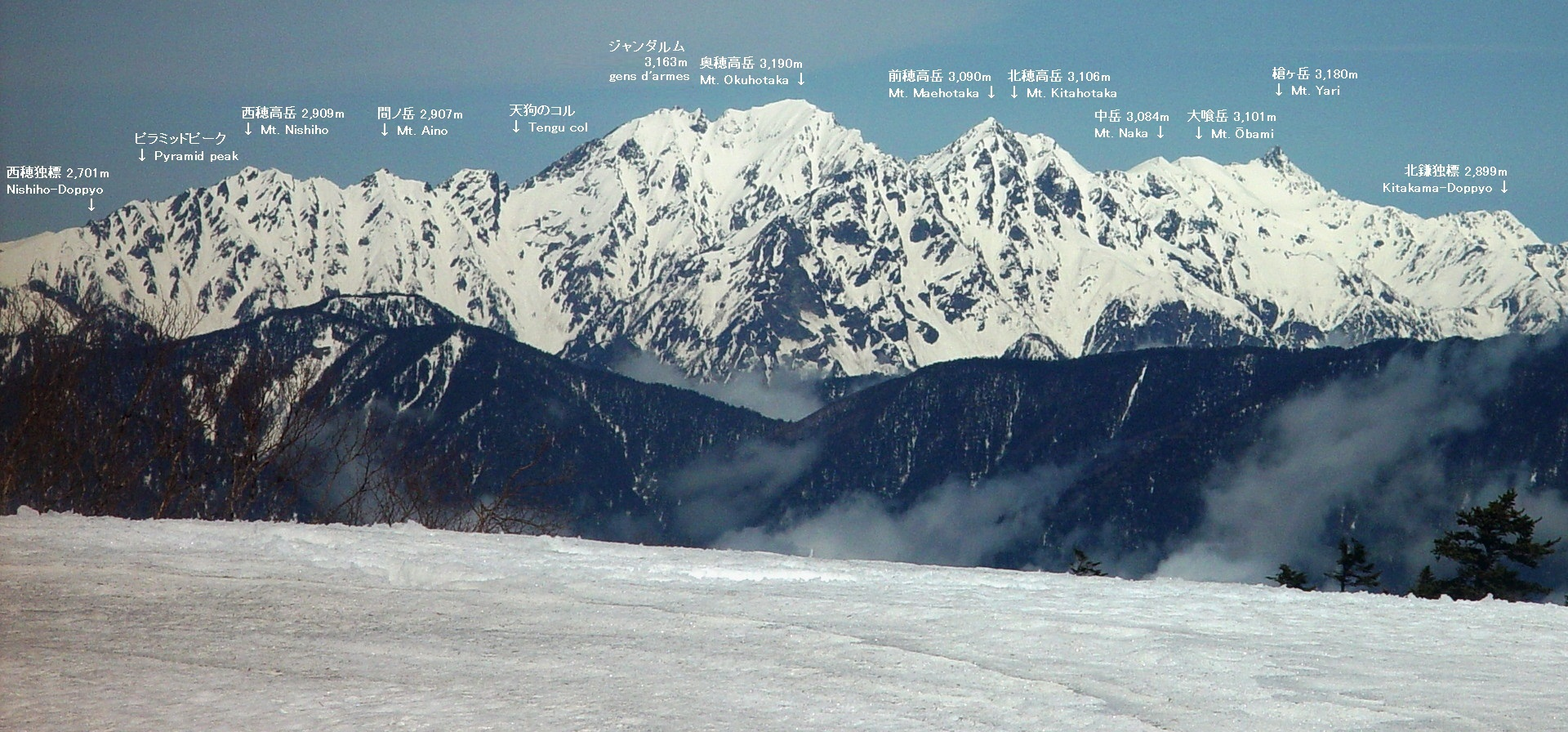
Peaks of Mount Hotaka and Mount Yari of southern Hida Mountains (called "Northern Alps" in Japan) seen from Mount Hachimori (from east).

== History ==
- 1880 - William Gowland climbed Mount Myōjin, guided by local hunter Kamijō Kamonji.
- 1893 - Kiyohiko Tate climbed Mount Maehotaka, then Walter Weston climbed Mount Maehotaka. Walter Weston published Mountaineering and Exploring in the Japanese Alps (1896) and introduced Japanese mountains to the world.
- 1906 - Gunji Abe climbed Mount Okuhotaka at first.
- 1912 - Walter Weston climbed Mount Okuhotaka.
- December 4, 1934 - The region in this mountain was specified for the Chūbu-Sangaku National Park.

== Hiking routes ==
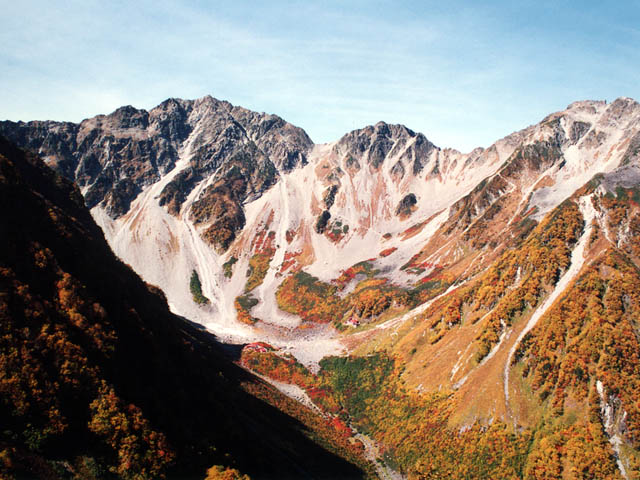
Hotaka Mountains from the panorama course Byōbu-no-mimi (October 2000)

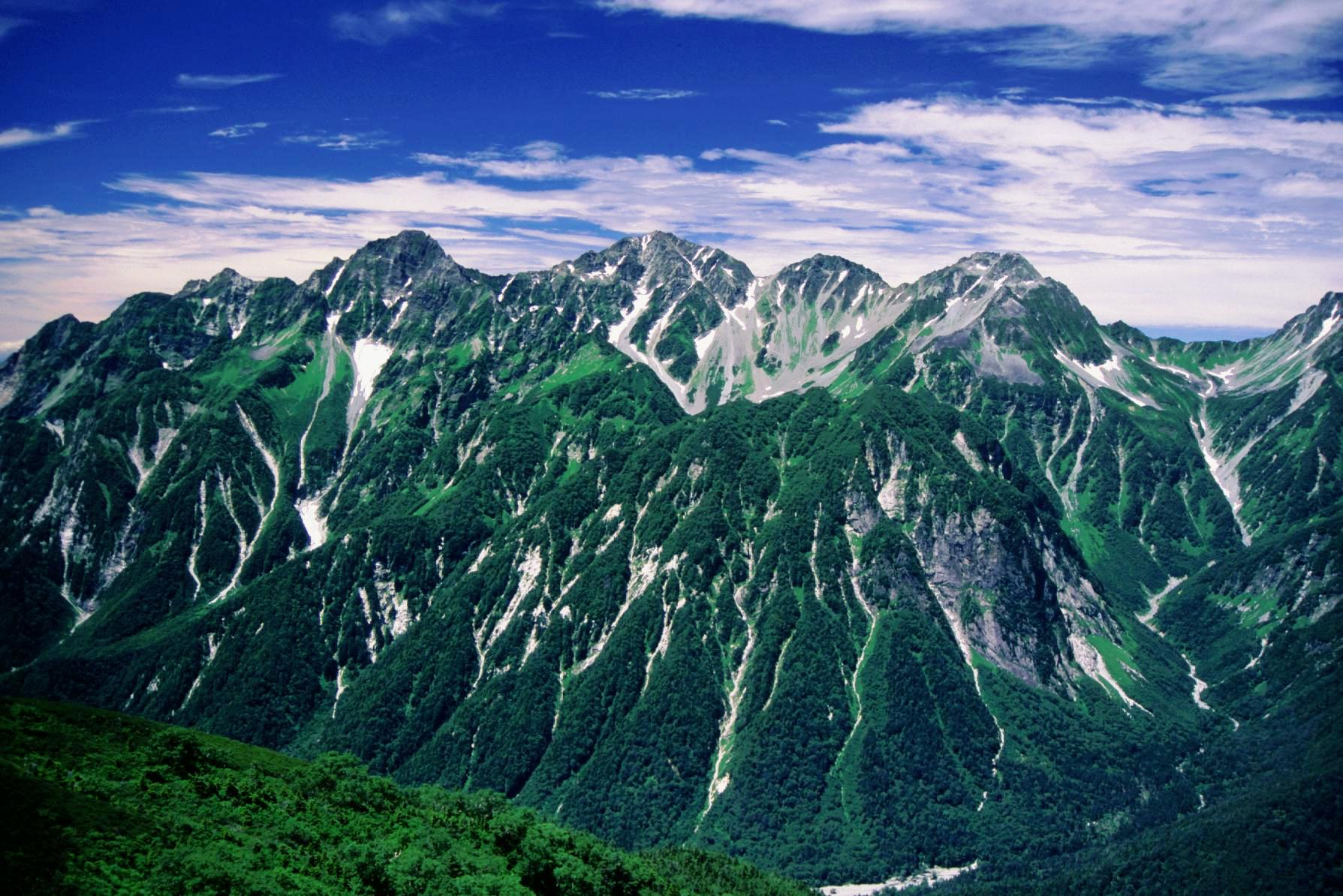
Mt. Hotaka from Mount Chō

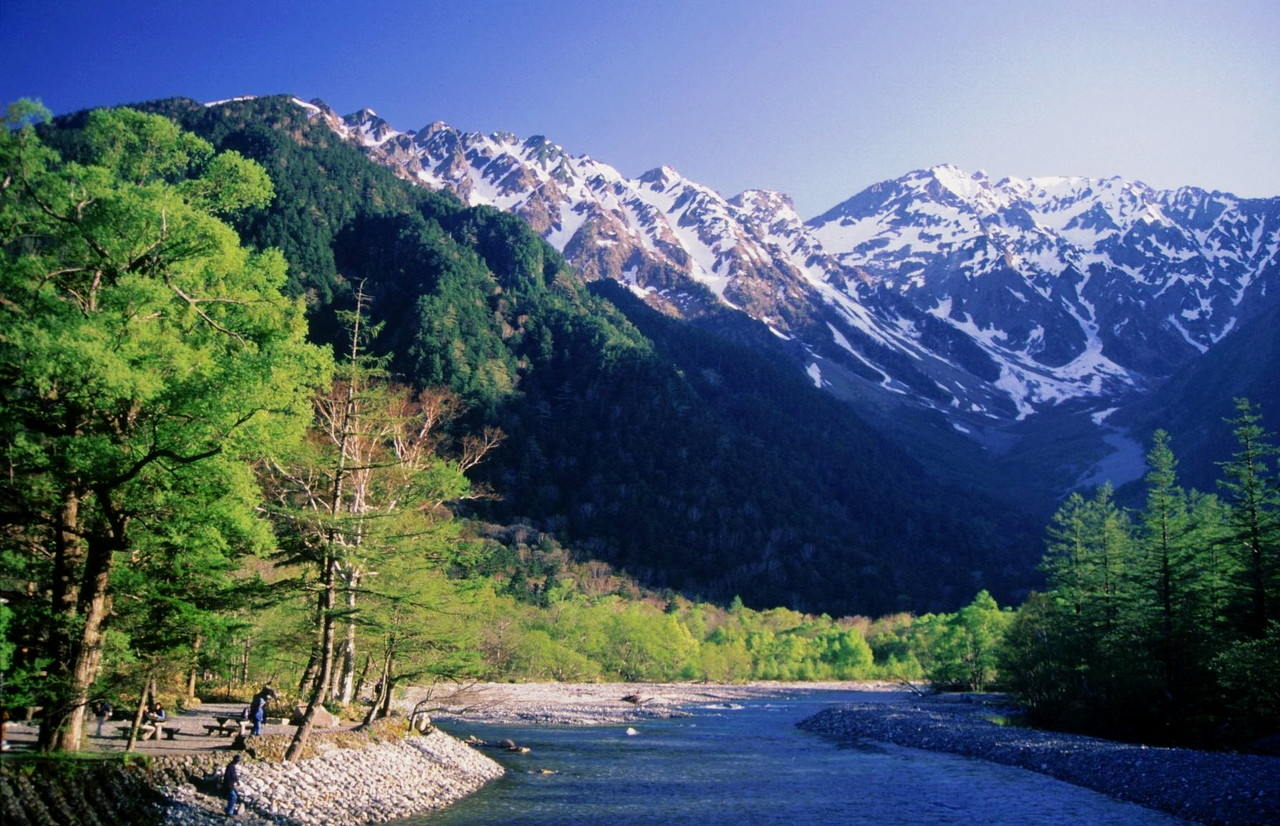
Mt. Hotaka and Azusa River from Kamikōchi

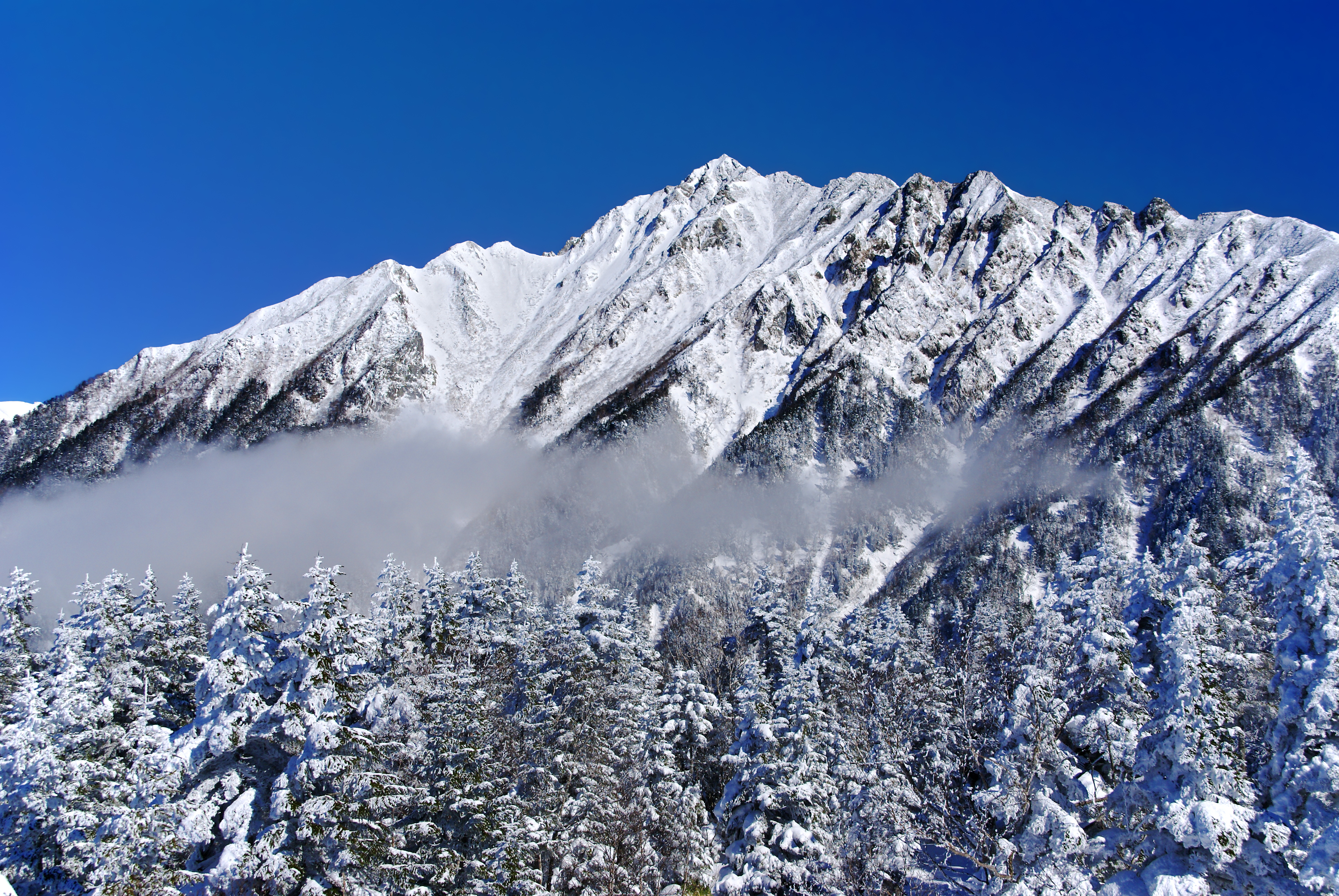
Mt. Nishi-hotaka, 2909 m

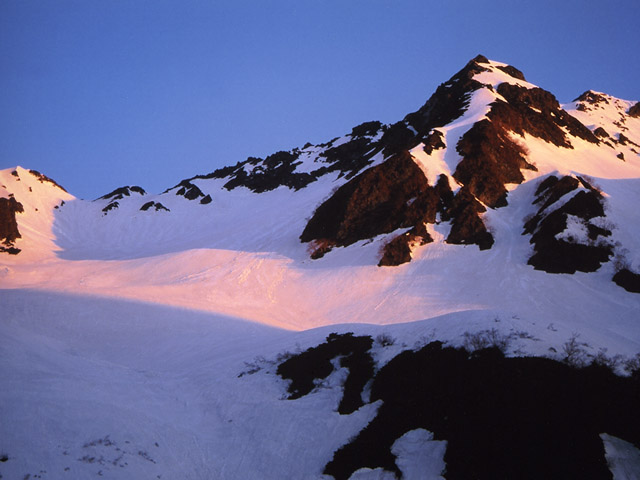
Mt. Kitahotaka from Karasawa glacier (May 2003)

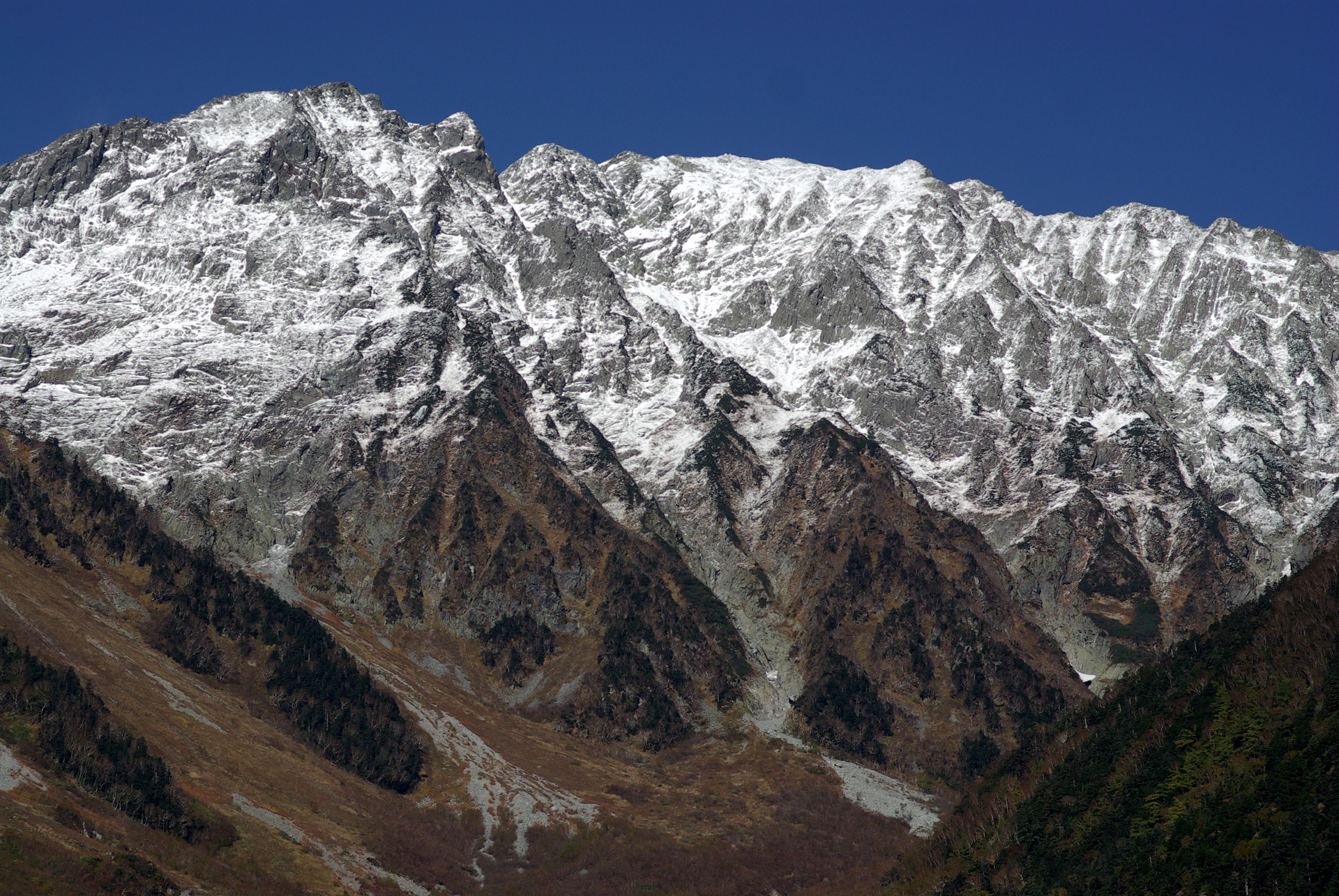
Mt. OkuHotaka,3190m from kamikōchi (October 2007)

Even though the Hotaka Mountains are often climbed during times of lingering snow, like Golden Week, the following routes are strictly for snow-free periods. When snow has fallen, the area becomes extremely dangerous. Routes may become impassable, so special care is required.

The mountain climbing base at Karasawa lies in a U-shaped cirque dominated by Mount Okuhotaka, Mount Maehotaka and the Tsuri Ridge connecting the two. Because it lies on the northern side of the mountains, snow remains throughout the year.

To the north, beyond a steep descent and ascent at the Daikiretto, the ridge continues across Mount Minami (南岳, Minami-dake), Mount Ōbami (大喰岳, Ōbami-dake), ending at Mount Yari. In the south, a ridge stretches from Mount Okuhotaka via Mount Nishihotaka to Mount Yake. The Tsuri Ridge runs from Mount Okuhotaka to Mount Maehotaka, from where a path leads down through a cirque to the bridge Kappabashi in Kamikōchi. Climbing down on the Gifu side, either from the Hotaka Mountain Cottage (穂高岳山荘, Hotakadake Sansō) through Shiradezawa (白出沢, shiradezawa) or taking the Shinhotaka Ropeway from next to Nishihotaka-dake, the road and Shinhodaka Onsen (新穂高温泉, Shinhodaka-onsen) can be reached in the valley below.

=== Beginner ===
- Mount Okuhotaka

Kamikōchi ― Lake Myōjin (明神池, Myōjin-ike) ― Tokusawa (徳沢) ― Yokoo (横尾) ― Karasawa Cirque― Mount Okuhotaka
Kamikōchi ― Lake Myōjin ― Tokusawa ― Panorama course (Byōbunoatama) ― Karasawa Cirque― Mount Okuhotaka

(Note that in both cases the part from Karasawa to Mount Okuhotaka is actually more at the intermediate level)

- Mount Kitahotaka

Kamikōchi ― Lake Myōjin ― Tokusawa ― Yokoo ― Karasawa Cirque― Mount Kitahotaka

- Nishihodoku (西穂独標)

Shinhodaka Onsen ― Shinhotaka Ropeway ― Nishiho Mountain Cottage ― Maruyama (丸山) ― Nishihodoku
Kamikōchi ― Naka Ridge (中尾根, Nakaone) ― Nishiho Mountain Cottage ― Maruyama ― Nishihodoku

=== Intermediate ===
- Mount Maehotaka - Mount Okuhotaka

Kamikōchi ― Dakesawa Mountain Hut ― Kimikodaira (紀美子平) ― Mount Maehotaka ― Mount Okuhotaka

The ascent from the Dakesawa Hut to Kimikodaira, (Jūtarō New Road (重太郎新道, Jūtarō Shindō)) is the steepest in the Japanese Alps. There is no water on this ascent, and if climbing both mountains, the route to Mount Okuhotaka and Mount Maehotaka via Karasawa is more popular.

=== Advanced ===
- Yarihotaka traverse route

Mount Yari― Mount Ōbami (大喰岳, Ōbami-dake) ― Mount Naka (中岳, Naka-dake) ― Mount Minami (南岳, Minami-dake) ― Daikiretto (大キレット) ― Mount Kitahotaka ― Mount Karasawa ― Mount Okuhotaka ― Gendarme (ジャンダルム, jandarumu) ― Mount Aino ― Mount Nishihotaka ― Nishihodoku

== Mountain huts ==
There are various alpine huts in the Mount Hotaka area:

- Hotaka Mountain Cottage (穂高岳山荘, Hotakadake Sansō)
- Kitahotaka Hut (北穂高小屋, Kitahotaka-goya)
- Karasawa Hut (涸沢小屋, Karasawa-goya)
- Karasawa Mountain Hut (涸沢ヒュッテ, Karasawa-hyutte)
- Nishiho Mountain Cottage (西穂山荘, Nishiho Sansō)
- Hotakatairahinan Hut (穂高平避難小屋, Hotakatairahinan-goya)

== See also ==
- List of mountains in Japan
- List of Ultras of Japan
- 100 Famous Japanese Mountains
- Three-thousanders (in Japan)
- Kamikōchi
- Mount Yari
- Hida Mountains - Chūbu-Sangaku National Park
- Tourism in Japan
- Karasawa Cirque
