= Narakawa, Nagano =

Dissolved municipality in Nagano prefecture, Japan

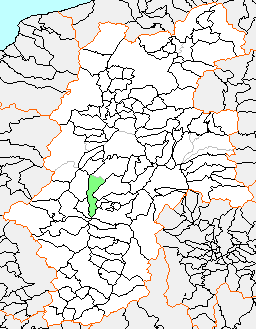
Location of Narakawa in Nagano Prefecture

Narakawa (楢川村, Narakawa-mura) was a village located in Kiso District, Nagano Prefecture, Japan.

On April 1, 2005, Narakawa was merged into the expanded city of Shiojiri.

As of October 1, 2004, the former village had an estimated population of 3,393. The total area was 117.82 km^{2}.

== Geography ==
Surrounding municipalities

- Ina, Shiojiri
- Kiso District: Kiso, Hiyoshi
- Higashichikuma District: Asahi
- Kamiina District: Tatsuno, Minamiminowa

== Sister cities ==
- Fukuroi (Shizuoka Prefecture) — Signed on October 28, 2001
