= Kiso =

Kiso may refer to:

== Geography ==
- Kiso, Nagano (village), a village in Kiso District, Nagano
- Kiso, Nagano (town), a town in Kiso District, Nagano
- Kiso District, Nagano, a district located in Nagano Prefecture, Japan.
- Kiso Mountains, a mountain range in Nagano and Gifu prefectures in Japan
- Kiso Observatory, an astronomical observatory located at Mt. Ontake in Japan
- Kiso River, a river in Japan
- Kiso Valley

== Other ==
- Japanese cruiser Kiso
- Kisō (Demonic Burial), an album by Dir en grey
- KISO (FM), a radio station (96.1 FM) licensed to serve Omaha, Nebraska, United States
- The ICAO airport code for Kinston Regional Jetport
