= Yabuhara Station =

Railway station in Kiso, Nagano Prefecture, Japan

Yabuhara Station 藪原駅
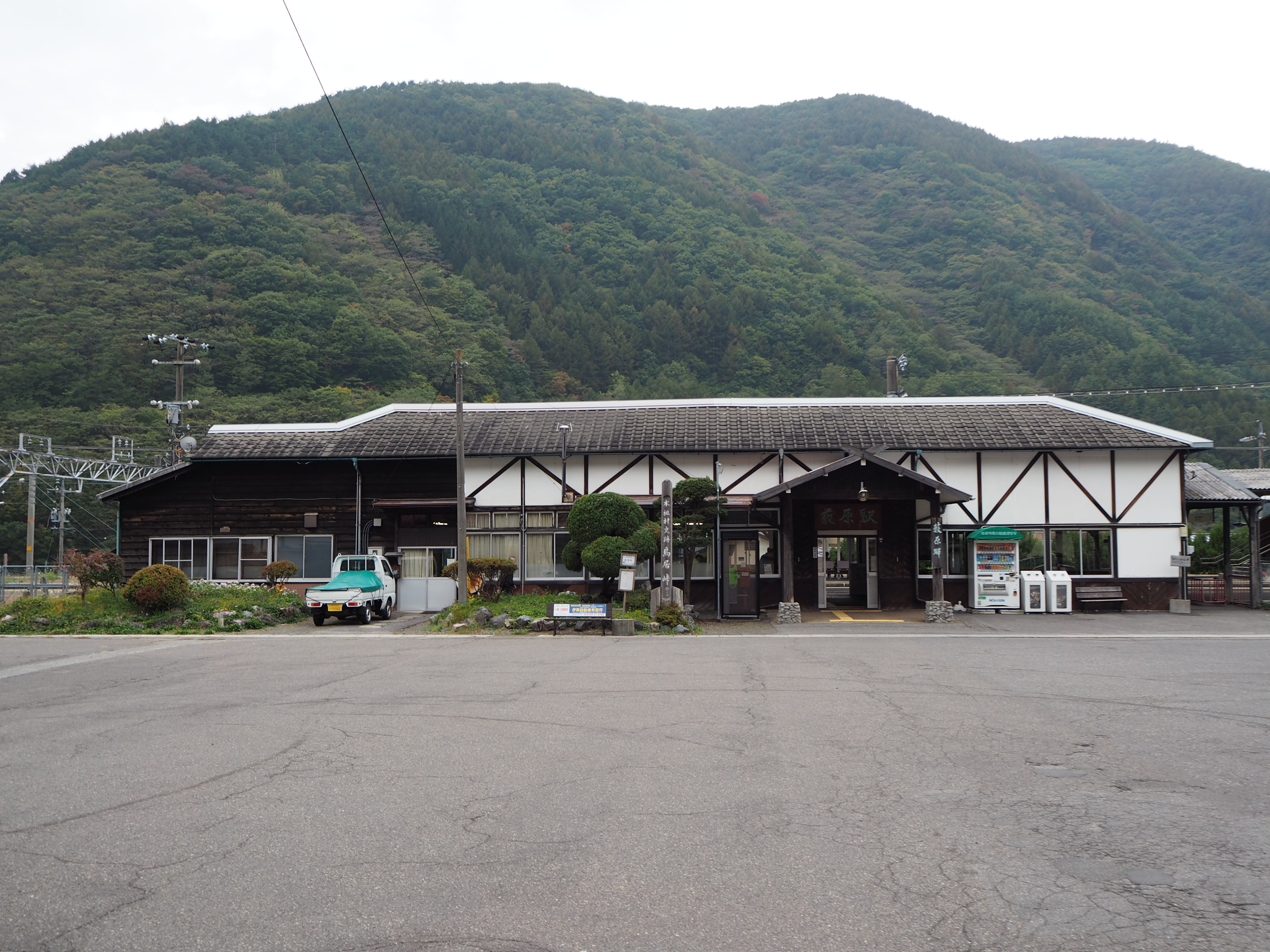
- Yabuhara Station in October 2015

General information
- Location: Yabuhara, Kiso-mura, Kiso-gun, Nagano-ken 399-6201; Japan
- Coordinates: 35.9304°N 137.7842°E
- Elevation: 924.2 meters
- Operator: JR Central
- Line: Chūō Main Line
- Distance: 249.8 km from Tokyo
- Platforms: 1 side + 1 island platform
- Tracks: 3

Other information
- Status: Staffed

History
- Opened: 5 October 1910; 115 years ago

Passengers
- FY2015: 135 daily
Location
- Location within Nagano Prefecture Location within Japan

Yabuhara Station (藪原駅, Yabuhara-eki) is a railway station of Chūō Main Line, Central Japan Railway Company in Yabuhara, Kiso Village, Kiso District, Nagano Prefecture, Japan.

== Lines ==
Yabuhara Station is served by the JR Tōkai Chūō Main Line, and is located 249.8 kilometers from the official starting point of the line at Tokyo and 147.1 kilometers from Nagoya.

== Layout ==
The station has one side platform and one island platform connected by a footbridge. The station is staffed.

=== Platforms ===
1	■ Chūō Main Line	For Nakatsugawa and Nagoya
2, 3	■ Chūō Main Line	For Shiojiri and Nagano

== Adjacent stations ==
←	Service	→
JR Central Chūō Main Line
Narai	Local	Miyanokoshi

== History ==
Yabuhara Station was opened on 5 October 1910. On 1 April 1987, it became part of JR Tōkai.

== Passenger statistics ==
In fiscal 2015, the station was used by an average of 189 passengers daily (boarding passengers only).

== Surrounding area ==
- Kiso Village Hall
- Yabuhara Post Office
- National Route 19

== See also ==
- List of railway stations in Japan
