= 1984 Nagano earthquake =

Earthquake in Japan

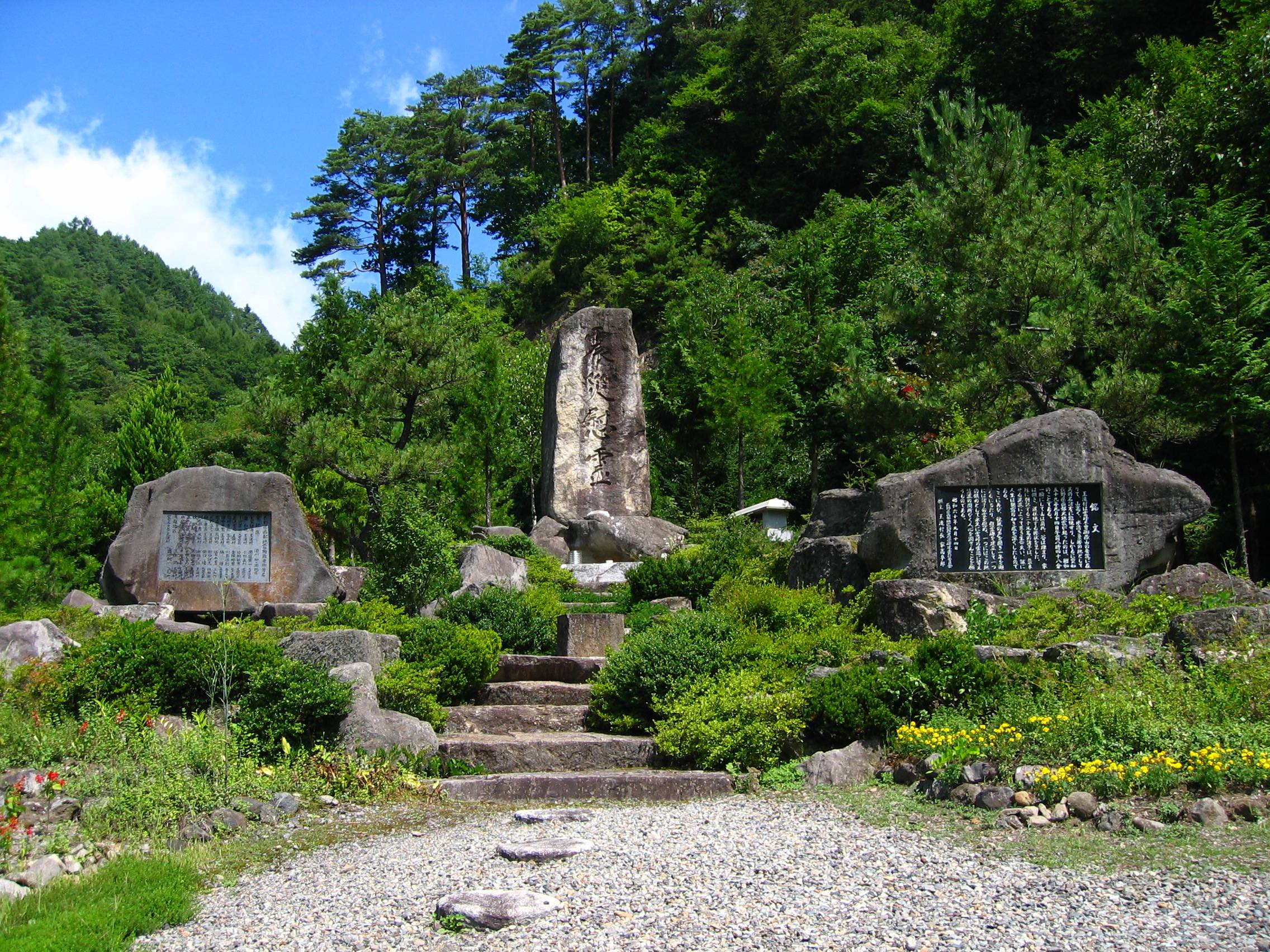
- Earthquake cenotaph

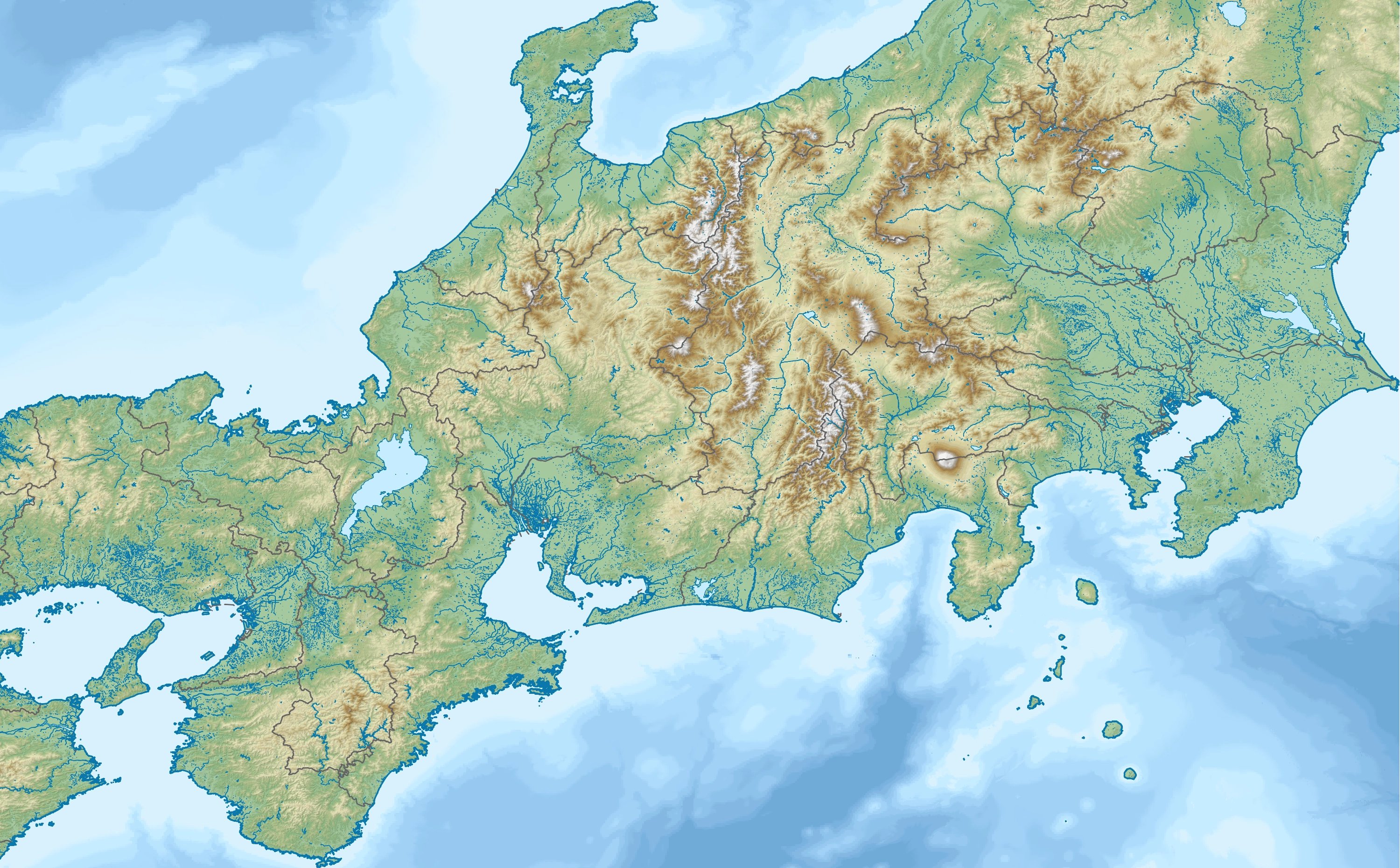
- Location within Nagano Prefecture Location within Central Japan
- UTC time: 1984-09-13 23:48:49
- ISC event: 543747
- USGS-ANSS: ComCat
- Local date: September 14, 1984
- Local time: 08:48
- Magnitude: M_{s} 6.3 (M_{JMA} 6.8)
- Depth: 2 km (1 mi)
- Epicenter: 35.8°N 137.6°E
- Type: Intraplate
- Areas affected: Japan
- Max. intensity: MMI VIII (Severe) JMA 6−
- Peak acceleration: ~ 0.3 g
- Tsunami: No
- Landslides: Yes
- Casualties: 14 dead 10 injured 15 missing

The 1984 Nagano earthquake (Japanese: 長野県西部地震) hit the western part of Nagano Prefecture, Japan on September 14, 1984, at 08:48 local time (September 13, 1984, at 23:48 UTC). Registering a magnitude of M_{s} 6.3, the earthquake destroyed Otaki (Japanese: 王滝(おうたき)), and triggered major landslides. The earthquake left at least 29 people dead or missing, making it the deadliest earthquake in 1984.

== Geology ==
Although the epicenter was only 2 km (1 mi) deep, no visible fault appeared. The Japan Meteorological Agency estimated that two faults, one 15 km (9 mi) long and one 5 km (3 mi) long had ruptured simultaneously.

=== Relation to other earthquakes ===
Seismologists including Akeo Yoshida state that the 1948 Fukui earthquake, a 7.0 M_{JMA} earthquake in Gifu Prefecture, 6.6 M_{JMA} earthquake in Gifu Prefecture in 1969 and this earthquake were earthquakes that occurred in a cycle in small period of time in the same area.

== Main shock ==
Since, there was no seismometer in the area Japan Meteorological Agency made an estimate intensity Shindo 6. Some unofficial estimates put it to Shindo 7. There are reports that rocks and pieces of wood flew in the air near the epicenter, due to ground accelerations faster than gravitational acceleration in the 5 Hz~10 Hz shaking range. A seismometer at Makio Dam, 4 km (2 mi) away from the epicenter observed very strong shaking but could not record more than 0.3 g which was the limit.

== Damage ==
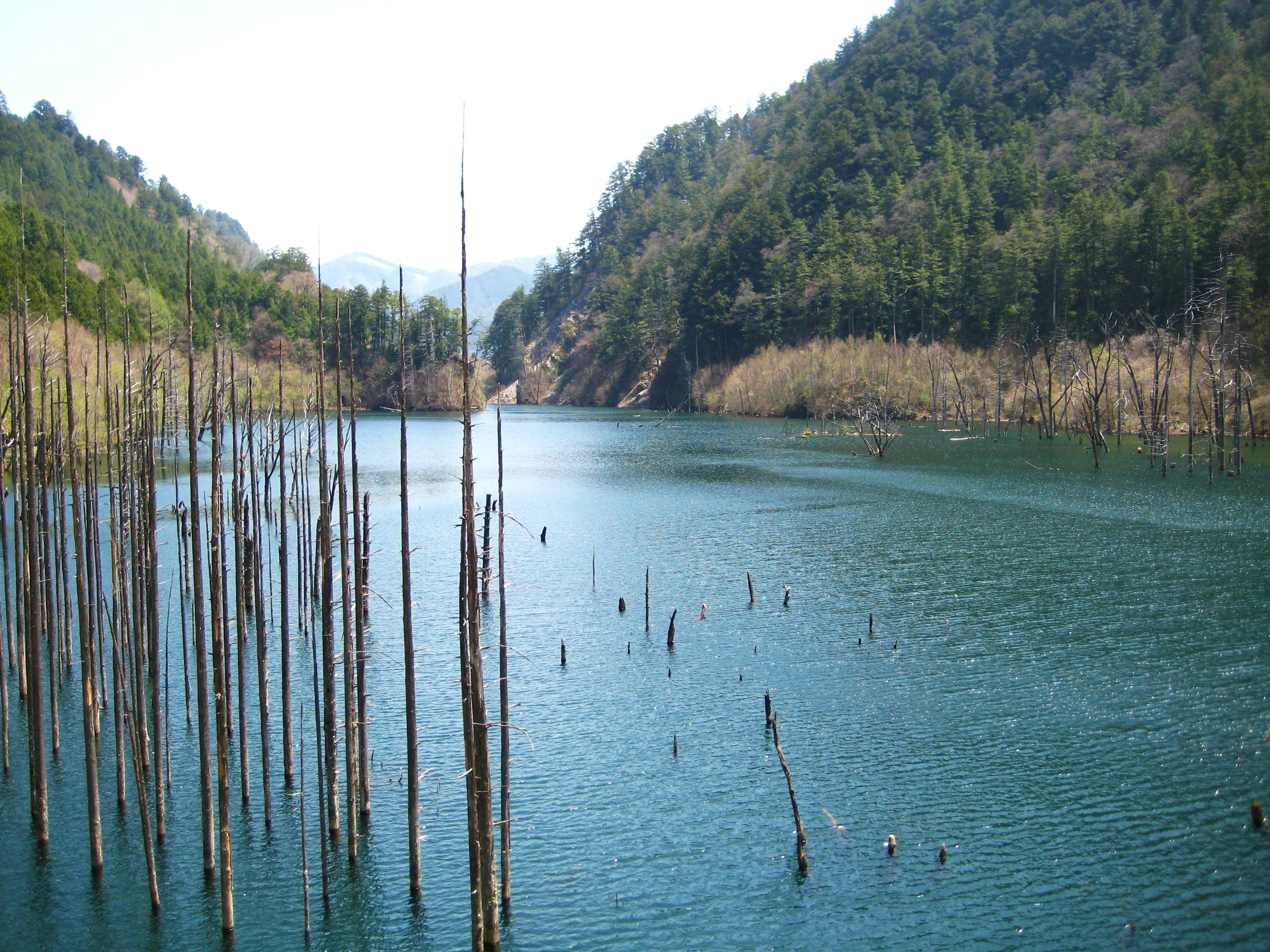
This lake was formed after a part of the Otaki river was blocked by a landslide

Due to torrential rains in the area before the earthquake, many landslides occurred.

Total Damage
Dead	14
Missing	15
Injured	10
Collapsed buildings	14
Half collapsed buildings	73
Damaged Buildings	517
Economic cost	US$28 million

=== Incidents ===
- A massive landslide occurred on the south side of Mount Ontake, sending 3.45 million cubic meters of earth at estimated speeds of 80 to 100 km/h down the side of the mountain and buried over 3 km (2 mi) of land including a hot spring facility, under 50 m (164 ft) of earth. A nearby valley was completely buried under 30 m (98 ft) of earth. The four people in the facility's owner's family and five people who were looking for mushrooms in the area were also buried and went missing.
- A large landslide in the Matsugoe District caused part of an inn and a road to collapse and crash into a concrete factory on the bottom of the slope, killing 13 people working in the forest and the factory. There were no people staying at the inn and the owner miraculously survived since she was able to stay on her tatami mat and rode the landslide as it swept down. She was able to climb up the cliff caused by the landslide even though she was badly injured. She was found and hospitalized for 2 weeks.
- A house in the Takigoe District collapsed after a landslide crashed into it, killing one person.
- Five people who were driving in the Kōrigase District were buried in a landslide and became missing. Two people were able to survive by running away from the landslide.
- One person became missing in the Yanagigase District.
- A man driving a truck was killed after being swept away by a landslide.
- A lake was formed after a landslide blocked a river.

== Precursors ==
- According to Nagoya University, hot spring observatories near the epicenter recorded a big difference in the ratio of methane and argon, and the amount of hydrogen before the earthquake. The change in the amount of hydrogen is thought to be from small fissures that were formed before the main earthquake.
- A change in the percentage of radon was observed by 141 observatories over 3 faults, including the Japan Median Tectonic Line.

== Response ==
Nine check dams were built on Mount Ontake in four years after the earthquake.

== See also ==
- 1948 Fukui earthquake
