= Ōtaki, Nagano =

Ōtaki 王滝村
- Village
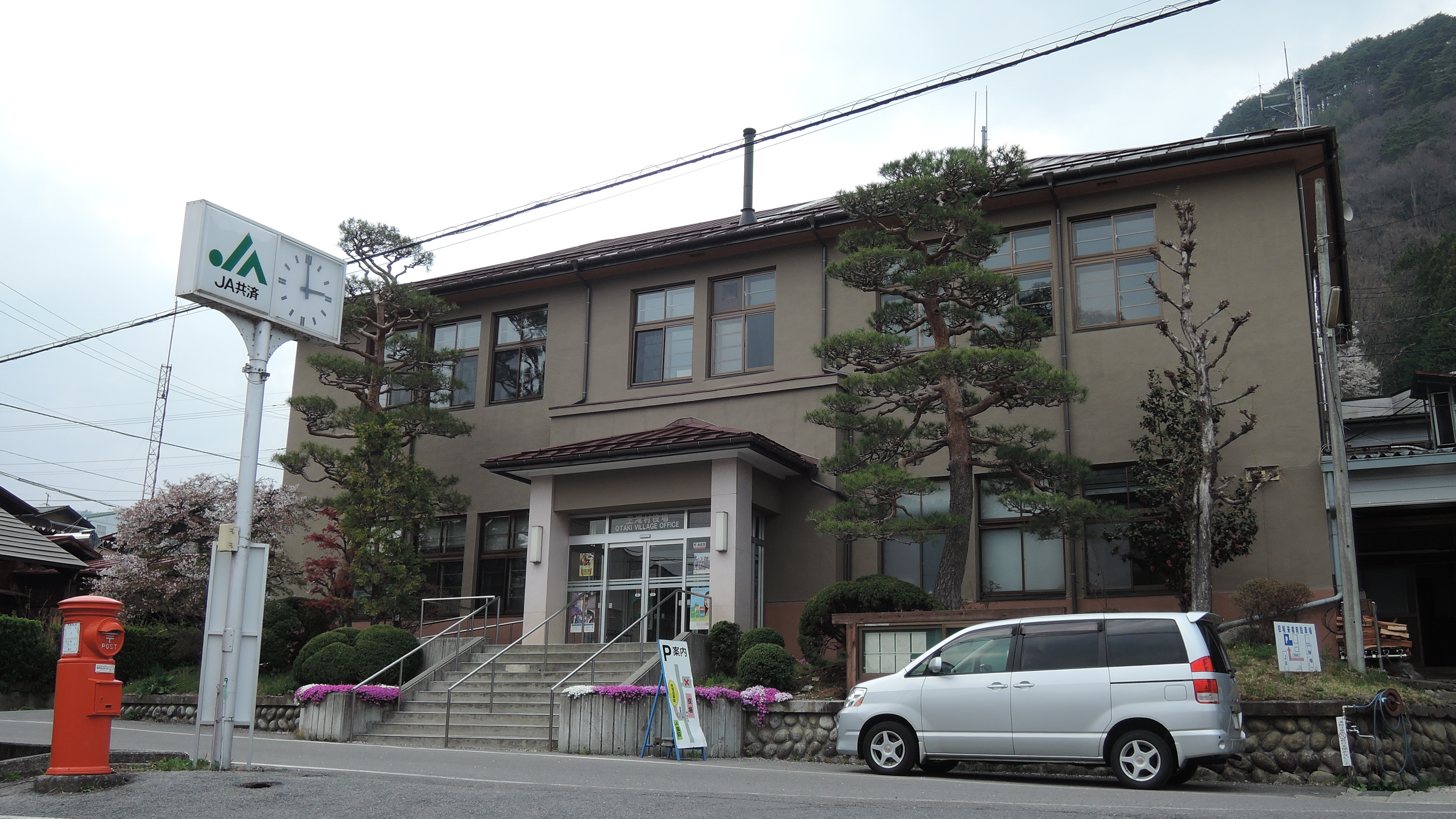
- Ōtaki Village Hall

- Flag Seal

- Location of Ōtaki in Nagano Prefecture

- Coordinates: 35°48′33.6″N 137°33′2.7″E
- Country: Japan
- Region: Chūbu (Kōshin'etsu)
- Prefecture: Nagano
- District: Kiso

Area
  - Total: 310.82 km^{2} (120.01 sq mi)

Population (October 2016)
  - Total: 753
  - Density: 2.42/km^{2} (6.27/sq mi)
- Time zone: UTC+9 (Japan Standard Time)
- Symbols
  - Tree: Chamaecyparis obtusa
  - Flower: Rhododendron subg. Hymenanthes
- Phone number: 0264-48-2001
- Address: 3623 Kamijo, Ōtaki-mura, Kiso-gun, Nagano-ken 397-0201
- Website: Official website

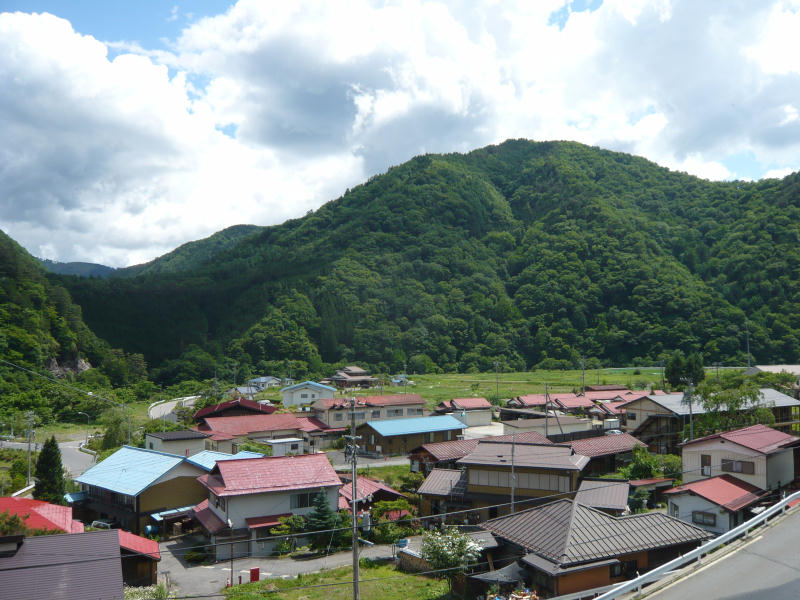
Ōtaki village

Ōtaki (王滝村, Ōtaki-mura) is a village located in Nagano Prefecture, Japan. As of 1 April 2019, the village had an estimated population of 753 in 378 household, and a population density of 2.4 persons per km^{2}. The total area of the village is 310.82 square kilometres (120.01 sq mi). At present, Ōtaki's land area is 95% forestland, 86% of which is designated national forest.

== Geography ==
Ōtaki is located in the Kiso Mountains of southwest Nagano Prefecture, bordered by Gifu Prefecture to the west. Mount Ontake (3067 meters) is on the northern border of the village. Makio Dam is located within the village.

=== Surrounding municipalities ===
- Gifu Prefecture
  - Gero
  - Nakatsugawa
- Nagano Prefecture
  - Agematsu
  - Kiso (town)
  - Ōkuwa

=== Climate ===
The village has a climate characterized by warm and humid summers, and cold winters with very heavy snowfall (Köppen climate classification Dfb). The average annual temperature in Ōtaki is 8.1 °C. The average annual rainfall is 1883 mm with September as the wettest month. The temperatures are highest on average in August, at around 20.95 °C, and lowest in January, at around -4.3 °C.

== Demographics ==
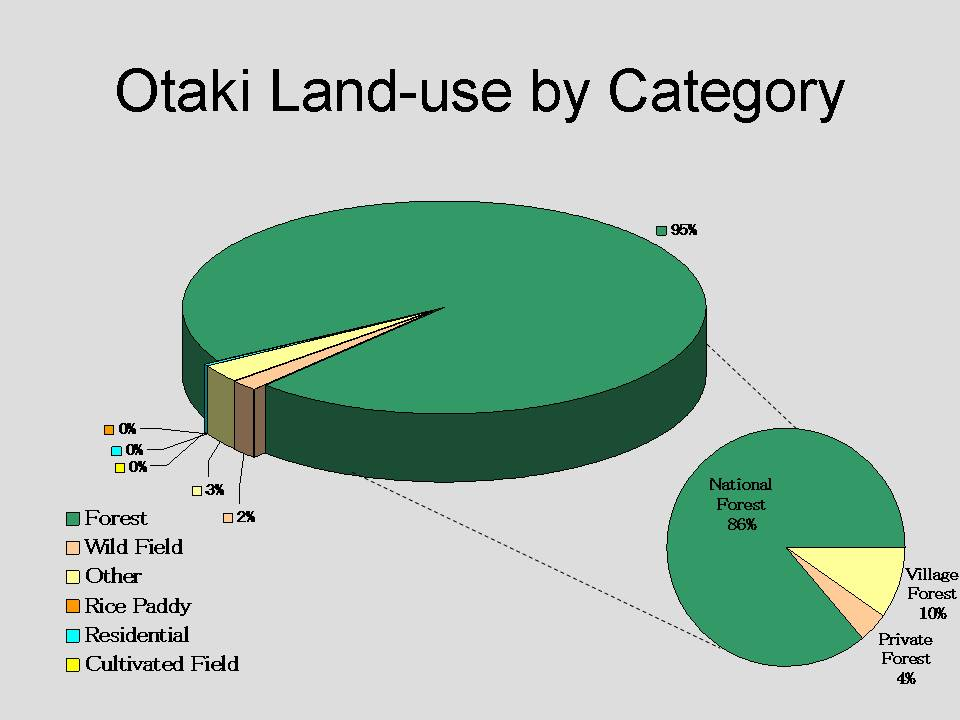
Ōtaki land-use

Demographically, the population structure of Ōtaki is similar to that found in rural areas across Japan; a rising elderly population coupled with a decline in overall population. Per Japanese census data, the population of Ōtaki has declined rapidly over the past 50 years.

Historical population
Year	Pop.	±%
1940	4,409	—
1950	4,283	−2.9%
1960	3,862	−9.8%
1970	2,266	−41.3%
1980	1,768	−22.0%
1990	1,239	−29.9%
2000	1,205	−2.7%
2010	965	−19.9%
2020	715	−25.9%

== History ==
The area of present-day Ōtaki was part of ancient Shinano Province, and the name of Ōtaki appears in a 1504 record as part of the Chikuma region of Shinano. The present village of Ōtaki was incorporated on April 1, 1889, by the establishment of the modern municipalities system.

In 1917, construction began on the Ōtaki Forest Railroad (王滝 森林鉄道) The railroad was discontinued on June 30, 1975. On May 1, 1968, Chikuma District was renamed Kiso District. On September 14, 1984, the 1984 Otaki earthquake caused a section of Mount Ontake to crumble and flow into the Ōtaki Valley, with 29 people reported dead or missing and 87 homes destroyed.

== Economy ==
Though tourism remains the primary industry in Ōtaki, tourist numbers (including skiers and worshipers) have declined in recent years. After tourism, manufacturing jobs are the most prevalent, followed finally by agriculture. Ōtaki is struggling economically, due in large part to public debt accrued through the building and management of Ontake 2240 ski hill. For 2008 roughly 3/4 of Ōtaki's annual budget is slated for administrative and financial operations, with almost a quarter of this being used to pay back public debt. This leaves only a fraction of funds for use in providing basic services such as sanitation, health, and education. Major cuts have been made to the salaries of village employees and to money spent social, cultural, and educational activities.

== Education ==
Ōtaki has one public elementary school and one public middle school operated by the town government. The village does not have a high school.

== Transportation ==
=== Railway ===
- The village does not have any passenger railway service.

=== Highway ===
- The village is not located on any national highway
