= Mitake, Nagano =

Former village in Nagano Prefecture, Japan

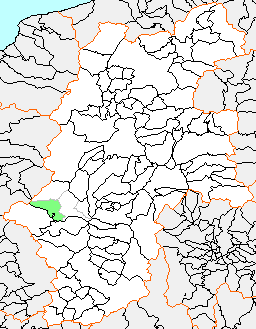
Map of Mitake, Nagano

Mitake (三岳村, Mitake-mura) was a village located in Kiso District, Nagano Prefecture, Japan.

As of 2003, the village had an estimated population of 1,930 and a density of 16.09 persons per km^{2}. The total area was 119.92 km^{2}.

On November 1, 2005, Mitake, along with the town of Kisofukushima, and the villages of Hiyoshi and Kaida (all from Kiso District), was merged to create the town of Kiso.
