= Yamagata, Nagano =

Yamagata 山形村
- Village
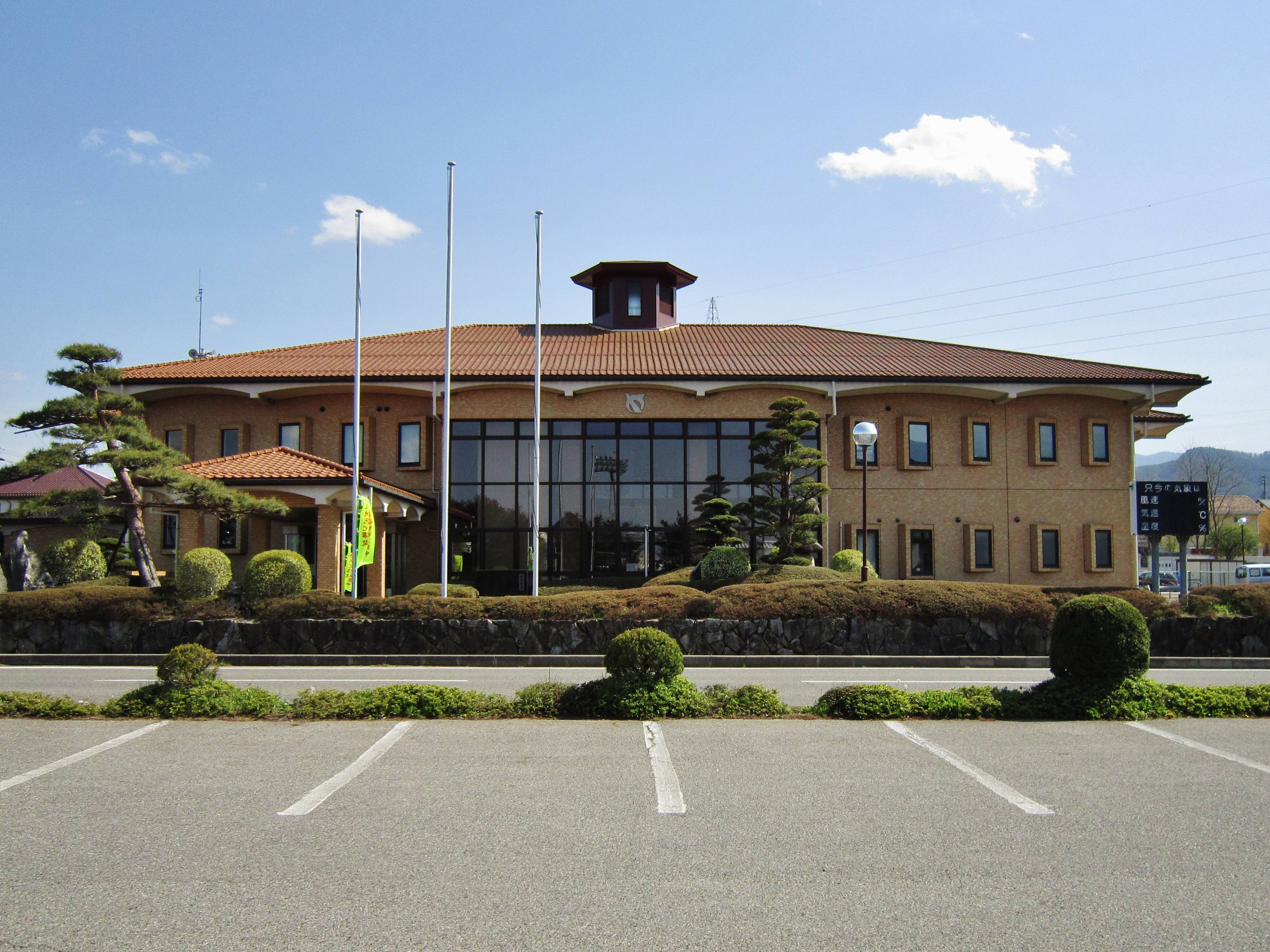
- Yamagata Village Hall

- Flag Seal

- Location of Yamagata in Nagano Prefecture

- Coordinates: 36°10′4.9″N 137°52′43.9″E
- Country: Japan
- Region: Chūbu (Kōshin'etsu)
- Prefecture: Nagano
- District: Higashichikuma

Area
  - Total: 24.98 km^{2} (9.64 sq mi)

Population (April 2019)
  - Total: 8,726
  - Density: 349.3/km^{2} (904.7/sq mi)
- Time zone: UTC+9 (Japan Standard Time)
- Symbols
  - Tree: Taxus cuspidata
  - Flower: Rhododendron indicum
- Phone number: 0263-98-3111
- Address: 2030-1, Yamagata-mura, Higashichikuma-gun, Nagano-ken 390-1392
- Website: Official website

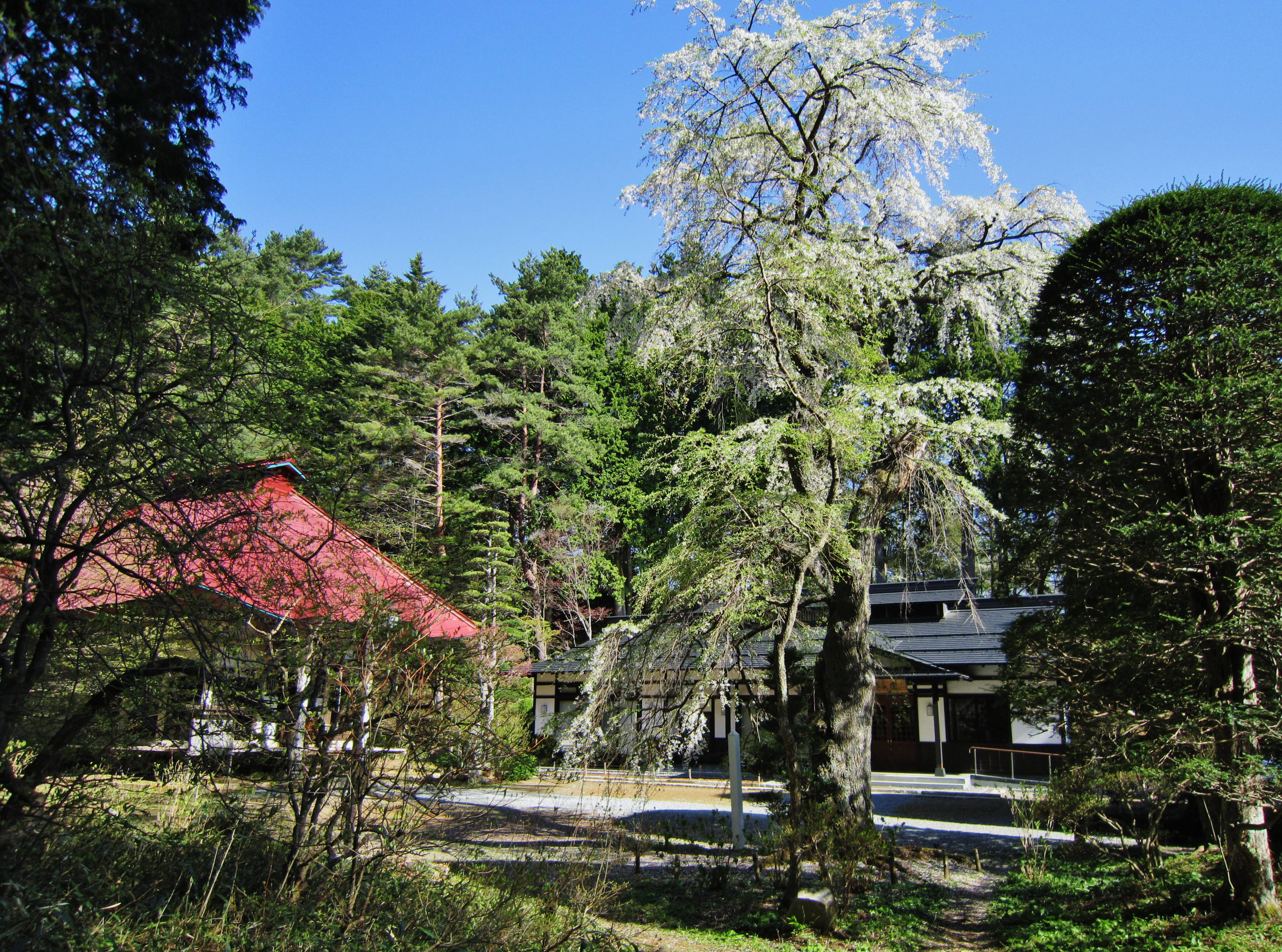
Nagano Kiyomizu-dera

Yamagata (山形村, Yamagata-mura) is a village located in Nagano Prefecture, Japan. As of 1 October 2016, the village had an estimated population of 8,726 in 3071 households, and a population density of 333 persons per km^{2}. The total area of the village is 24.98 square kilometres (9.64 sq mi).

== Geography ==
Yamagata is located in the centre of Nagano Prefecture in the Matsumoto Basin at an altitude of approximately 700 meters. Mount Hachimori (2447 meters) is partially within the borders of the village.

=== Surrounding municipalities ===
- Nagano Prefecture
  - Asahi
  - Matsumoto

=== Climate ===
The village has a climate characterized by characterized by hot and humid summers, and cold winters (Köppen climate classification Cfa. The average annual temperature in Yamagata is 11.4 °C. The average annual rainfall is 1152 mm with September as the wettest month. The temperatures are highest on average in August, at around 24.6 °C, and lowest in January, at around -1.0 °C.

== Demographics ==
Per Japanese census data, the population of Yamagata has recently plateaued after several decades of growth.

Historical population
Year	Pop.	±%
1940	5,051	—
1950	6,337	+25.5%
1960	5,567	−12.2%
1970	4,991	−10.3%
1980	5,578	+11.8%
1990	6,513	+16.8%
2000	7,706	+18.3%
2010	8,424	+9.3%
2020	8,400	−0.3%

== History ==
The area of present-day Yamagata was part of ancient Shinano Province. The area was part of the holdings of Matsumoto Domain during the Edo period. The village of Yamagata was established on April 1, 1889 by the establishment of the modern municipalities system and has not changed its borders since that time.

== Economy ==
The economy of the village is based on agriculture.

== Education ==
Yamagata has one public elementary school and one public middle school shared with the neighboring village of Asahi. The village does not have a high school.

== Transportation ==
=== Railway ===
The village does not have any passenger railway service.

=== Highway ===
The village is not located on any national highway.

== Sister city relationship ==
- Ōmi, Niigata — a former town located in Nishikubiki District, Niigata, Japan.
