= Hiyoshi, Nagano =

Former village in Nagano Prefecture, Japan

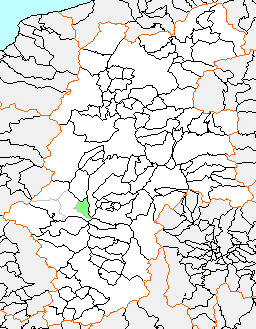
Map of Hiyoshi, Nagano

Hiyoshi (日義村, Hiyoshi-mura) was a village located in Kiso District, Nagano Prefecture, Japan.

As of 2003, the village had an estimated population of 2,692 and a density of 47.54 persons per km^{2}. The total area was 56.63 km^{2}.

On November 1, 2005, Hiyoshi, along with the town of Kisofukushima, and the villages of Kaida and Mitake (all from Kiso District), was merged to create the town of Kiso.
