= Miyanokoshi Station =

Railway station in Kiso, Nagano Prefecture, Japan

Miyanokoshi Station 宮ノ越駅
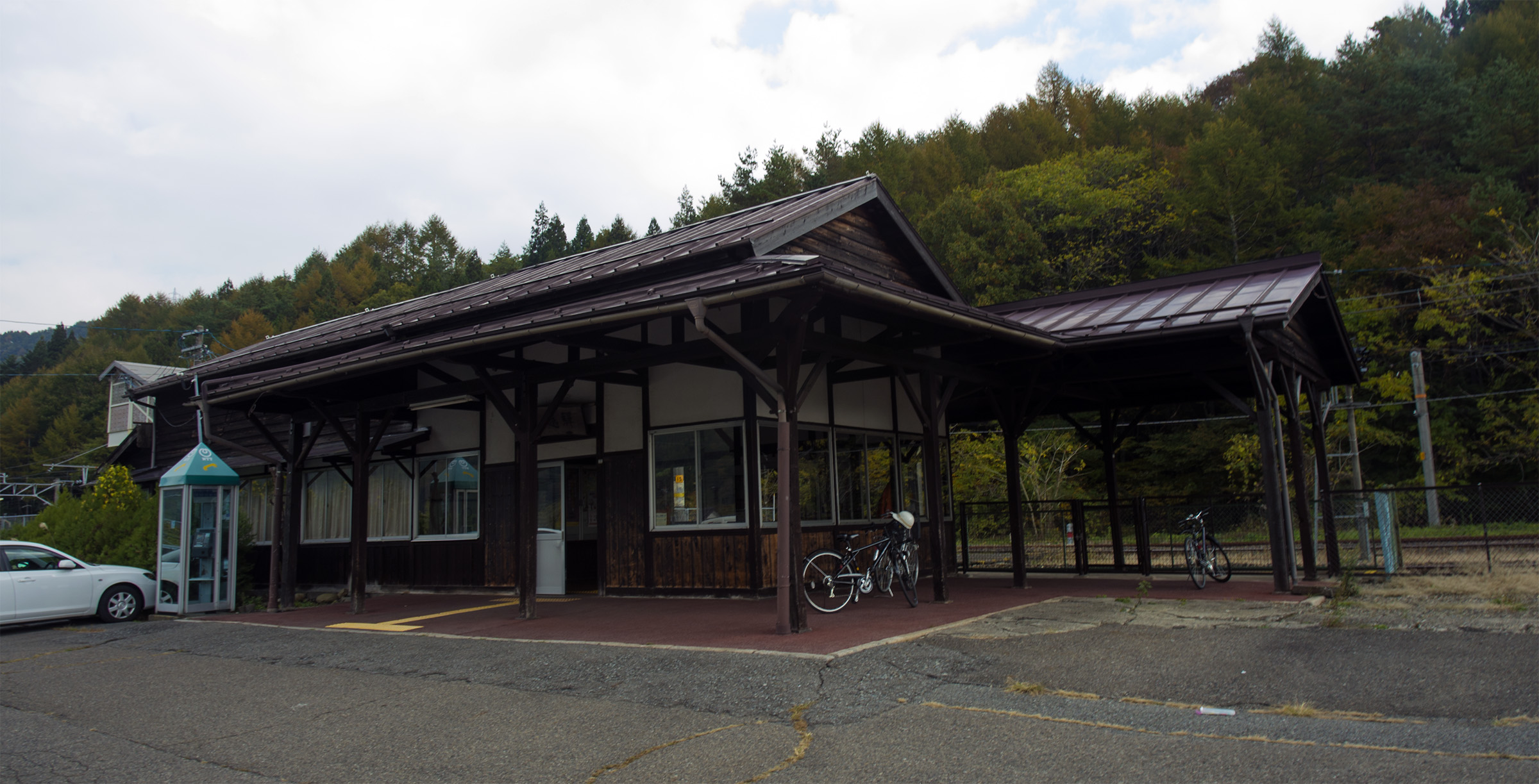
- Miyanokoshi Station, November 2013

General information
- Location: Hiyoshi, Kiso-machi, Kiso-gun, Nagano-ken 399-6101; Japan
- Coordinates: 35.8879°N 137.7641°E
- Elevation: 859.6 meters
- Operator: JR Central
- Line: Chūō Main Line
- Distance: 255.5 km from Tokyo
- Platforms: 1 island platform
- Tracks: 2

Other information
- Status: Unstaffed

History
- Opened: 25 December 1910; 115 years ago

Passengers
- FY2015: 40 daily
Location
- Location within Nagano Prefecture Location within Japan

Miyanokoshi Station (宮ノ越駅, Miyanokoshi-eki) is a railway station in the town of Kiso, Nagano Prefecture, Japan, operated by Central Japan Railway Company (JR Tōkai).

== Lines ==
Miyanokoshi Station is served by the JR Tōkai Chūō Main Line, and is located 255.5 kilometers from the official starting point of the line at Tokyo and 141.4 kilometers from Nagoya.

== Layout ==
The station has one island platform connected by a footbridge. The station is unattended.

=== Platforms ===
| 1 | ■ Chūō Main Line | For Shiojiri and Nagano |
| 2 | ■ Chūō Main Line | For Nakatsugawa and Nagoya |

== Adjacent stations ==
| ← | Service | → |
JR Central Chūō Main Line
| Yabuhara | Local | Harano |

== History ==
Miyanokoshi Station was opened on 25 November 1910. On 1 April 1987, it became part of JR Tōkai.

== Passenger statistics ==
In fiscal 2015, the station was used by an average of 40 passengers daily (boarding passengers only).

== Surrounding area ==
- Kiso River
- Miyanokoshi-juku
- National Route 19

== See also ==
- List of railway stations in Japan
