= Japan National Route 360 =

Road in Japan

National Route 360
- 国道360号
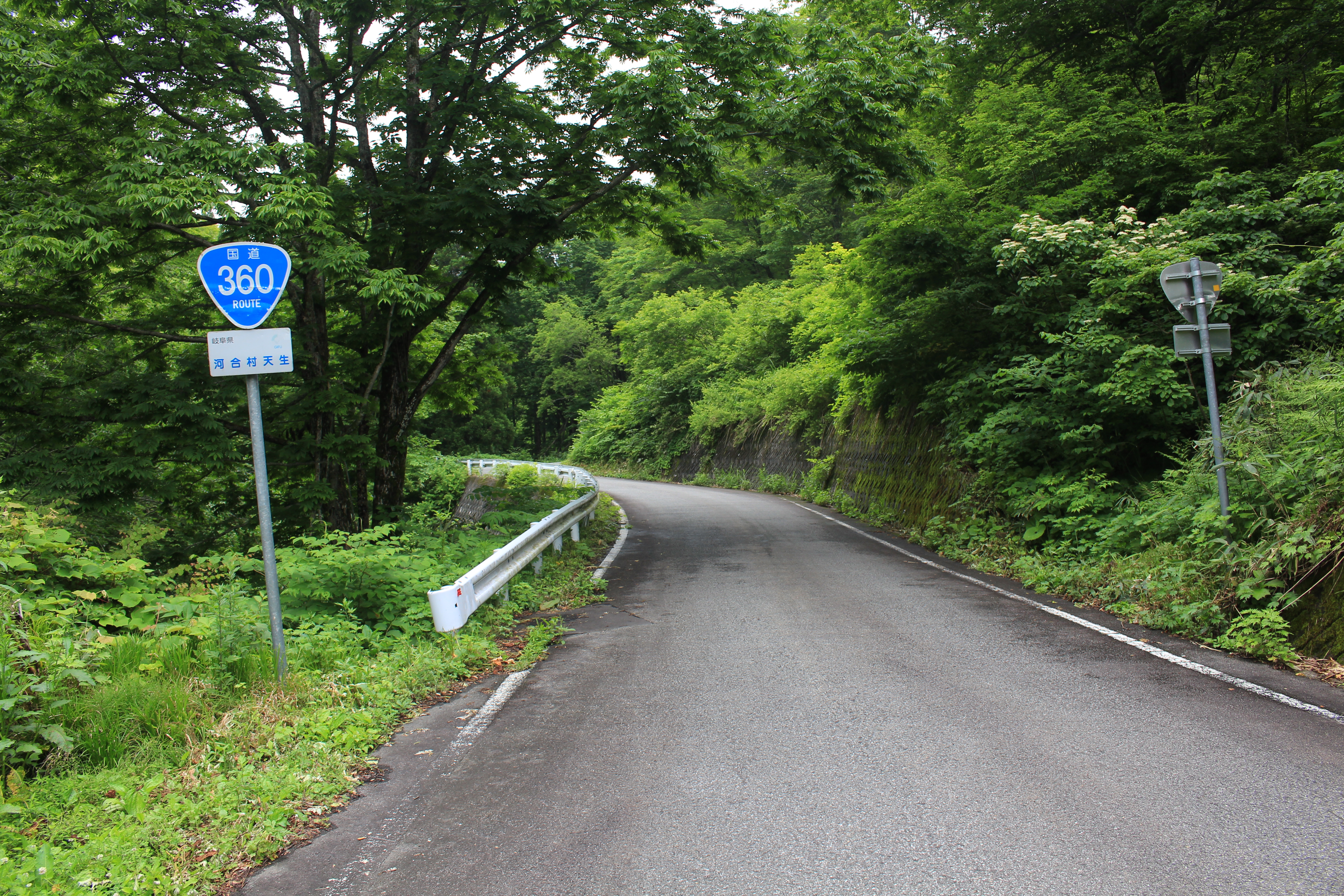

Route information
- Length: 128.3 km (79.7 mi)

Location
- Country: Japan

Highway system
- National highways of Japan; Expressways of Japan
← National Route 359	→ National Route 361

National Route 360 is a national highway of Japan connecting Toyama, Toyama and Komatsu, Ishikawa in Japan, with a total length of 128.3 km (79.7 mi).
