= Kisofukushima, Nagano =

Former town in Nagano Prefecture, Japan

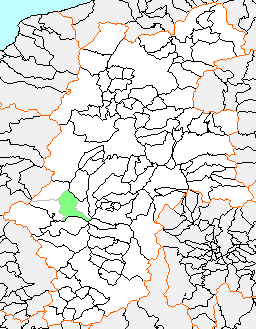
Map of Kisofukushima, Nagano

Kisofukushima (木曽福島町, Kisofukushima-machi) was a town located in Kiso District, Nagano Prefecture, Japan.

As of 2003, the town had an estimated population of 7,971 and a density of 53.15 persons per km^{2}. The total area was 149.97 km^{2}.

On November 1, 2005, Kisofukushima, along with the villages of Hiyoshi, Kaida and Mitake (all from Kiso District), was merged to create the town of Kiso.
