= Kisobushi =

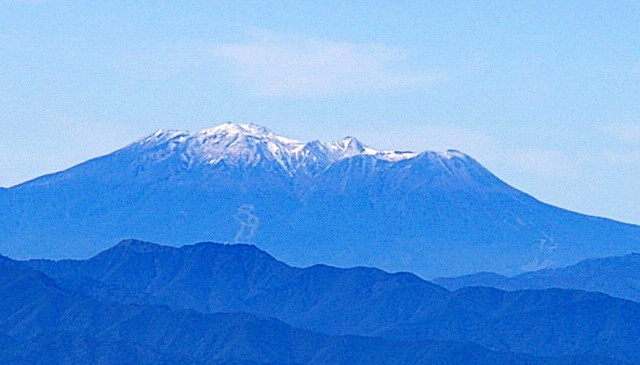
Mount Ontake

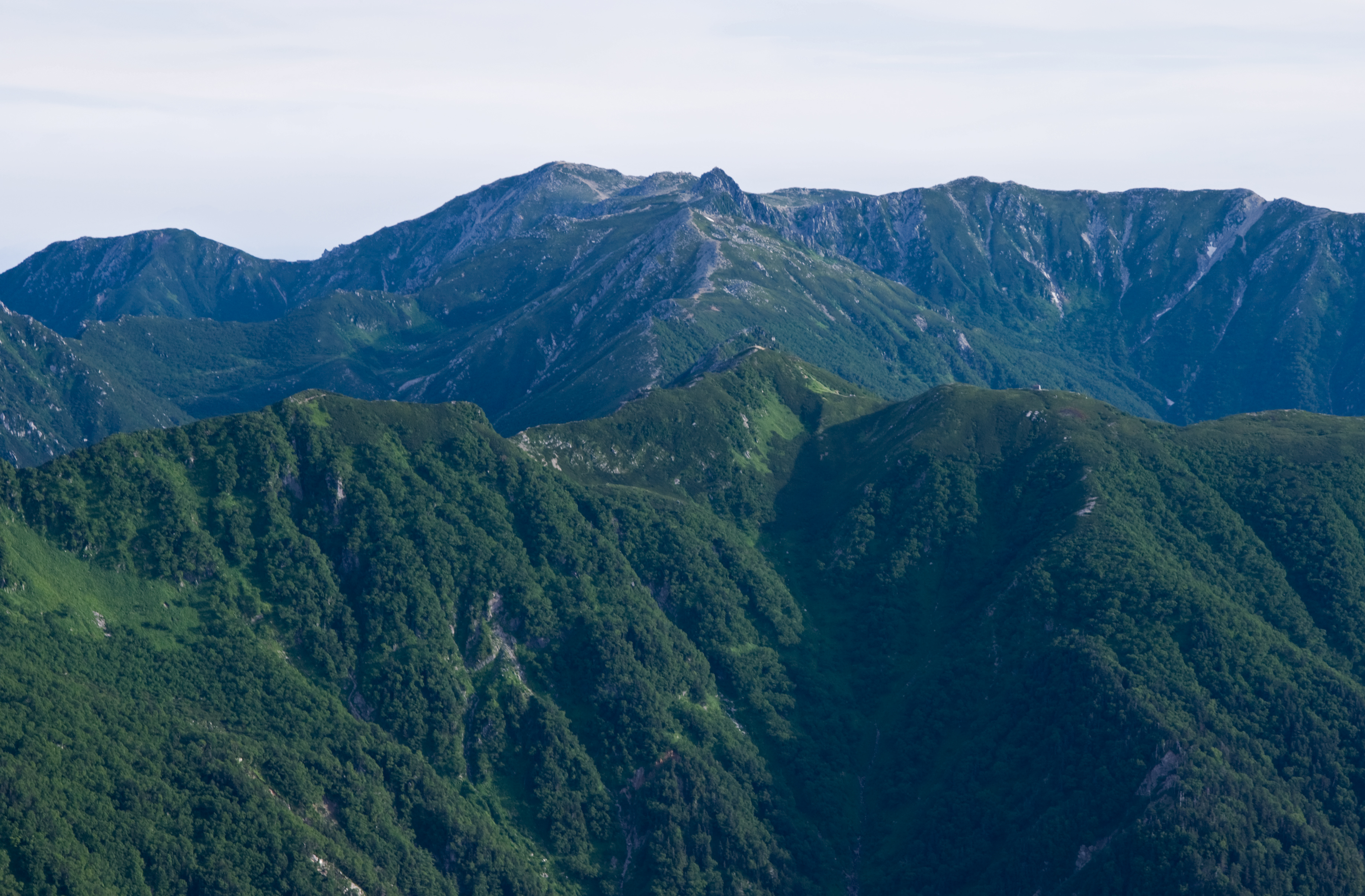
Mount Kisokoma

Kisobushi (in Japanese: 木曽節) is a folk song originating from the Kiso District of Nagano Prefecture, Japan. It sings about the river, mountains and people who live there.

== General ==
Kisobushi is a folk song originating from the Kiso District of Nagano Prefecture, Japan. It sings about the river, mountains and people who live there. "Fushi" (in Japanese: 節) or "Bushi", when immediately follows another nouns, as in "Tankobushi", means a melody or a song.

== Lyrics ==
There are several stanzas of various versions. The words, "Nakanori san", in the lyrics are generally agreed to mean the loggers who raft down the Kiso River, carrying the logs cut down from the woods in the Kiso Mountains.

=== Japanese original ===
木曽のナー 中乗りさん
木曽の御岳（おんたけ）さんは ナンジャラホーイ
夏でも寒い ヨイヨイヨイ
合唱：ヨイヨイヨイノ ヨイヨイヨイ

袷ょ（あわしょ）ナー 中乗りさん
あわしょやりたや ナンジャラホーイ
足袋もそえて ヨイヨイヨイ
合唱：ハー ヨイヨイヨイノ ヨイヨイヨイ

...

=== Romanized Japanese ===
Kiso no nah, Nakanori san,
Kisono Ontakesan wa, nanjara hoi!
Natsu demo samui, yoi yoi yoi!
Chorus: Hah, yoi yoi yoi no, yoi yoi yoi!

Awasho nah, Nakanori san,
Awasho yaritaya, nanjara hoi!
Tabi mo soete, yoi yoi yoi!
Chorus: Hah, yoi yoi yoi no, yoi yoi yoi!

...

== See also ==
- Nagano Prefecture
- Kiso District, Nagano
- Kiso Mountains
- Kiso River
