= Kaida, Nagano =

Former village in Nagano Prefecture, Japan

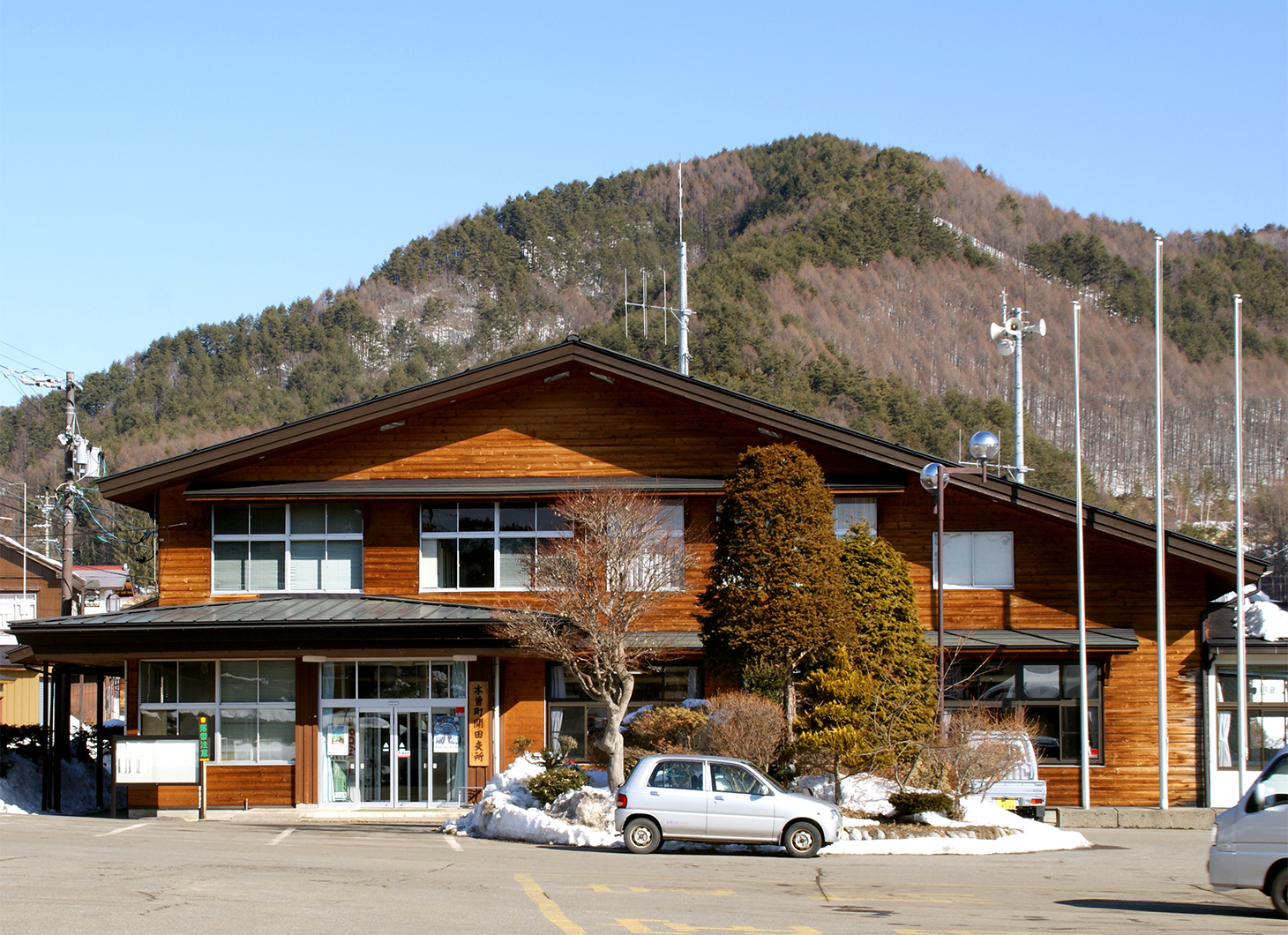
former Kaida village hall

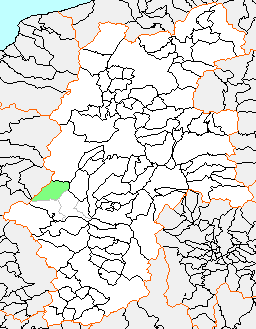
Map of Kaida, Nagano

Kaida (開田村, Kaida-mura) was a village located in Kiso District, Nagano Prefecture, Japan.

As of 2003, the village had an estimated population of 2,026 and a density of 13.55 persons per km^{2}. The total area was 149.54 km^{2}.

On November 1, 2005, Kaida, along with the town of Kisofukushima, and the villages of Hiyoshi and Mitake (all from Kiso District), was merged to create the town of Kiso.
