= Harano Station =

Railway station in Kiso, Nagano Prefecture, Japan

Harano Station 原野駅
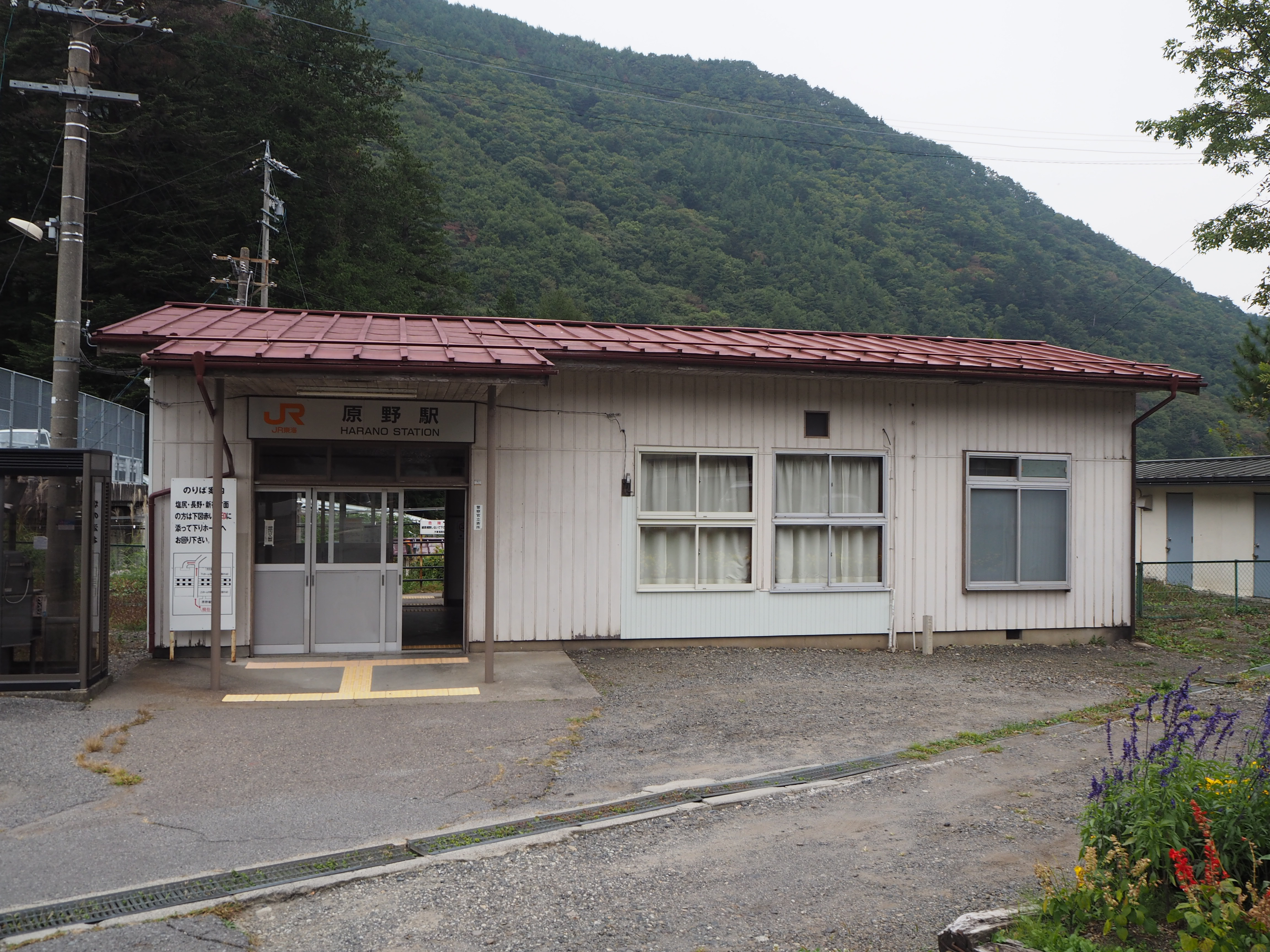
- Harano Station in October 2010

General information
- Location: Hiyoshi, Kiso-machi, Kiso-gun, Nagano-ken 399-6101; Japan
- Coordinates: 35.8718°N 137.7419°E
- Elevation: 837.3 meters
- Operator: JR Central
- Line: Chūō Main Line
- Distance: 258.3 km from Tokyo
- Platforms: 2 side platforms
- Tracks: 2

Other information
- Status: Unstaffed

History
- Opened: 21 April 1955; 71 years ago

Passengers
- FY2015: 63 daily
Location
- Location within Nagano Prefecture Location within Japan

Harano Station (原野駅, Harano-eki) is a railway station in the town of Kiso, Nagano Prefecture, Japan, operated by Central Japan Railway Company (JR Tōkai).

== Lines ==
Harano Station is served by the JR Tōkai Chūō Main Line, and is located 258.3 kilometers from the official starting point of the line at Tokyo and 138.6 kilometers from Nagoya.

== Layout ==
The station has two ground level side platforms. The platforms are not connected within the station, and passengers wishing to change platforms must first exit the station, and use a public overpass to cross the tracks, and re-enter the station from the other side. The station is unattended.

=== Platforms ===
1	■ Chūō Main Line	For Nakatsugawa and Nagoya
2	■ Chūō Main Line	For Shiojiri and Nagano

== Adjacent stations ==
←	Service	→
JR Central Chūō Main Line
Miyanokoshi	Local	Kiso-Fukushima

== History ==
Harano Station was opened on 21 April 1955. On 1 April 1987, it became part of JR Tōkai.

== Passenger statistics ==
In fiscal 2015, the station was used by an average of 63 passengers daily (boarding passengers only).

== Surrounding area ==
- Harano Hachiman-gu
- Harano Forestry Center
- National Route 19

== See also ==
- List of railway stations in Japan
