= Japan National Route 361 =

Road in Japan

National Route 361
- 国道361号
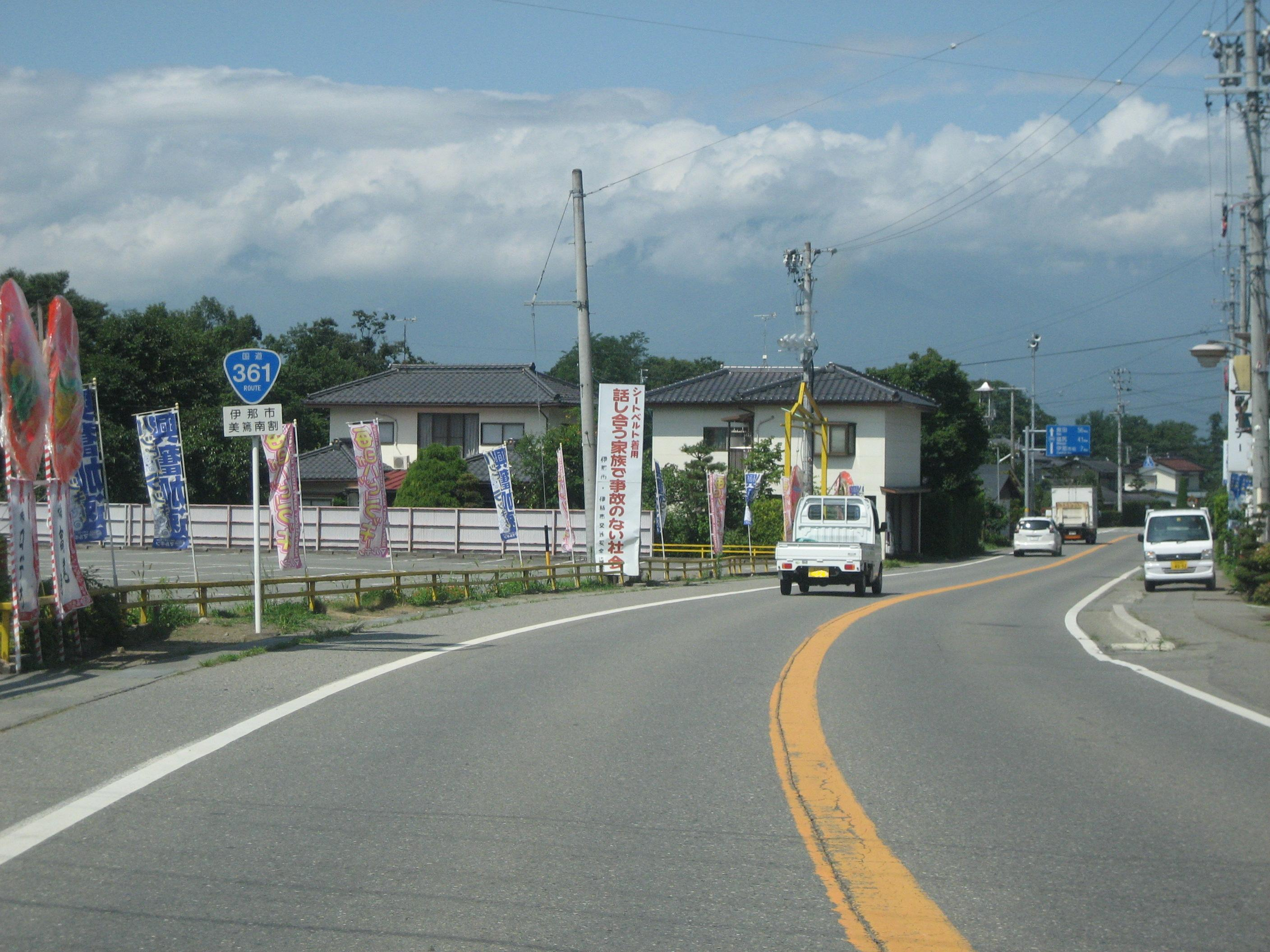

Route information
- Length: 131.7 km (81.8 mi)

Location
- Country: Japan

Highway system
- National highways of Japan; Expressways of Japan
| ← National Route 360 | → National Route 362 |

National Route 361 is a national highway of Japan connecting Takayama, Gifu and Ina, Nagano in Japan, with a total length of 131.7 km (81.8 mi).
