= Kiso, Nagano (village) =

Kiso 木祖村
- Village
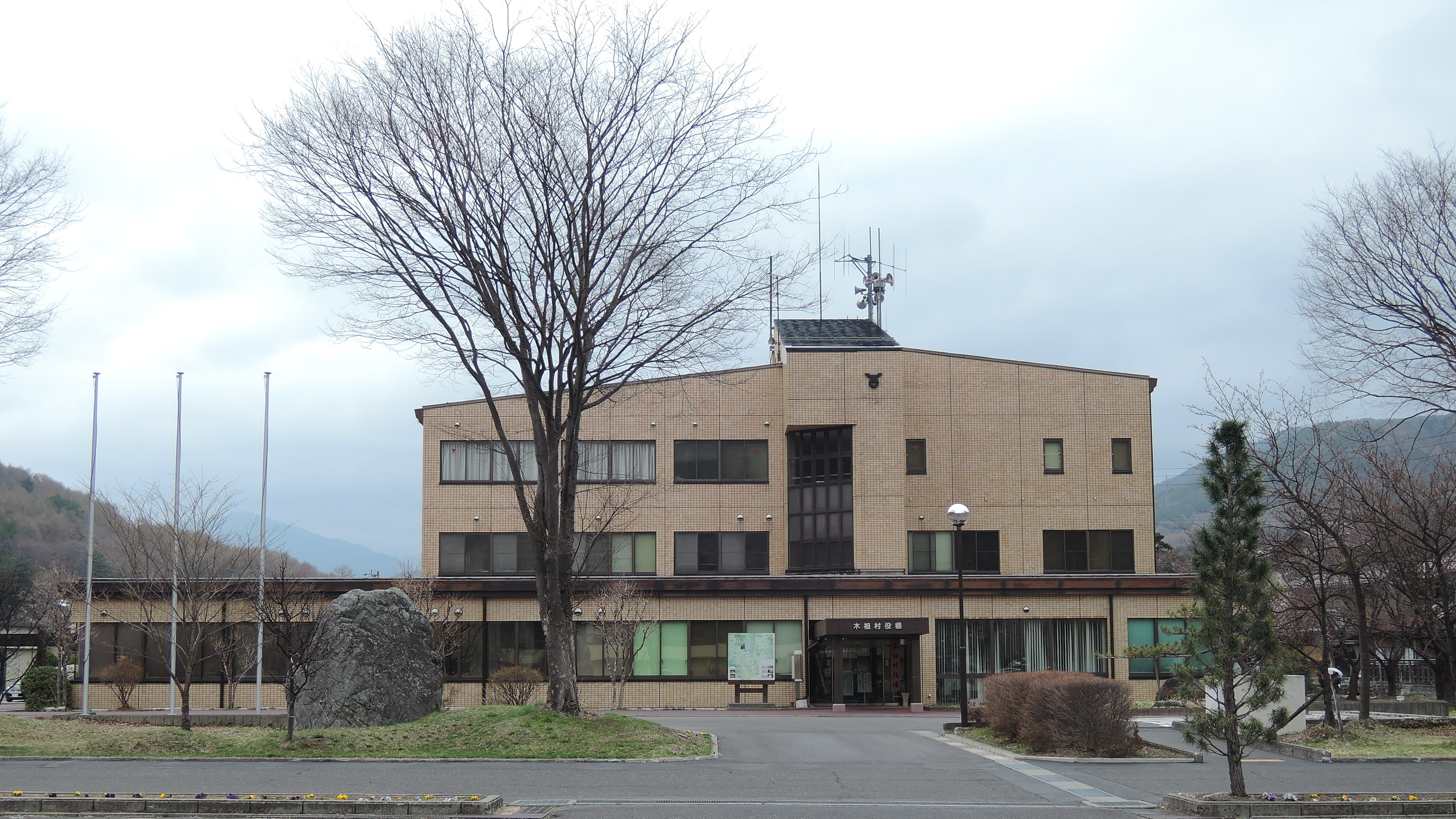
- Kiso Village Hall

- Flag Seal

- Location of Kiso Village in Nagano Prefecture

- Coordinates: 35°56′10.7″N 137°46′59.3″E
- Country: Japan
- Region: Chūbu (Kōshin'etsu)
- Prefecture: Nagano
- District: Kiso

Area
  - Total: 140.50 km^{2} (54.25 sq mi)

Population (April 2019)
  - Total: 2,877
  - Density: 20.48/km^{2} (53.03/sq mi)
- Time zone: UTC+9 (Japan Standard Time)
- Symbols
  - Tree: Aesculus turbinata
  - Flower: Gentiana scabra
- Phone number: 0264-36-2001
- Address: 1191 Yabuhara, Kiso-mura, Kiso-gun, Nagano-ken 399-6201
- Website: Official website

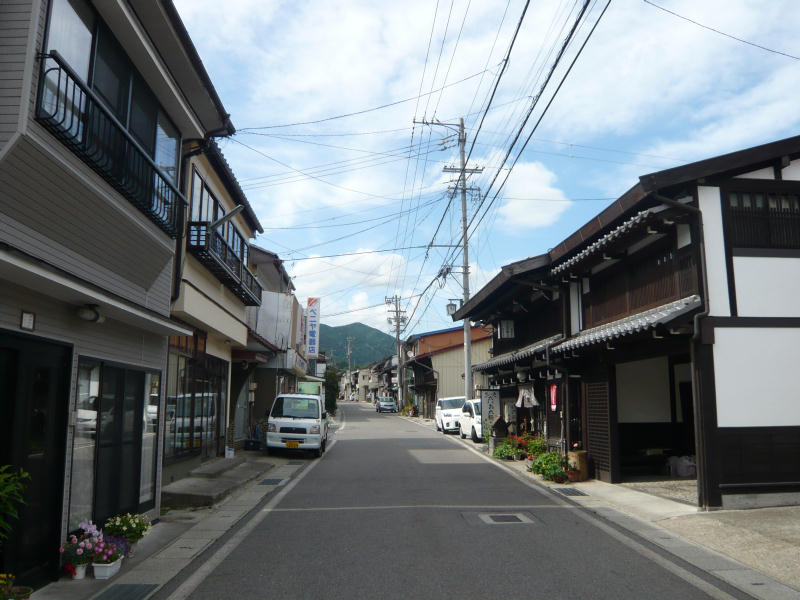
Yabuhara-juku in Kiso Village

Kiso (木祖村, Kiso-mura) is a village located in Nagano Prefecture, Japan. As of 1 April 2019, the village had an estimated population of 2,877 in 1116 households, and a population density of 20 persons per km^{2}. The total area of the village is 140.50 square kilometres (54.25 sq mi).

== Geography ==
Kiso is located in west-central Nagano Prefecture, in the valley of the Kiso River.

=== Surrounding municipalities ===
- Nagano Prefecture
  - Asahi
  - Kiso (town)
  - Matsumoto
  - Shiojiri

=== Climate ===
The village has a climate characterized by characterized by cool and humid summers, and cold winters with heavy snowfall (Köppen climate classification Dfb). The average annual temperature in Iijima is 5.7 °C. The average annual rainfall is 1860 mm with September as the wettest month. The temperatures are highest on average in August, at around 18.6 °C, and lowest in January, at around -6.7 °C.

Climate data for Kiso Village, Nagano
| Month | Jan | Feb | Mar | Apr | May | Jun | Jul | Aug | Sep | Oct | Nov | Dec | Year |
|---|---|---|---|---|---|---|---|---|---|---|---|---|---|
| Mean daily maximum °C (°F) | 1.4 (34.5) | 2.3 (36.1) | 6.7 (44.1) | 14.9 (58.8) | 20.3 (68.5) | 23.3 (73.9) | 26.6 (79.9) | 28.2 (82.8) | 23.2 (73.8) | 17.3 (63.1) | 11.3 (52.3) | 4.9 (40.8) | 15.1 (59.2) |
| Daily mean °C (°F) | −2.9 (26.8) | −2.5 (27.5) | 1.1 (34.0) | 8.0 (46.4) | 13.6 (56.5) | 17.6 (63.7) | 21.1 (70.0) | 22.2 (72.0) | 17.9 (64.2) | 11.3 (52.3) | 5.4 (41.7) | 0.1 (32.2) | 9.4 (48.9) |
| Mean daily minimum °C (°F) | −7.6 (18.3) | −7.5 (18.5) | −3.9 (25.0) | 1.9 (35.4) | 7.8 (46.0) | 12.9 (55.2) | 17.0 (62.6) | 17.8 (64.0) | 13.7 (56.7) | 6.6 (43.9) | 0.6 (33.1) | −4.3 (24.3) | 4.6 (40.3) |
| Average precipitation mm (inches) | 80.3 (3.16) | 81.6 (3.21) | 98.5 (3.88) | 95.3 (3.75) | 121.2 (4.77) | 165.5 (6.52) | 195.8 (7.71) | 134.2 (5.28) | 168.4 (6.63) | 109.8 (4.32) | 76.4 (3.01) | 70.3 (2.77) | 1,397.1 (55.00) |
| Average snowfall cm (inches) | 180 (71) | 147 (58) | 91 (36) | 8 (3.1) | 0 (0) | 0 (0) | 0 (0) | 0 (0) | 0 (0) | 1 (0.4) | 9 (3.5) | 89 (35) | 525 (207) |
Source: Japan Meteorological Agency

== Demographics ==
Per Japanese census data, the population of Kiso has decreased over the past 30 years.

Historical population
| Year | Pop. | ±% |
|---|---|---|
| 1940 | 4,362 | — |
| 1950 | 5,010 | +14.9% |
| 1960 | 4,899 | −2.2% |
| 1970 | 4,375 | −10.7% |
| 1980 | 4,190 | −4.2% |
| 1990 | 4,300 | +2.6% |
| 2000 | 3,596 | −16.4% |
| 2010 | 3,135 | −12.8% |
| 2020 | 2,692 | −14.1% |

== History ==
Kiso village is located in former Shinano Province. The area developed as Yabuhara-juku, a post station on the Nakasendō highway connecting Edo with Kyoto during the Edo period. The present village of Kiso was established on April 1, 1889 by the establishment of the modern municipalities system.

== Transportation ==
=== Railway ===
- JR Tōkai – Chūō Main Line
  - Yabuhara

=== Highway ===
- National Route 19
