= Asahi, Nagano =

Asahi 朝日村
- Village
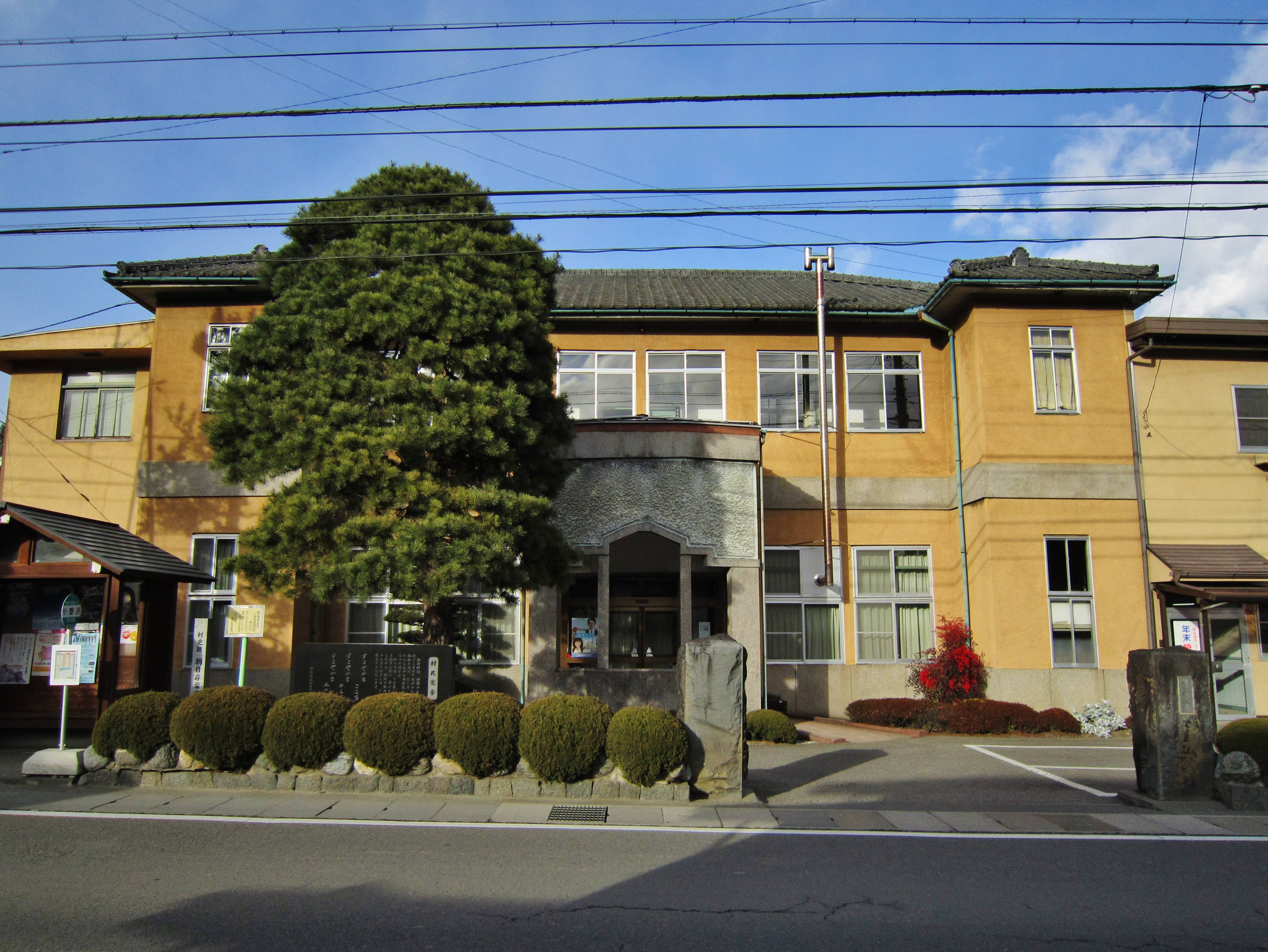
- Asahi Village Hall

- Flag Seal

- Location of Asahi in Nagano Prefecture

- Coordinates: 36°7′24.8″N 137°51′58.4″E
- Country: Japan
- Region: Chūbu (Kōshin'etsu)
- Prefecture: Nagano
- District: Higashichikuma

Government
  - Mayor: Hiroyuki Kobayashi (May 2019)

Area
  - Total: 70.62 km^{2} (27.27 sq mi)

Population (April 2019)
  - Total: 4,569
  - Density: 64.70/km^{2} (167.6/sq mi)
- Time zone: UTC+9 (Japan Standard Time)
- Symbols
  - Tree: Japanese red pine
  - Flower: Erythronium japonicum
- Phone number: 0263-99-2001
- Address: Onozawa 296-5, Asahi-mura, Higashichikuma-gun, Nagano-ken 390-1188
- Website: Official website

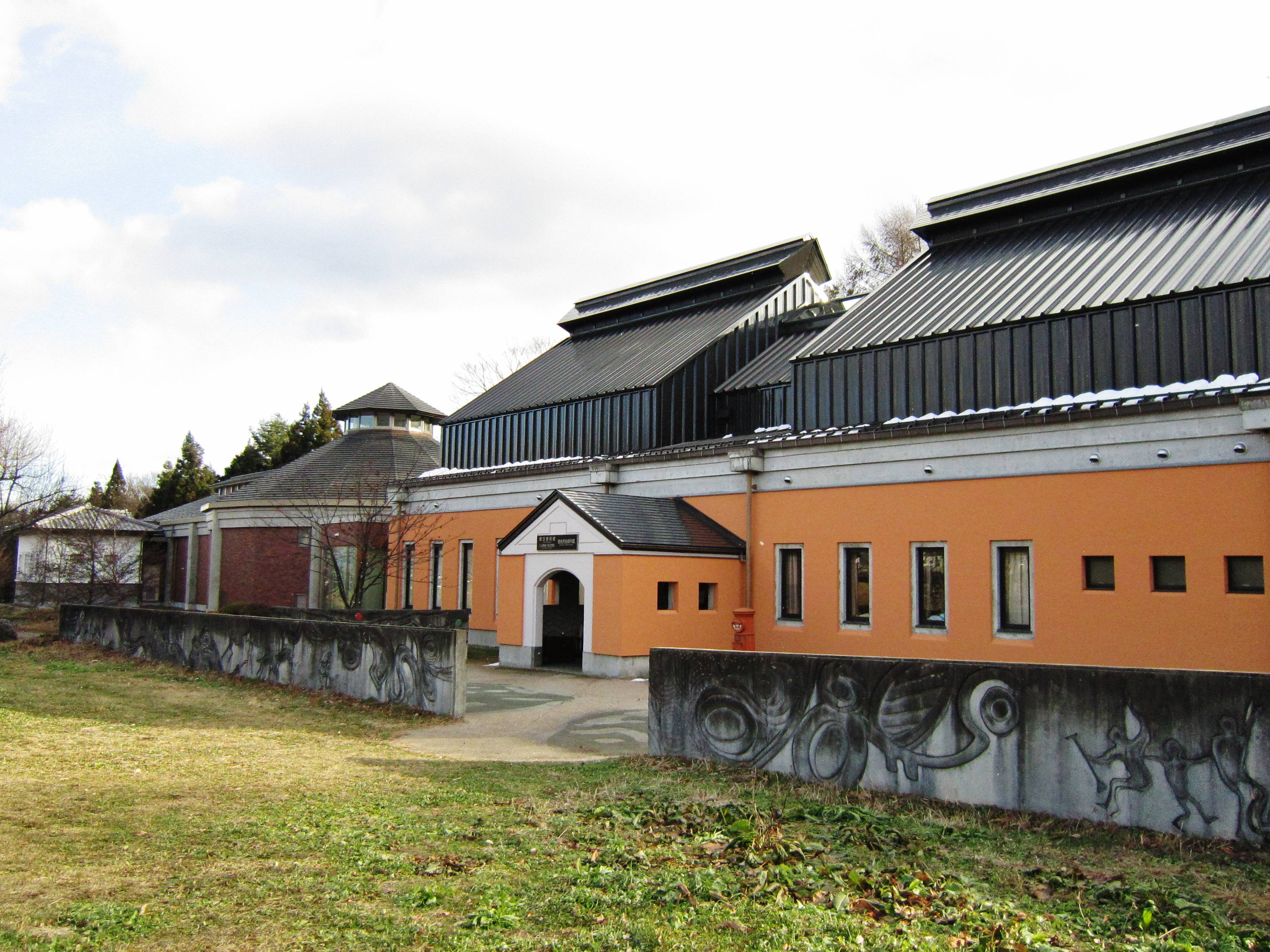
Asahi Village Museum

Asahi (朝日村, Asahi-mura) is a village located in Nagano Prefecture, Japan. As of 1 April 2019, the village had an estimated population of 4,569 in 1533 households, and a population density of 63.4 persons per km². The total area of the village is 70.62 square kilometres (27.27 sq mi).

== Geography ==
Nagawa is located in the centre of Nagano Prefecture within the Matsumoto Basin. Mount Hachimori (2446 meters) is the highest elevation in the village. The Shin-Shinano Frequency Converter Station is located in Asahi.

=== Climate ===
The village has a climate characterized by characterized by cool humid summers, and cold winters with heavy snowfall (Köppen climate classification Dfb). The average annual temperature in Asahi is 7.1 °C. The average annual rainfall is 2151 mm with July as the wettest month. The temperatures are highest on average in August, at around 20.1 °C, and lowest in January, at around −6.7 °C.

=== Surrounding municipalities ===
- Nagano Prefecture
  - Kiso
  - Matsumoto
  - Shiojiri
  - Yamagata

== History ==
The area of present-day Nagawa was part of ancient Shinano Province. Most of the area was part of the holdings of Matsumoto Domain, with a portion held by Takatō Domain during the Edo period. The village of Asahi was established on April 1, 1889 by the establishment of the modern municipalities system.

== Demographics ==
Per Japanese census data, the population of Asahi has remained relatively stable over the past 80 years.

Historical population
Year	Pop.	±%
1940	4,163	—
1950	5,253	+26.2%
1960	4,786	−8.9%
1970	4,332	−9.5%
1980	4,228	−2.4%
1990	4,381	+3.6%
2000	4,908	+12.0%
2010	4,741	−3.4%
2020	4,279	−9.7%

== Education ==
Asahi has one public elementary school and one public middle school operated jointly between Asahi and neighboring Yamagata village. The village does not have a high school.

== Transportation ==
=== Railway ===
The village does not have any passenger railway service.

=== Highway ===
The village is not located on any national highway.
