= Makio Dam =

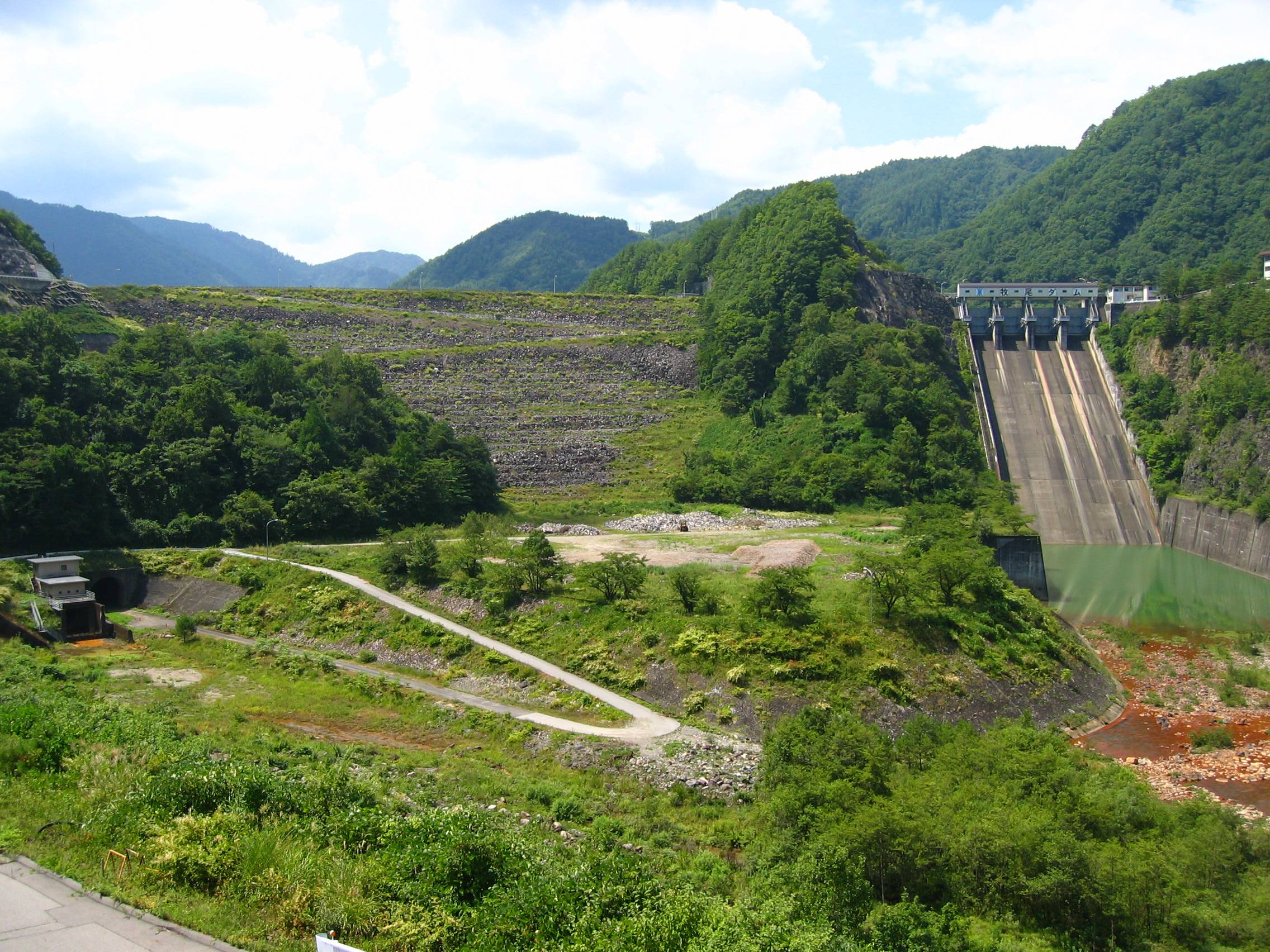
- Interactive map of Makio Dam
- Official name: 牧尾ダム
- Location: Nagano Prefecture, Japan
- Coordinates: 35°49′27″N 137°36′10″E
- Purpose: Irrigation, power generation
- Construction began: 1957
- Opening date: 1961; 65 years ago

Dam and spillways
- Type of dam: Earth fill dam
- Impounds: Otaki River, Kiso River
- Height: 104.5 m (343 ft)
- Length: 260 m (850 ft)
- Dam volume: 2,616,000 m³ (3,421,599 yd³)

Reservoir
- Creates: Lake Mitake
- Catchment area: 304 km² (117.4 mi²)

Power Station
- Operator: Kansai Electric Power Company
- Installed capacity: 37 MW

Makio Dam (Japanese: 牧尾ダム) is a dam in Nagano Prefecture, Japan, completed in 1961.
