= Kiso District =

District in Nagano prefecture, Japan

Coordinates: 35.816°N 137.62°E

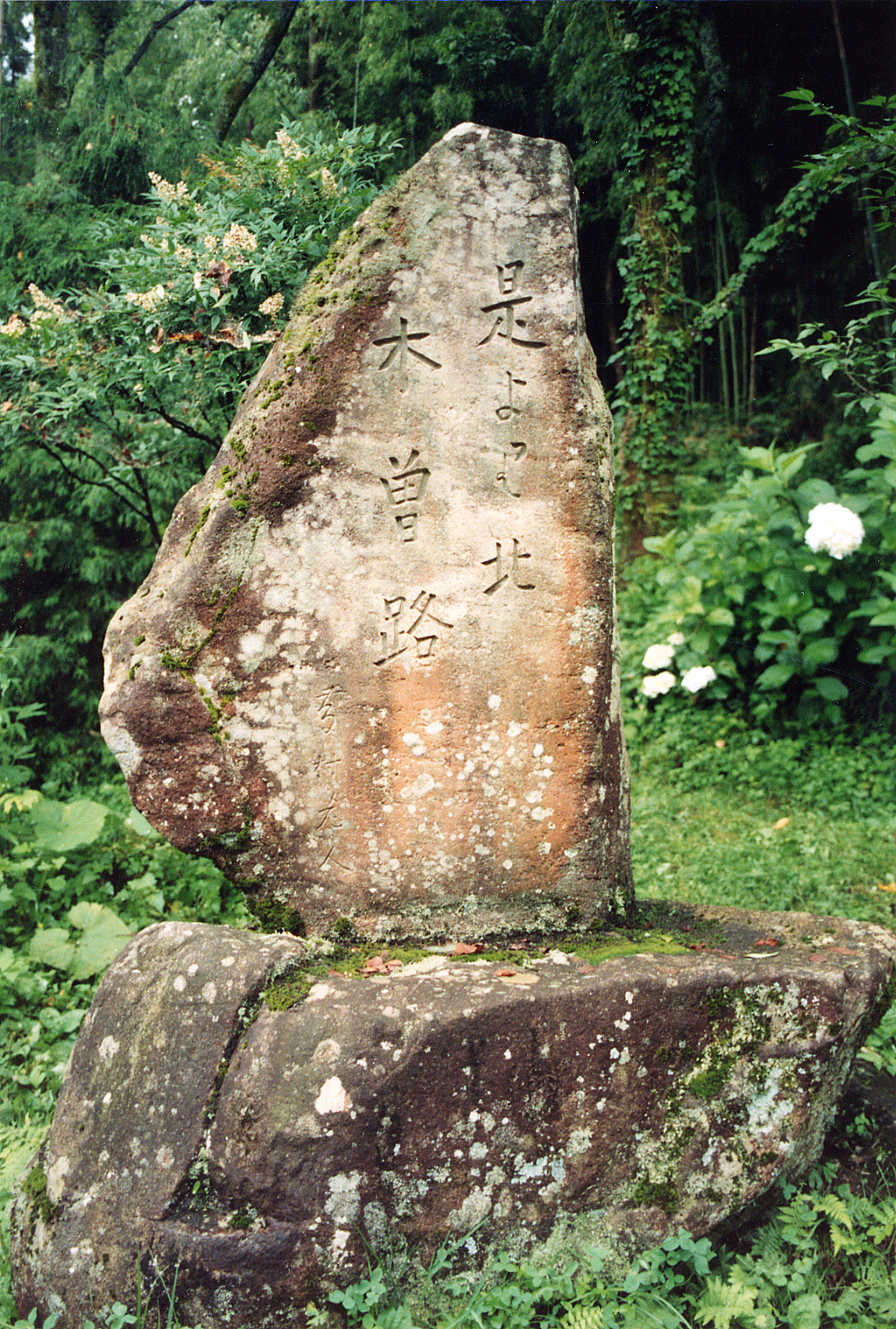
Marker for Kisoji

Kiso (木曽郡, Kiso-gun) is a district located in Nagano Prefecture, Japan.

As of November 1, 2005, the district has an estimated population of 34,759 with a density of 22.48 persons per km^{2}. The total area is 1,546.26 km^{2}.

== Municipalities ==
The district consists of three towns and three villages:

- Agematsu (Note: Classified as a town.)
- Kiso Town
- Kiso Village (Note: Classified as a village.)
- Nagiso
- Ōkuwa
- Ōtaki

== History ==
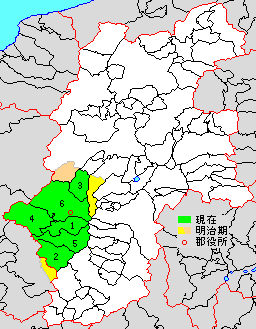
Map showing original extent of Kiso District in Nagano Prefecture: * yellow - areas formerly within the district borders during the early Meiji period: 1. Agematsu-machi; 2. Nagiso-machi; 3. Kiso-mura; 4. Ōtaki-mura; 5. Ōkuwa-mura; 6. Kiso-machi

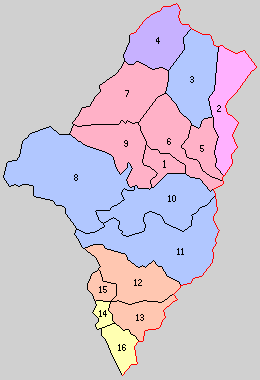
Colored areas are in this district.

Historically, the district was once known as Nishichikuma District (西筑摩郡, Nishichikuma-gun) until May 1, 1968.

=== District Timeline ===
- May 1, 1968 - The district was renamed to Kiso District.

=== Recent mergers ===
- February 13, 2005 - The village of Yamaguchi was merged into the expanded city of Nakatsugawa (located in Gifu Prefecture).
- April 1, 2005 - The village of Narakawa was merged into the expanded city of Shiojiri.
- November 1, 2005 - The town of Kisofukushima was merged with the villages of Mitake, Hiyoshi and Kaida to form the new town of Kiso.

== Points of interest ==
- Nakasendō, a former trade route between Edo (modern-day Tokyo) and Kyoto.
- Tsumago-juku, a restored post town on the Nakasendō.

== See also ==
- Kisobushi
- Kiso Valley
