= Kiso, Nagano (town) =

Kiso 木曽町
- Town
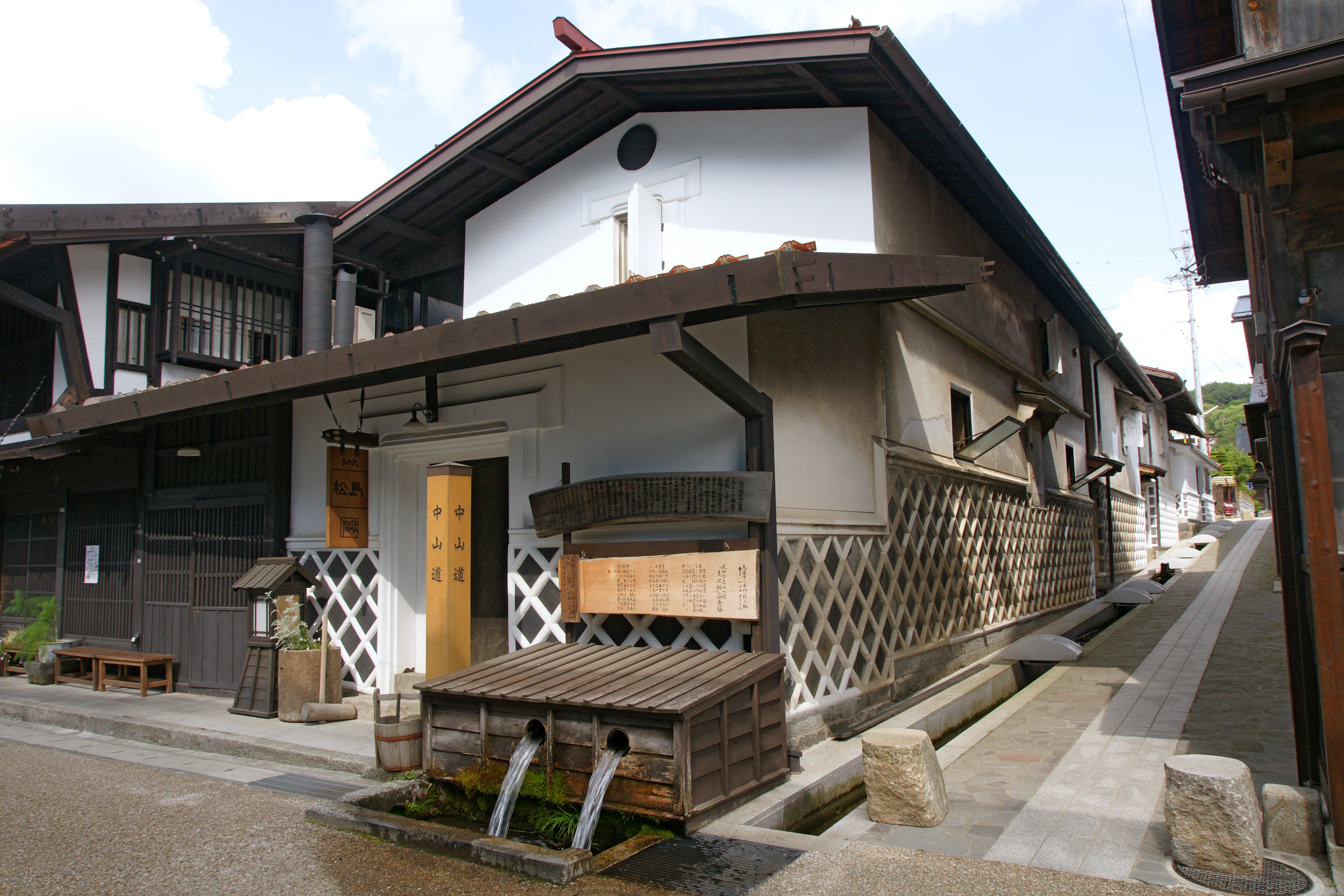

- Flag Seal

- Location of Kiso Town in Nagano Prefecture

- Coordinates: 35°50′33.1″N 137°41′29.6″E
- Country: Japan
- Region: Chūbu (Kōshin'etsu)
- Prefecture: Nagano
- District: Kiso

Area
  - Total: 476.03 km^{2} (183.80 sq mi)

Population (April 2019)
  - Total: 11,045
  - Density: 23.202/km^{2} (60.094/sq mi)
- Time zone: UTC+9 (Japan Standard Time)
- Phone number: 0264-22-3000
- Address: 2326-1 Fukushima, Kiso-machi, Kiso-gun, Nagano-ken 397-8588
- Climate: Dfa
- Website: Official website

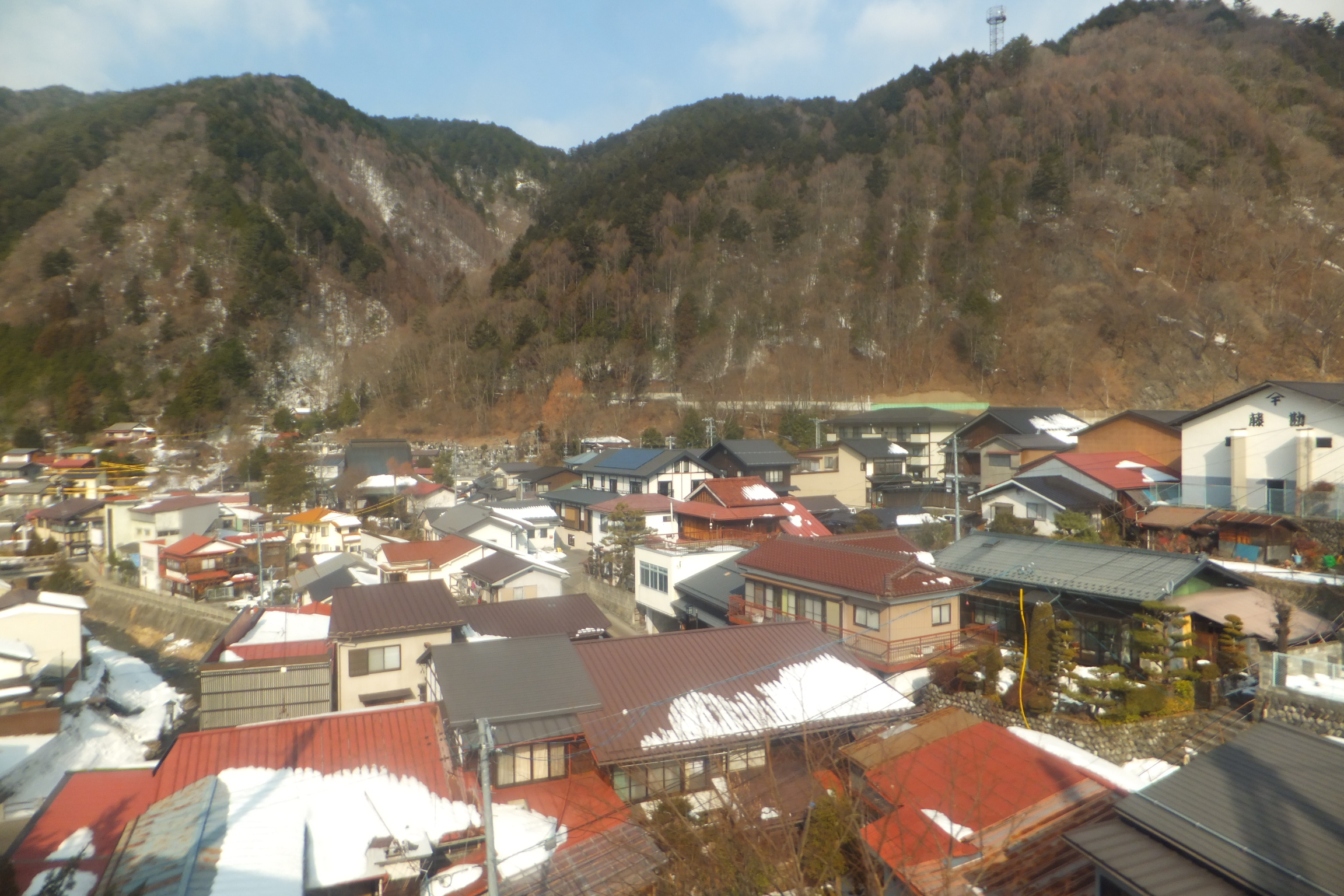
Center of Kiso town

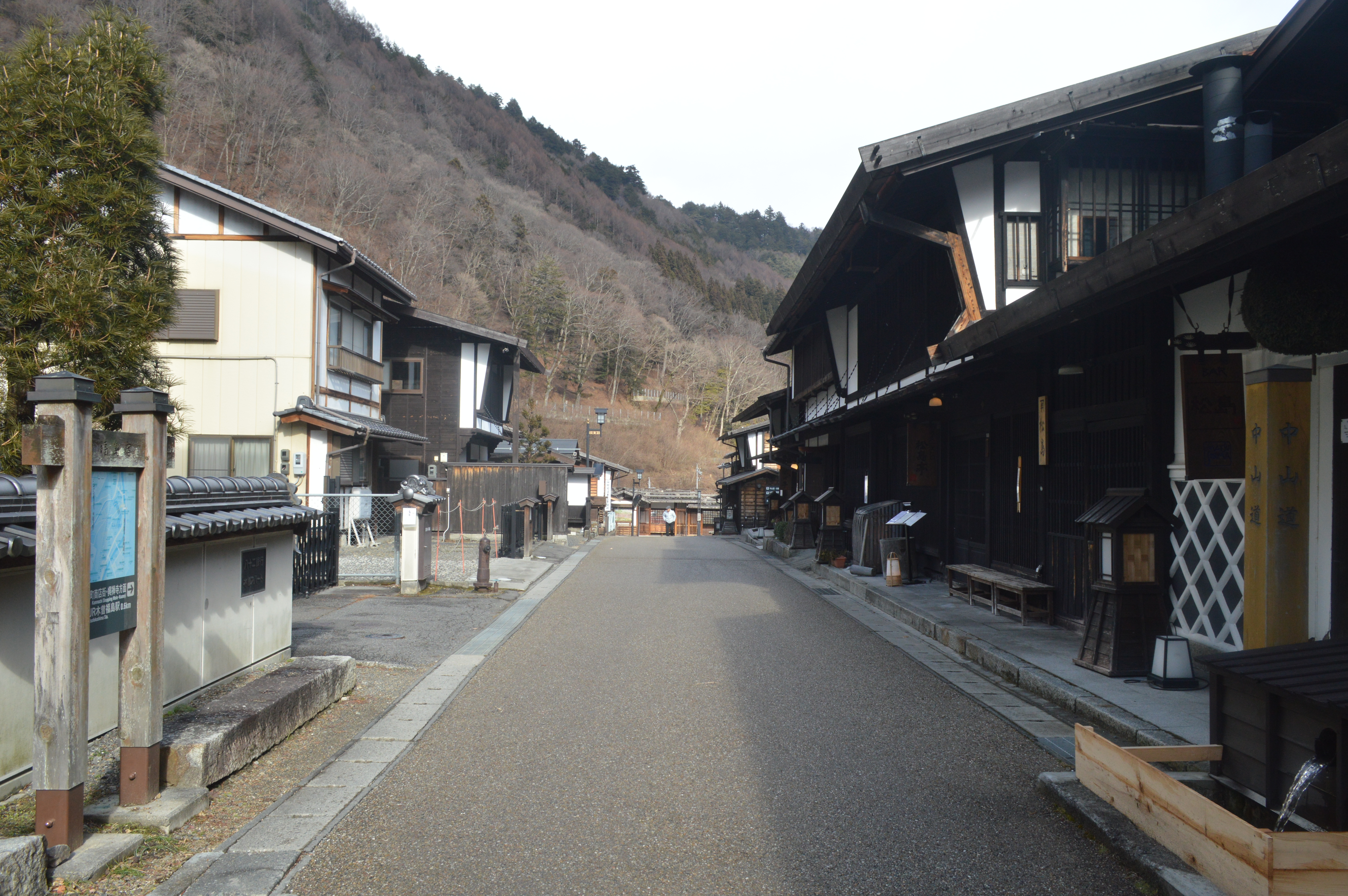
Fukushima-juku

Kiso (木曽町, Kiso-machi) is a town located in Nagano Prefecture, Japan. As of 5 April 2019, the town had an estimated population of 11,045 in 4892 households, and a population density of 23 persons per km^{2}. The total area of the town is 476.03 square kilometres (183.80 sq mi). Kiso Town is listed as one of The Most Beautiful Villages in Japan.

== Geography ==
Kiso is located in mountainous southwest Nagano Prefecture, bordered by Gifu Prefecture to the west.

=== Surrounding municipalities ===
- Gifu Prefecture
  - Gero
  - Takayama
- Nagano Prefecture
  - Agematsu
  - Ina
  - Kiso (village)
  - Matsumoto
  - Miyada
  - Ōtaki
  - Shiojiri

== Climate ==
The town has a climate characterized by characterized by warm and humid summers, and cold winters with heavy snowfall (Köppen climate classification Dfb). The average annual temperature in Kiso is 10.8 °C (51.4 °F). The average annual rainfall is 1,926.7 mm (75.85 in) with July as the wettest month. The temperatures are highest on average in August, at around 23.2 °C (73.8 °F), and lowest in January, at around −1.4 °C (29.5 °F).

Climate data for Kisofukushima, Kiso (1991–2020 normals, extremes 1976–present)
Month	Jan	Feb	Mar	Apr	May	Jun	Jul	Aug	Sep	Oct	Nov	Dec	Year
Record high °C (°F)	15.2 (59.4)	19.3 (66.7)	23.6 (74.5)	29.1 (84.4)	31.6 (88.9)	35.6 (96.1)	36.6 (97.9)	36.1 (97.0)	35.4 (95.7)	30.8 (87.4)	23.8 (74.8)	19.4 (66.9)	36.6 (97.9)
Mean daily maximum °C (°F)	4.5 (40.1)	6.0 (42.8)	10.5 (50.9)	16.7 (62.1)	22.0 (71.6)	24.8 (76.6)	28.0 (82.4)	29.8 (85.6)	25.8 (78.4)	20.0 (68.0)	13.9 (57.0)	7.5 (45.5)	17.5 (63.5)
Daily mean °C (°F)	−1.4 (29.5)	−0.5 (31.1)	3.5 (38.3)	9.4 (48.9)	14.7 (58.5)	18.6 (65.5)	22.3 (72.1)	23.2 (73.8)	19.3 (66.7)	12.9 (55.2)	6.6 (43.9)	1.3 (34.3)	10.8 (51.4)
Mean daily minimum °C (°F)	−6.4 (20.5)	−6.1 (21.0)	−2.3 (27.9)	2.7 (36.9)	8.3 (46.9)	13.8 (56.8)	18.1 (64.6)	18.8 (65.8)	14.8 (58.6)	8.0 (46.4)	1.3 (34.3)	−3.5 (25.7)	5.6 (42.1)
Record low °C (°F)	−16.4 (2.5)	−18.8 (−1.8)	−13.1 (8.4)	−7.3 (18.9)	−2.2 (28.0)	2.8 (37.0)	9.9 (49.8)	9.3 (48.7)	1.5 (34.7)	−2.8 (27.0)	−7.7 (18.1)	−14.4 (6.1)	−18.8 (−1.8)
Average precipitation mm (inches)	63.2 (2.49)	83.2 (3.28)	146.8 (5.78)	157.2 (6.19)	177.0 (6.97)	220.7 (8.69)	289.7 (11.41)	187.8 (7.39)	231.0 (9.09)	183.5 (7.22)	112.7 (4.44)	73.9 (2.91)	1,926.7 (75.85)
Average precipitation days (≥ 1.0 mm)	7.2	7.3	10.8	11.3	11.6	13.8	14.9	11.8	12.1	10.5	8.3	8.6	128.2
Mean monthly sunshine hours	141.1	155.2	181.5	198.8	210.0	160.2	166.1	195.1	157.1	158.4	149.9	131.9	2,005.3
Source: Japan Meteorological Agency (1991–2020 normals, extremes 1976–present)

Climate data for Kaida Kōgen, Kiso (1991–2020 normals, extremes 1978–present)
Month	Jan	Feb	Mar	Apr	May	Jun	Jul	Aug	Sep	Oct	Nov	Dec	Year
Record high °C (°F)	11.4 (52.5)	14.5 (58.1)	20.4 (68.7)	26.9 (80.4)	29.6 (85.3)	31.2 (88.2)	32.2 (90.0)	32.2 (90.0)	30.8 (87.4)	24.9 (76.8)	21.1 (70.0)	17.2 (63.0)	32.2 (90.0)
Mean daily maximum °C (°F)	0.2 (32.4)	1.5 (34.7)	5.8 (42.4)	12.9 (55.2)	18.8 (65.8)	21.7 (71.1)	25.0 (77.0)	26.3 (79.3)	21.9 (71.4)	16.1 (61.0)	9.9 (49.8)	3.3 (37.9)	13.6 (56.5)
Daily mean °C (°F)	−4.8 (23.4)	−4.1 (24.6)	−0.2 (31.6)	6.0 (42.8)	11.6 (52.9)	15.5 (59.9)	19.4 (66.9)	20.0 (68.0)	15.9 (60.6)	9.5 (49.1)	3.5 (38.3)	−1.9 (28.6)	7.6 (45.7)
Mean daily minimum °C (°F)	−10.9 (12.4)	−10.8 (12.6)	−6.3 (20.7)	−0.9 (30.4)	4.3 (39.7)	10.1 (50.2)	14.8 (58.6)	15.2 (59.4)	11.0 (51.8)	3.9 (39.0)	−2.3 (27.9)	−7.2 (19.0)	1.8 (35.2)
Record low °C (°F)	−21.6 (−6.9)	−22.0 (−7.6)	−19.2 (−2.6)	−15.8 (3.6)	−6.4 (20.5)	−0.7 (30.7)	5.1 (41.2)	5.3 (41.5)	−2.2 (28.0)	−7.1 (19.2)	−13.1 (8.4)	−21.0 (−5.8)	−22.0 (−7.6)
Average precipitation mm (inches)	76.8 (3.02)	94.2 (3.71)	162.2 (6.39)	174.4 (6.87)	202.3 (7.96)	240.5 (9.47)	304.0 (11.97)	199.6 (7.86)	252.6 (9.94)	200.0 (7.87)	126.1 (4.96)	92.9 (3.66)	2,109.9 (83.07)
Average snowfall cm (inches)	127 (50)	115 (45)	91 (36)	14 (5.5)	0 (0)	0 (0)	0 (0)	0 (0)	0 (0)	0 (0)	6 (2.4)	79 (31)	430 (169)
Average precipitation days (≥ 1.0 mm)	11.5	10.4	12.3	11.6	12.1	14.4	15.7	13.1	12.5	11.0	9.1	11.4	145.0
Source: Japan Meteorological Agency (1991–2020 normals, extremes 1978–present)

== History ==
The area of present-day Kiso was part of ancient Shinano Province.

The modern town was created through a merger of the town of Kiso-Fukushima with the villages of Hiyoshi, Kaida and Mitake on November 1, 2005.

== Demographics ==
Per Japanese census data, the population of Kiso has quickly fallen over the past 60 years and is now less than half of what it was in 1940.

Historical population
Year	Pop.	±%
1940	22,256	—
1950	22,190	−0.3%
1960	22,429	+1.1%
1970	18,868	−15.9%
1980	17,426	−7.6%
1990	15,789	−9.4%
2000	14,866	−5.8%
2010	12,743	−14.3%
2020	10,584	−16.9%

== Education ==
Kiso has four public elementary schools and three public middle schools operated by the town government, and one high school operated the Nagano Prefectural Board of Education. The prefectural also operates a special education school. The Solar-Terrestrial Environment Laboratory, Nagoya University is located in Kiso.

Kurokawa Elementary School opened in 1928 and closed in 1997; in 2022 it became a museum showcasing wooden toys.

== Transportation ==
=== Railway ===
- JR Tōkai – Chūō Main Line
  - Miyanokoshi - Harano - Kiso-Fukushima

=== Highway ===
- National Route 19
- National Route 361

== Local attractions ==
- Mount Ontake
