= Murai Station =

Railway station in Matsumoto, Nagano Prefecture, Japan

SN03 Murai Station 村井駅
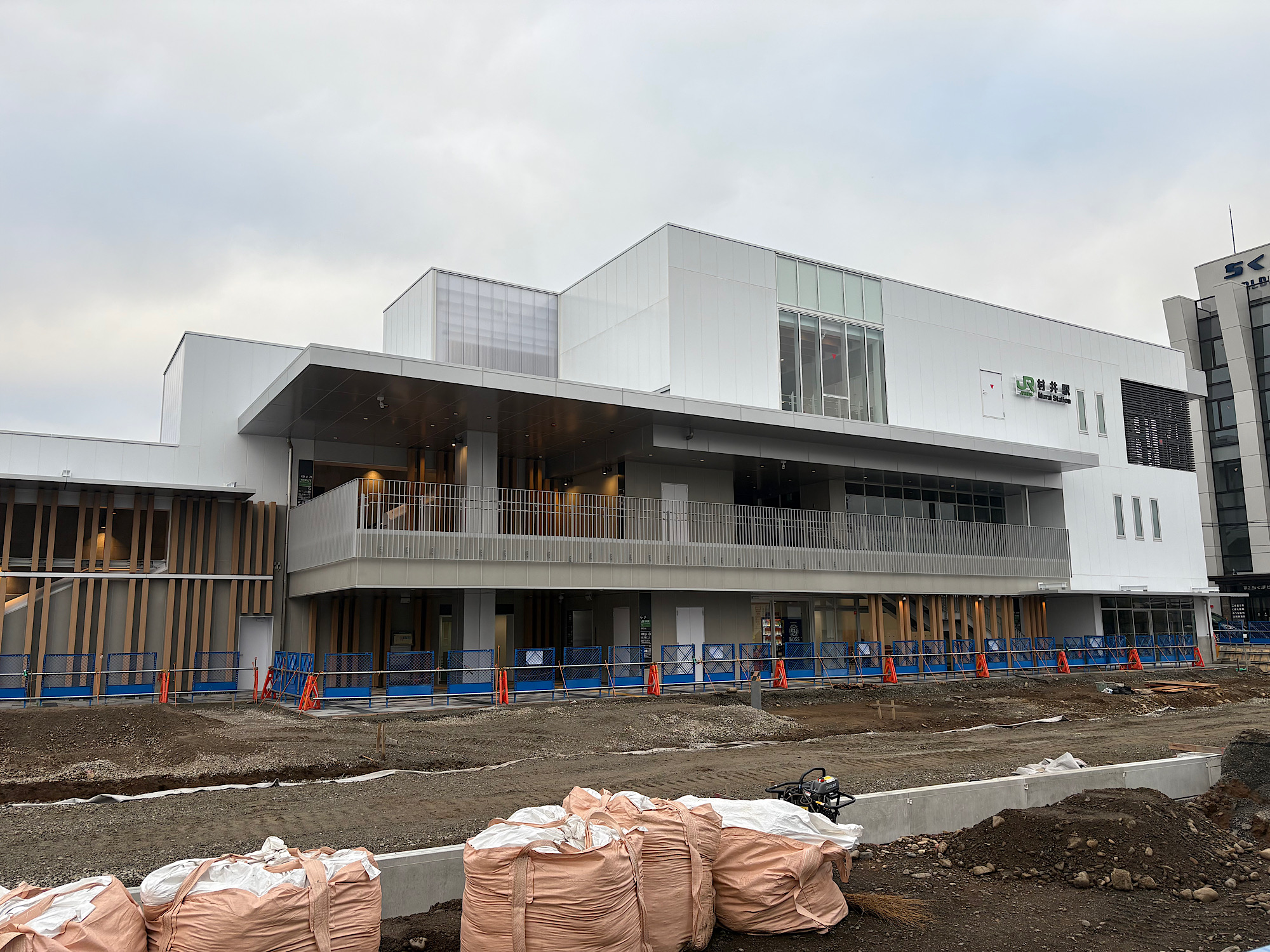
- Murai Station, October 2024

General information
- Location: 1-36-14 Muraimachi-Minami Matsumoto-shi, Nagano-ken 399-0036; Japan
- Coordinates: 36.1745°N 137.9565°E
- Elevation: 628.85 meters
- Operator: East Japan Railway Company; Japan Freight Railway Company
- Line: Shinonoi Line
- Distance: 6.8 km from Shiojiri
- Platforms: 1 island platform

Other information
- Status: Staffed (Midori no Madoguchi)
- Station code: SN03
- Website: Official website

History
- Opened: 15 December 1902

Passengers
- FY2015: 1776 (daily)

Services
Preceding station	JR East	Following station
Hirooka SN02 towards Shiojiri	Shinonoi Line Rapid; Local & Rapid Misuzu	Hirata SN04 towards Shinonoi
Location
- Location within Nagano Prefecture Location within Japan

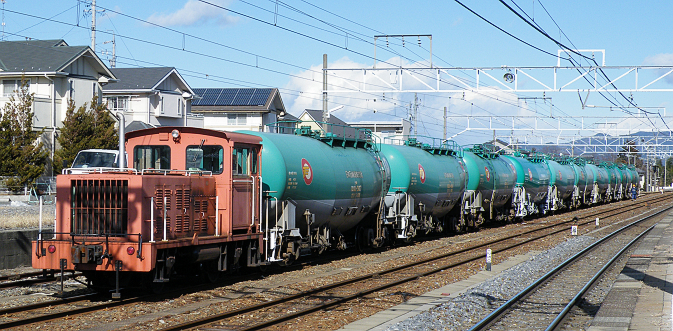
Oil cars of the Japan Freight Railway Company at Murai Station

Murai Station (村井駅, Murai-eki) is a train station in the city of Matsumoto, Nagano Prefecture, Japan, operated by East Japan Railway Company (JR East), with a freight terminal operated by the Japan Freight Railway Company.

== Lines ==
Murai Station is served by the Shinonoi Line and is 6.8 kilometers from the terminus of the line at Shiojiri Station.Many trains of the Chūō Main Line continue past the nominal intermediate terminus of the line at Shiojiri and continue on to Matsumoto via this station.

== Station layout ==
The station consists of a single ground-level island platform, connected to the station building by a level crossing. The station has a Midori no Madoguchi staffed ticket office.

=== Platforms ===
1	■ Shinonoi Line	for Shiojiri and Kami-Suwa
2	■ Shinonoi Line	for Matsumoto, Shinonoi and Nagano

== History ==
Murai Station opened on 15 December 1902. With the privatization of Japanese National Railways (JNR) on 1 April 1987, the station came under the control of JR East. Station numbering introduced on the line from February 2025, with the station being assigned number SN03.

== Passenger statistics ==
In fiscal 2015, the station was used by an average of 1776 passengers daily (boarding passengers only).

== Surrounding area ==
- National Route 19

== See also ==
- List of railway stations in Japan
