= Tazawa Station =

Railway station in Azumino, Nagano Prefecture, Japan

SN07 Tazawa Station 田沢駅
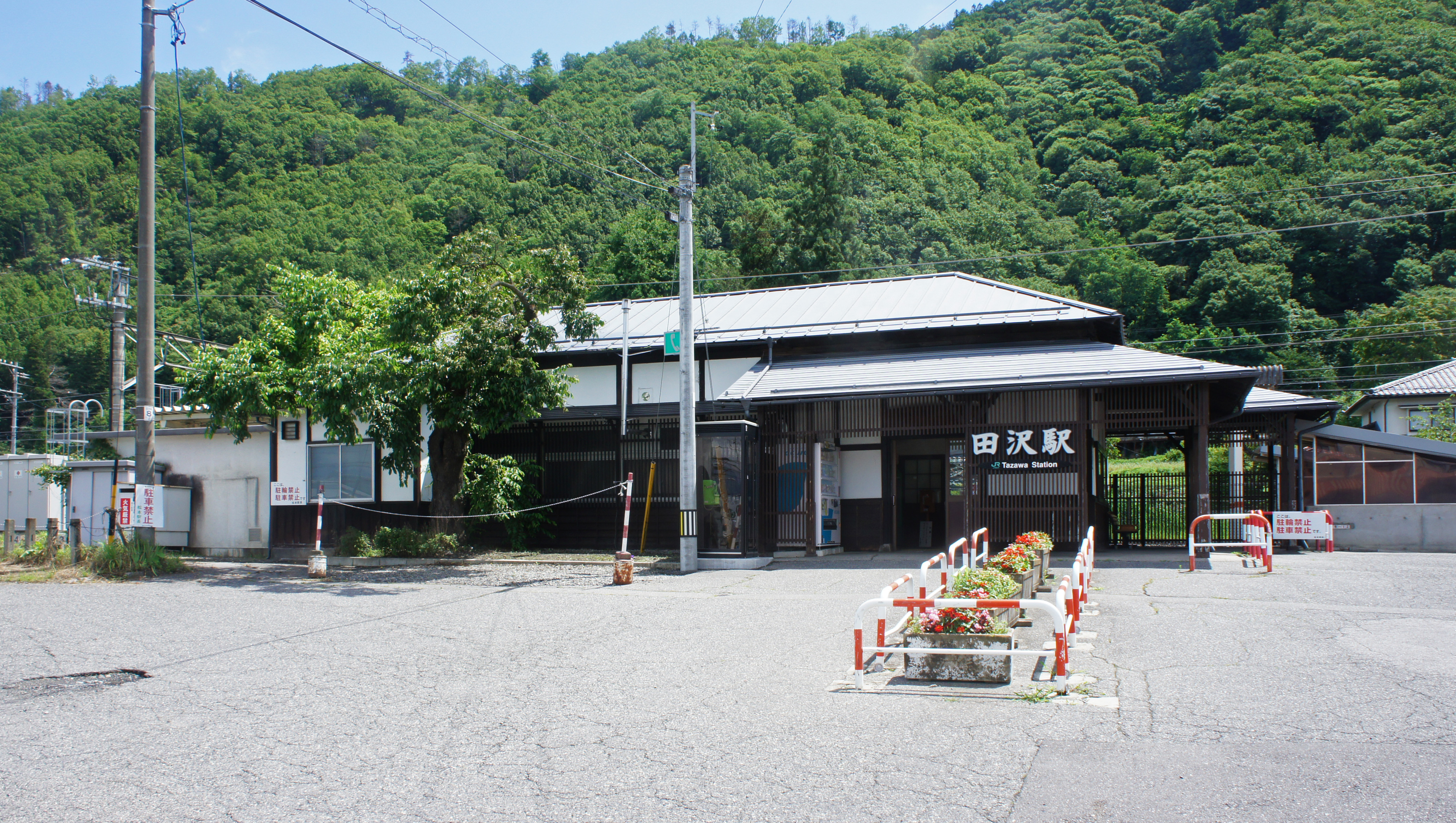
- Tazawa Station, July 2021

General information
- Location: 5148-2 Toyoshina-Tazawa, Azumino-shi, Nagano-ken 399-7102; Japan
- Coordinates: 36.3019°N 137.9403°E
- Elevation: 555.9 meters
- Operator: JR East
- Line: Shinonoi Line
- Distance: 21.6 km from Shiojiri
- Platforms: 1 island platform

Other information
- Status: Staffed
- Station code: SN07
- Website: Official website

History
- Opened: 15 June 1902

Passengers
- FY2015: 530

Services
Preceding station	JR East	Following station
Matsumoto SN06 towards Shiojiri	Shinonoi Line Rapid; Local & Rapid Misuzu	Akashina SN08 towards Shinonoi
Location
- Location within Nagano Prefecture Location within Japan

Tazawa Station (田沢駅, Tazawa-eki) is a train station in the city of Azumino, Nagano Prefecture, Japan, operated by East Japan Railway Company (JR East).

== Lines ==
Tazawa Station is served by the Shinonoi Line and is 21.6 kilometers from the terminus of the line at Shiojiri Station.

== Station layout ==
The station consists of one ground-level island platform serving a two tracks, connected to the station building by an underground passage. The station is a Kan'i itaku station.

=== Platforms ===
1	■ Shinonoi Line	for Shinonoi and Nagano
2	■ Shinonoi Line	for Matsumoto and Shiojiri

== History ==
Tazawa Station opened on 15 June 1902. With the privatization of Japanese National Railways (JNR) on 1 April 1987, the station came under the control of JR East. Station numbering introduced on the line from February 2025, with the station being assigned number SN07.

== Passenger statistics ==
In fiscal 2015, the station was used by an average of 530 passengers daily (boarding passengers only).

== Surrounding area ==
- Toyoshina-Higashi Elementary School
- National Route 19

== See also ==
- List of railway stations in Japan
