= Sakakita Station =

Railway station in Chikuhoku, Nagano Prefecture, Japan

SN10 Sakakita Station 坂北駅
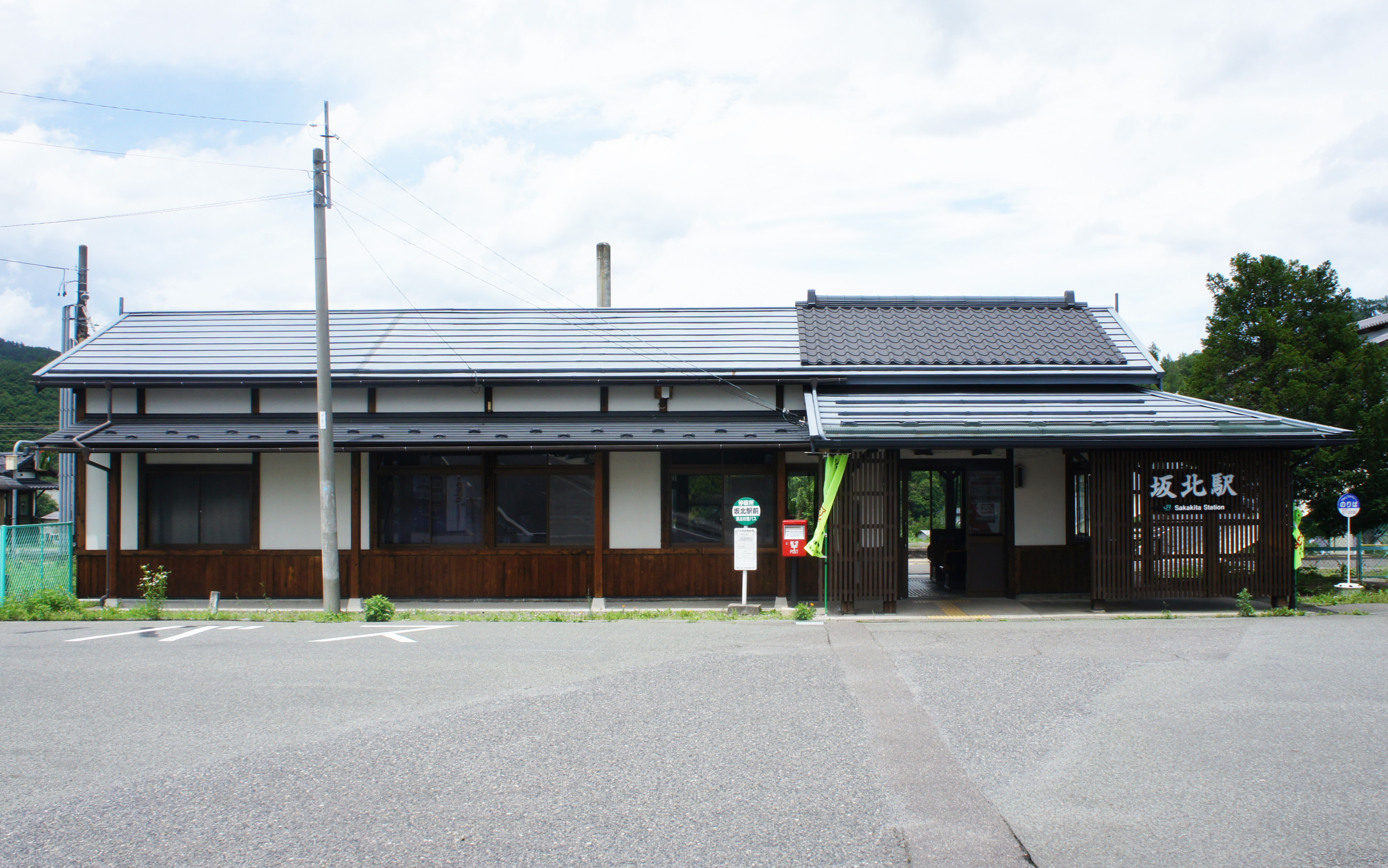
- Sakakita Station, July 2021

General information
- Location: 3887-6 Sakakita, Chikuhoku-mura, Higashichikuma-gun, Nagano-ken 399-7601; Japan
- Coordinates: 36.4307°N 138.0156°E
- Elevation: 601.0 meters
- Operator: JR East
- Line: Shinonoi Line
- Distance: 40.9 km from Shiojiri
- Platforms: 1 island + 1 side platform

Other information
- Status: Staffed
- Station code: SN10
- Website: Official website

History
- Opened: 3 November 1927

Passengers
- FY2015: 136

Services
Preceding station	JR East	Following station
Nishijō SN09 (limited service) towards Shiojiri	Shinonoi Line Rapid (limited service)	Hijiri-Kōgen SN11 towards Shinonoi
Nishijō SN09 towards Shiojiri	Shinonoi Line Local & Rapid Misuzu	Hijiri-Kōgen SN11 towards Shinonoi
Location
- Location within Nagano Prefecture Location within Japan

Sakakita Station (坂北駅, Sakakita-eki) is a train station in the village of Chikuhoku, Higashichikuma District, Nagano Prefecture, Japan, operated by East Japan Railway Company (JR East).

== Lines ==
Sakakita Station is served by the Shinonoi Line and is 40.9 kilometers from the terminus of the line at Shiojiri Station.

== Station layout ==
The station consists of one ground-level island platform and one side platform serving a three tracks, connected to the station building by a footbridge. The station is a Kan'i itaku station.

=== Platforms ===
1	■ Shinonoi Line	for Matsumoto and Shiojiri
2	■ Shinonoi Line	for Shinonoi and Nagano
3	■ Shinonoi Line	(siding)

== History ==
Sakakita Station opened on 3 November 1927. With the privatization of Japanese National Railways (JNR) on 1 April 1987, the station came under the control of JR East. Station numbering introduced on the line from February 2025, with the station being assigned number SN10.

== Passenger statistics ==
In fiscal 2015, the station was used by an average of 136 passengers daily (boarding passengers only).

== Surrounding area ==
- former Sakakita village office
- Sakakita Post Office
- Sakakita Elementary School
- National Route 403

== See also ==
- List of railway stations in Japan
