= Kamuriki Station =

Railway station in Chikuhoku, Nagano Prefecture, Japan

SN12 Kamuriki Station 冠着駅
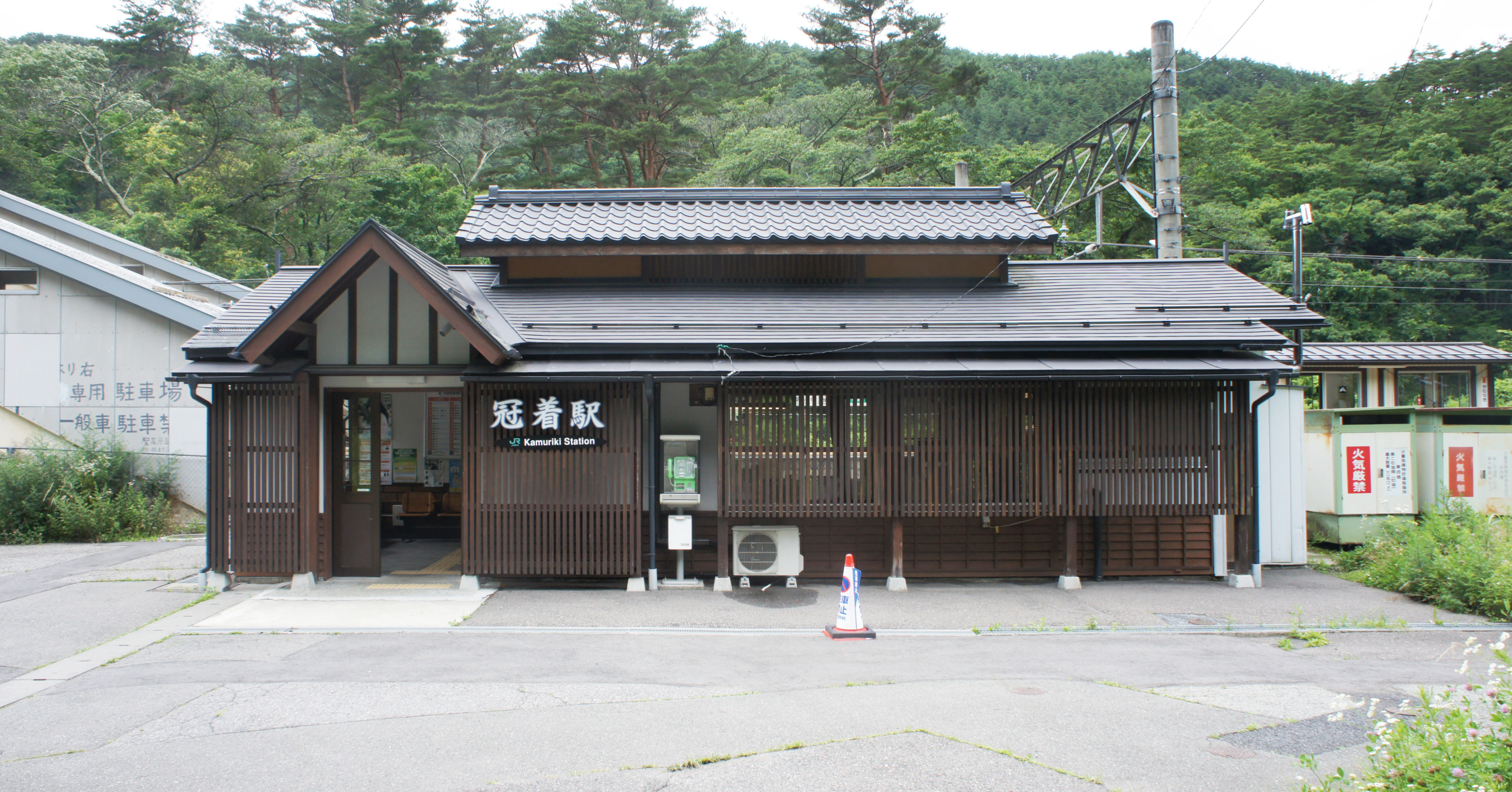
- Kamuriki Station, July 2021

General information
- Location: 1852 Sakai, Chikuhoku-mura, Higashichikuma-gun, Nagano-ken 399-7711; Japan
- Coordinates: 36.4573°N 138.0792°E
- Elevation: 676.0 meters
- Operator: JR East
- Line: Shinonoi Line
- Distance: 48.3 km from Shiojiri
- Platforms: 2 side platform

Other information
- Station code: SN12
- Website: Official website

History
- Opened: 1 April 1945

Passengers
- FY2015: 77

Services
Preceding station	JR East	Following station
Hijiri-Kōgen SN11 towards Shiojiri	Shinonoi Line Rapid (limited service)	Obasute SN13 (limited service) towards Shinonoi
Hijiri-Kōgen SN11 towards Shiojiri	Shinonoi Line Local & Rapid Misuzu	Obasute SN13 towards Shinonoi
Location
- Location within Nagano Prefecture Location within Japan

Kamuriki Station (冠着駅, Kamuriki-eki) is a train station in the village of Chikuhoku, Higashichikuma District, Nagano Prefecture, Japan, operated by East Japan Railway Company (JR East).

== Lines ==
Kamuriki Station is served by the Shinonoi Line and is 48.3 kilometers from the terminus of the line at Shiojiri Station.

== Station layout ==
The station consists of two ground-level opposed side platforms serving a two tracks, connected to the station building by a footbridge. The station is a Kan'i itaku station.

=== Platforms ===
1	■ Shinonoi Line	for Matsumoto and Shiojiri
2	■ Shinonoi Line	for Shinonoi and Nagano

== History ==
Kamuriki Station opened on 1 April 1945. With the privatization of Japanese National Railways (JNR) on 1 April 1987, the station came under the control of JR East. Station numbering was introduced on the line from February 2025, with the station being assigned number SN12.

== Passenger statistics ==
In fiscal 2015, the station was used by an average of 77 passengers daily (boarding passengers only).

== Surrounding area ==
The station is located in a rural area, with no residences or buildings nearby.

== See also ==
- List of railway stations in Japan
