= Hijiri-Kōgen Station =

Railway station in Omi, Nagano Prefecture, Japan

SN11 Hijiri-Kōgen Station 聖高原駅
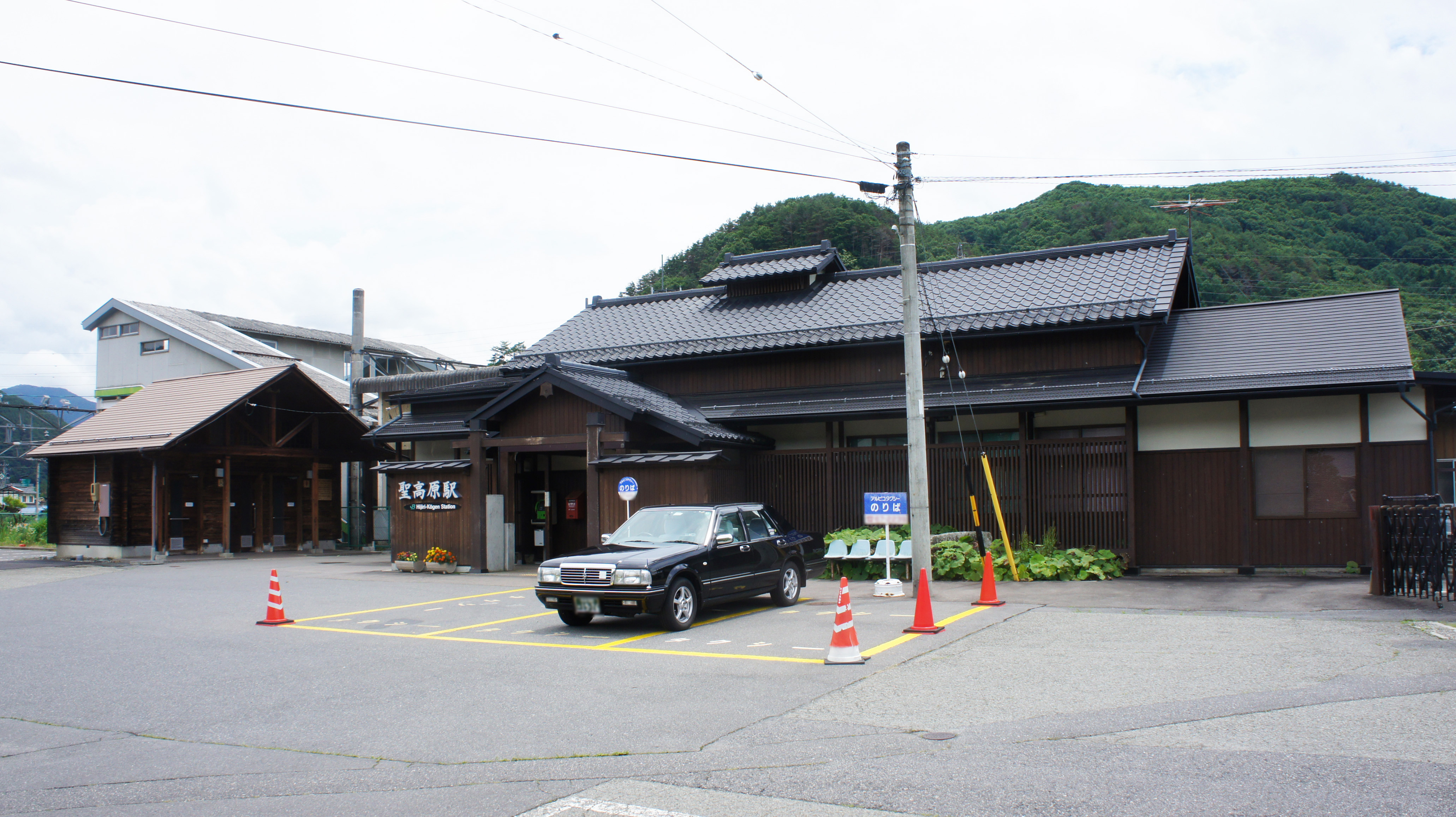
- Hijiri-Kōgen Station, July 2021

General information
- Location: Urushida, Omi-mura, Higashichikuma-gun, Nagano-ken 399-7701; Japan
- Coordinates: 36.4550°N 138.0478°E
- Elevation: 621.4 meters
- Operator: JR East
- Line: Shinonoi Line
- Distance: 45.0 km from Shiojiri
- Platforms: 1 island + 1 side platform

Other information
- Status: Staffed
- Station code: SN11
- Website: Official website

History
- Opened: 1 November 1900
- Former names: Omi Station (to 1976)

Passengers
- FY2015: 311

Services
Preceding station	JR East	Following station
Akashina SN08 (limited service) towards Shiojiri	Shinano (limited service)	Shinonoi SN15 towards Nagano
Sakakita SN10 (limited service) towards Shiojiri	Shinonoi Line Rapid	Kamuriki SN12 (limited service) towards Shinonoi
Sakakita SN10 towards Shiojiri	Shinonoi Line Local & Rapid Misuzu	Kamuriki SN12 towards Shinonoi
Location
- Location within Nagano Prefecture Location within Japan

Hijiri-Kōgen Station (聖高原駅, Hijirikōgen-eki) is a train station in the village of Omi, Higashichikuma District, Nagano Prefecture, Japan, operated by East Japan Railway Company (JR East).

== Lines ==
Hijiri-Kōgen Station is served by the Shinonoi Line and is 45.0 kilometers from the terminus of the line at Shiojiri Station.

== Station layout ==
The station consists of one ground-level island platform and one side platform serving a three tracks, connected to the station building by a footbridge. The station has a Midori no Madoguchi staffed ticket office.

=== Platforms ===
1	■ Shinonoi Line	for Shinonoi and Nagano
2	■ Shinonoi Line	for Matsumoto and Shiojiri
3	■ Shinonoi Line	(siding)

== History ==
Hijiri-Kōgen Station opened on 1 November 1900 as Omi Station (麻績駅). It was renamed to its present name on 1 April 1976. With the privatization of Japanese National Railways (JNR) on 1 April 1987, the station came under the control of JR East. Station numbering was introduced on the line from February 2025, with the station being assigned number SN11.

== Passenger statistics ==
In fiscal 2015, the station was used by an average of 311 passengers daily (boarding passengers only).

== Surrounding area ==
- former Omi village office
- Omi Post Office
- National Route 403

== See also ==
- List of railway stations in Japan
