= Nishijō Station =

Railway station in Chikuhoku, Nagano Prefecture, Japan

SN09 Nishijō Station 西条駅
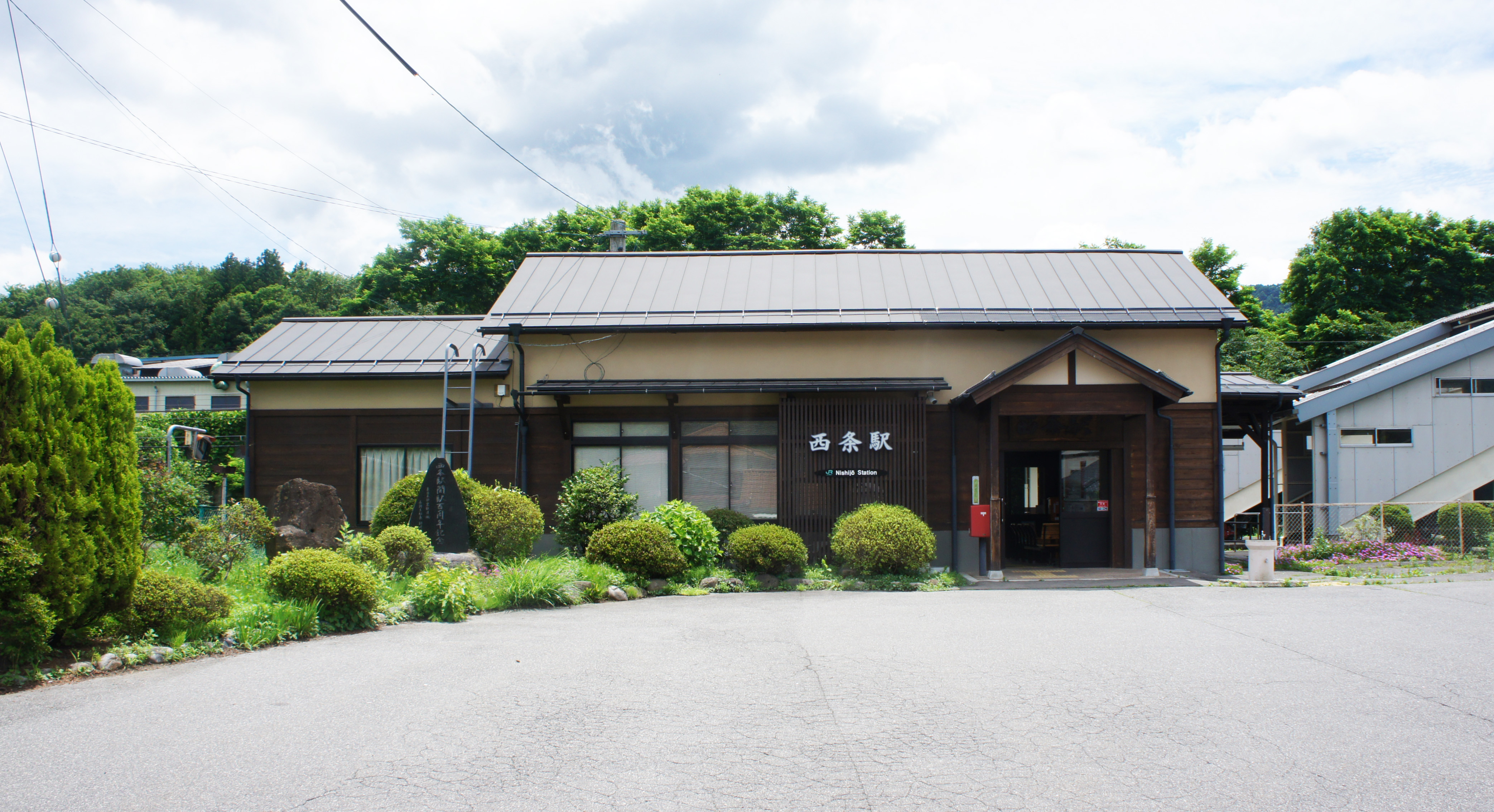
- Nishijō Station, July 2021

General information
- Location: 4152 Nishijō, Chikuhoku-mura, Higashichikuma-gun, Nagano-ken 399-7501; Japan
- Coordinates: 36°24′02″N 138°00′44″E
- Elevation: 661.9 meters
- Operator: JR East
- Line: Shinonoi Line
- Distance: 37.2 km from Shiojiri
- Platforms: 1 island + 1 side platform

Other information
- Status: Staffed
- Website: Official website

History
- Opened: 1 November 1900

Passengers
- FY2015: 178

Services
Preceding station	JR East	Following station
Akashina SN08 towards Shiojiri	Shinonoi Line Rapid (limited service)	Sakakita SN10 (limited service) towards Shinonoi
Akashina SN08 towards Shiojiri	Shinonoi Line Local & Rapid Misuzu	Sakakita SN10 towards Shinonoi
Location
- Location within Nagano Prefecture Location within Japan

Nishijō Station (西条駅, Nishijō-eki) is a train station in the village of Chikuhoku, Higashichikuma District, Nagano Prefecture, Japan, operated by East Japan Railway Company (JR East).

== Lines ==
Nishijō Station is served by the Shinonoi Line and is 37.2 kilometers from the terminus of the line at Shiojiri Station.

== Station layout ==
The station consists of one ground-level island platform and one side platform serving a three tracks, connected to the station building by a footbridge. The station is a Kan'i itaku station.

=== Platforms ===
1	■ Shinonoi Line	for Shinonoi and Nagano
2	■ Shinonoi Line	for Matsumoto and Shiojiri
3	■ Shinonoi Line	(siding)

== History ==
Nishijō Station opened on 1 November 1900. With the privatization of Japanese National Railways (JNR) on 1 April 1987, the station came under the control of JR East. Station numbering introduced on the line from February 2025, with the station being assigned number SN09.

== Passenger statistics ==
In fiscal 2015, the station was used by an average of 178 passengers daily (boarding passengers only).

== Surrounding area ==
- National Route 403

== See also ==
- List of railway stations in Japan
