= Akashina Station =

Railway station in Azumino, Nagano Prefecture, Japan

SN08 Akashina Station 明科駅
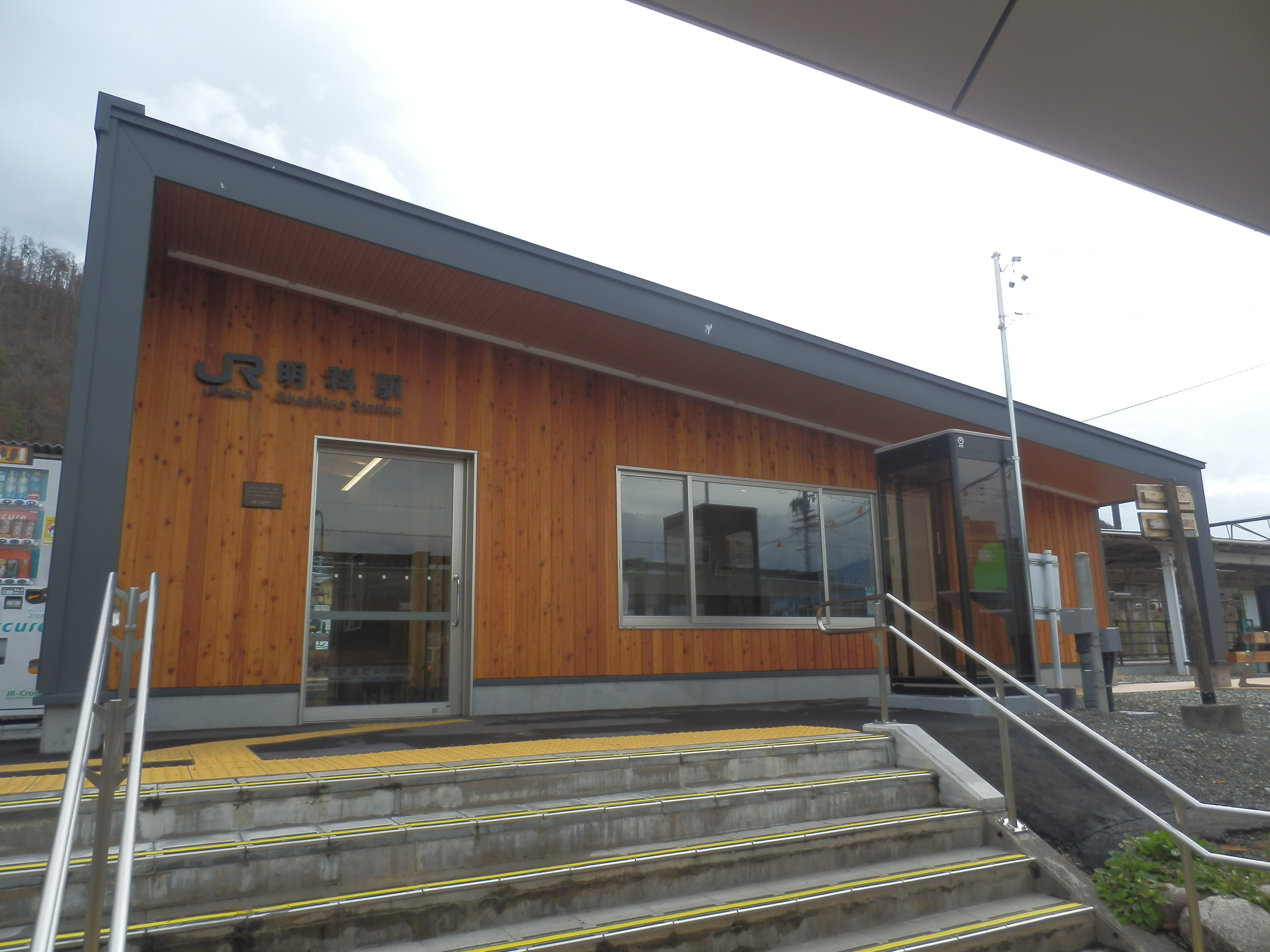
- Akashina Station, December 2023

General information
- Location: 3712 Akashina-Nakagawate, Azumino-shi, Nagano-ken 399-8203; Japan
- Coordinates: 36.3540°N 137.9300°E
- Elevation: 525.5 meters
- Operator: JR East
- Line: Shinonoi Line
- Distance: 28.2 km from Shiojiri
- Platforms: 1 island + 1 side platform

Other information
- Status: Staffed
- Website: Official website

History
- Opened: 15 June 1902

Passengers
- FY2015: 1067

Services
Preceding station	JR East	Following station
Matsumoto SN06 towards Shiojiri	Shinano (limited service)	Hijiri-Kōgen SN11 (limited service) towards Nagano
Tazawa SN07 towards Shiojiri	Shinonoi Line Rapid	Nishijō SN09 (limited service) towards Shinonoi
Tazawa SN07 towards Shiojiri	Shinonoi Line Local & Rapid Misuzu	Nishijō SN09 towards Shinonoi
Location
- Location within Nagano Prefecture Location within Japan

Akashina Station (明科駅, Akashina-eki) is a train station in the city of Azumino, Nagano Prefecture, Japan, operated by the East Japan Railway Company (JR East).

== Lines ==
Akashina Station is served by the Shinonoi Line, and is 28.2 kilometers from the terminus of the line at Shiojiri Station.

== Station layout ==
The station consists of one ground-level island platform and one side platform serving three tracks, connected to the station building by a footbridge. The station is a Kan'i itaku station.

=== Platforms ===
1	■ Shinonoi Line	for Shinonoi and Nagano
2	■ Shinonoi Line	siding
3	■ Shinonoi Line	for Matsumoto and Shiojiri

== History ==
Akashina Station opened on 15 June 1902. With the privatization of Japanese National Railways (JNR) on 1 April 1987, the station came under the control of JR East. Station numbering was introduced on the line from February 2025, with the station being assigned number SN08.

== Passenger statistics ==
In fiscal 2015, the station was used by an average of 1,067 passengers daily (boarding passengers only).

== Surrounding area ==
- former Akashina Town Hall
- National Route 19
- National Route 403

== See also ==
- List of railway stations in Japan
