= Obasute Station =

Railway station in Chikuma, Nagano Prefecture, Japan

SN13 Obasute Station 姨捨駅
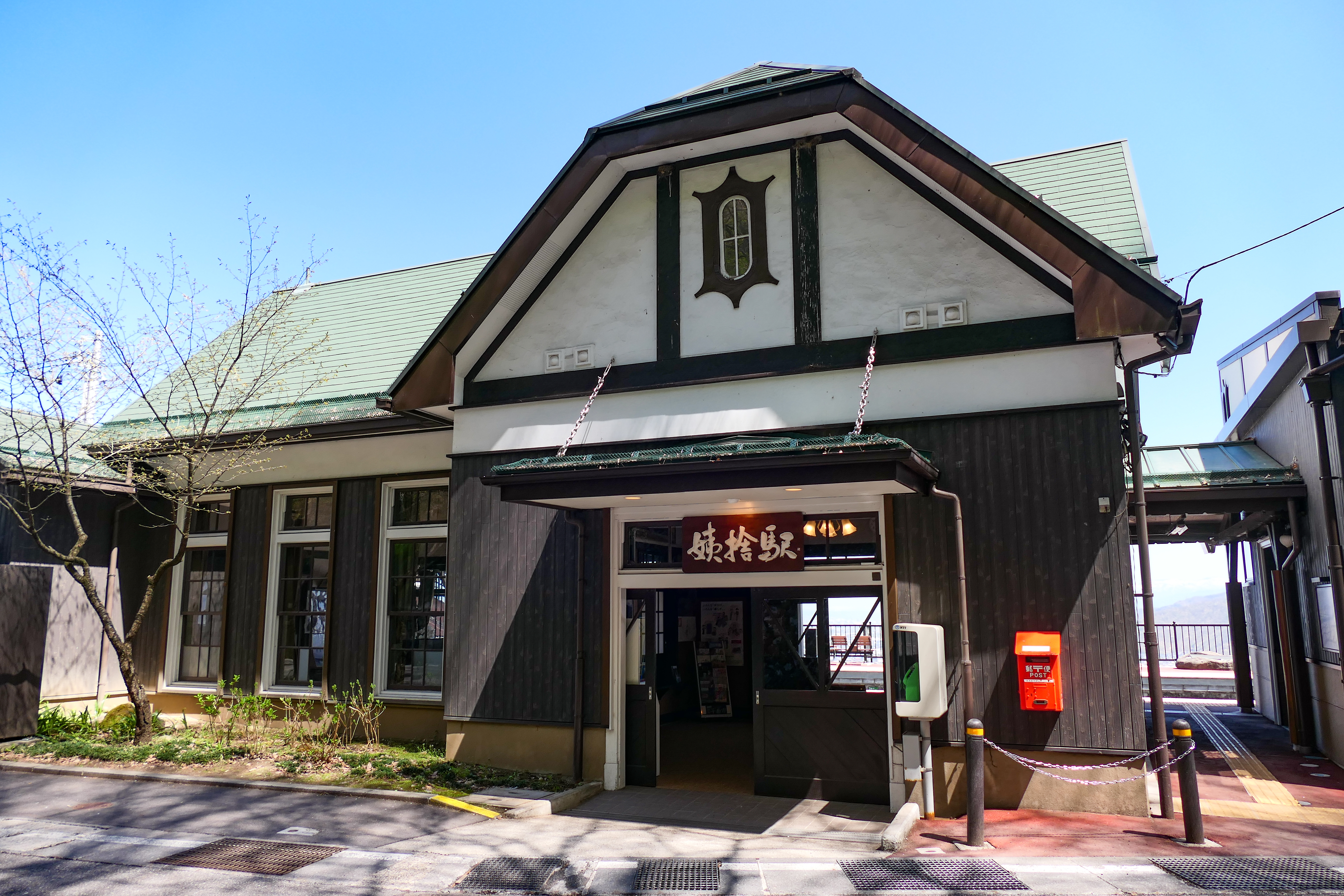
- Obasute Station in April 2022

General information
- Location: 4947 Yawata-Obasute, Chikuma-shi, Nagano-ken 387-0023; Japan
- Coordinates: 36.5028°N 138.0932°E
- Elevation: 551.2 m
- Operator: JR East
- Line: Shinonoi Line
- Distance: 54.2 km from Shiojiri
- Platforms: 2 side platforms
- Tracks: 2

Other information
- Station code: SN13
- Website: Official website

History
- Opened: 1 November 1900

Passengers
- FY2018: 64

Services
Preceding station	JR East	Following station
Kamuriki SN12 (limited service) towards Shiojiri	Shinonoi Line Rapid (limited service)	Inariyama SN14 (limited service) towards Shinonoi
Kamuriki SN12 towards Shiojiri	Shinonoi Line Local & Rapid Misuzu	Inariyama SN14 towards Shinonoi
Location
- Location within Nagano Prefecture Location within Japan

Obasute Station (姨捨駅, Obasute-eki) is a railway station on the Shinonoi Line in the city of Chikuma, Nagano Prefecture, Japan. It is operated by the East Japan Railway Company (JR East).

== Lines ==
Obasute Station, which is served by trains on the Shinonoi Line, is located 54.2 km (33.7 miles) from the terminus of the line at Shiojiri Station.

== Station layout ==
The station, which is unattended, is situated on a switchback, and has two side platforms connected by a footbridge. The station building is on the south platform. Through passenger trains not booked to call at Obasute do not use the switchback; however, freight trains make use of it if booked to cross a passenger service at this point.

=== Platforms ===
1	■ Shinonoi Line	for Shinonoi and Nagano
2	■ Shinonoi Line	for Matsumoto and Shiojiri

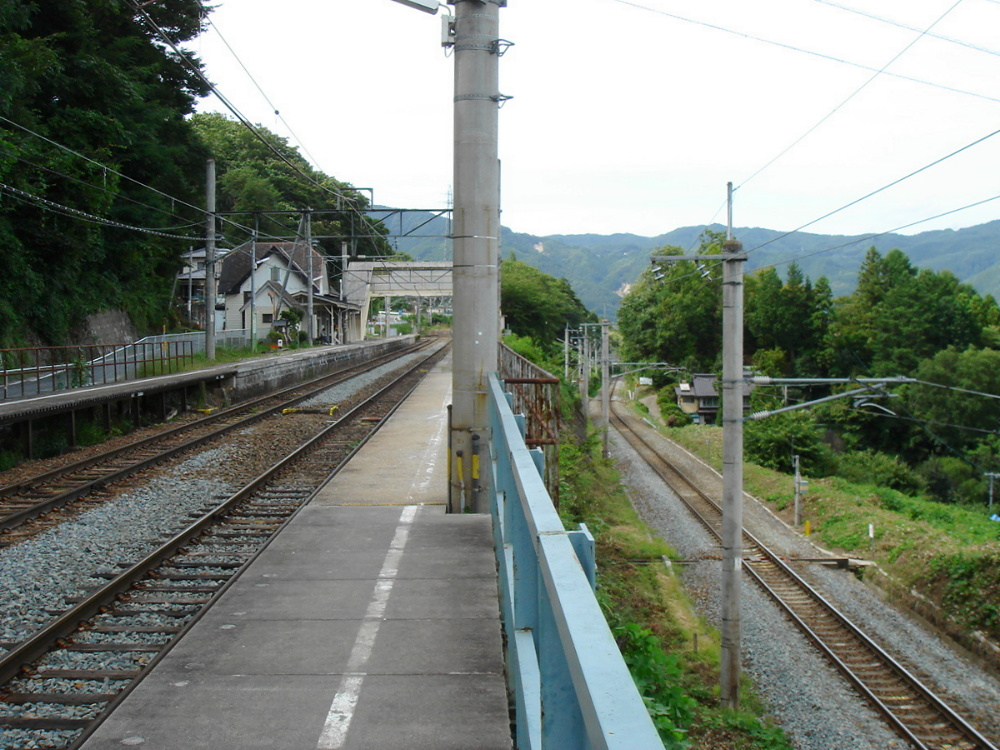
The dead-end station tracks on the switchback (left), with the main line seen descending towards Shinanoi on the right

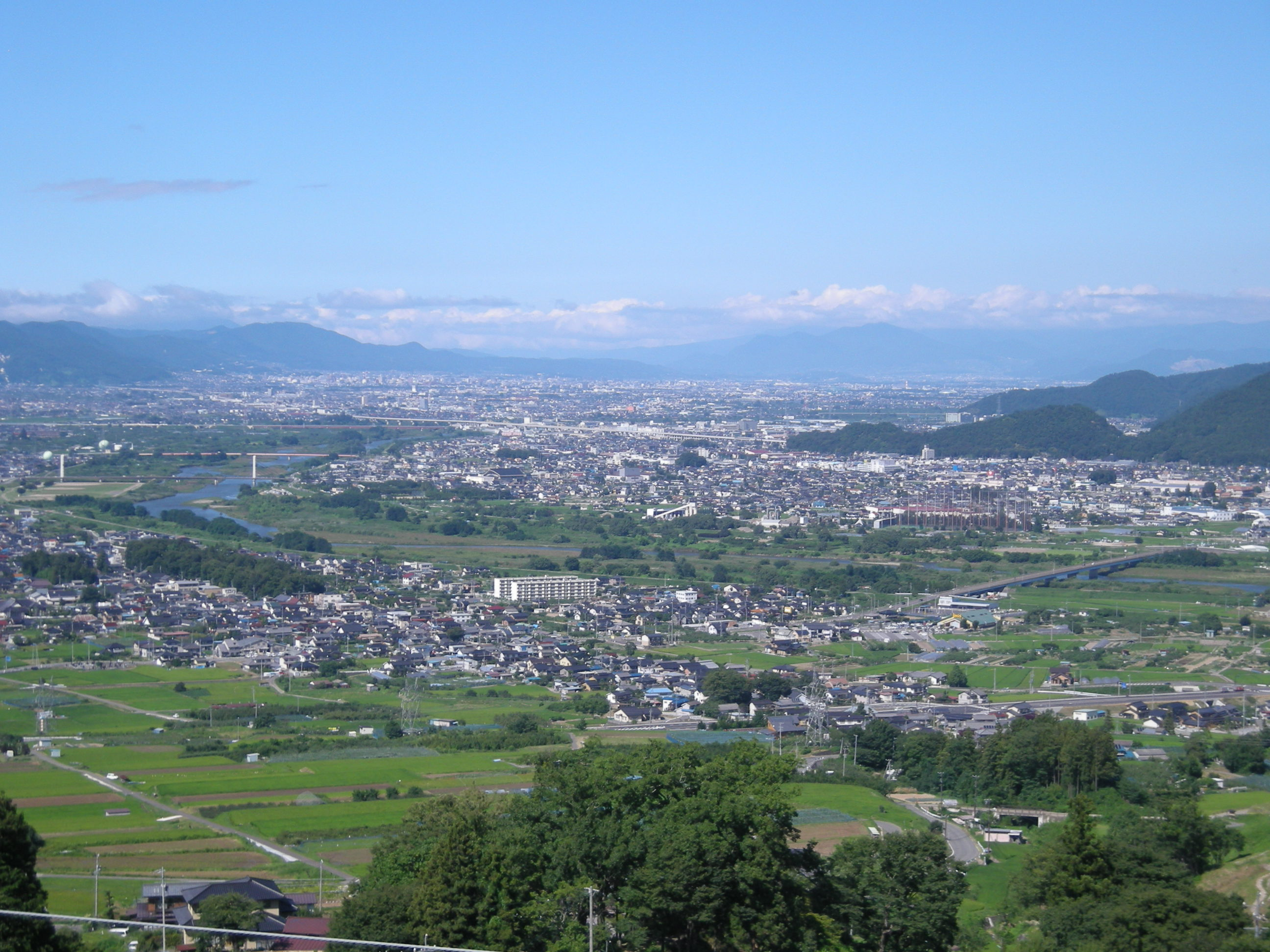
The view over the Zenkoji Plain from the station platforms

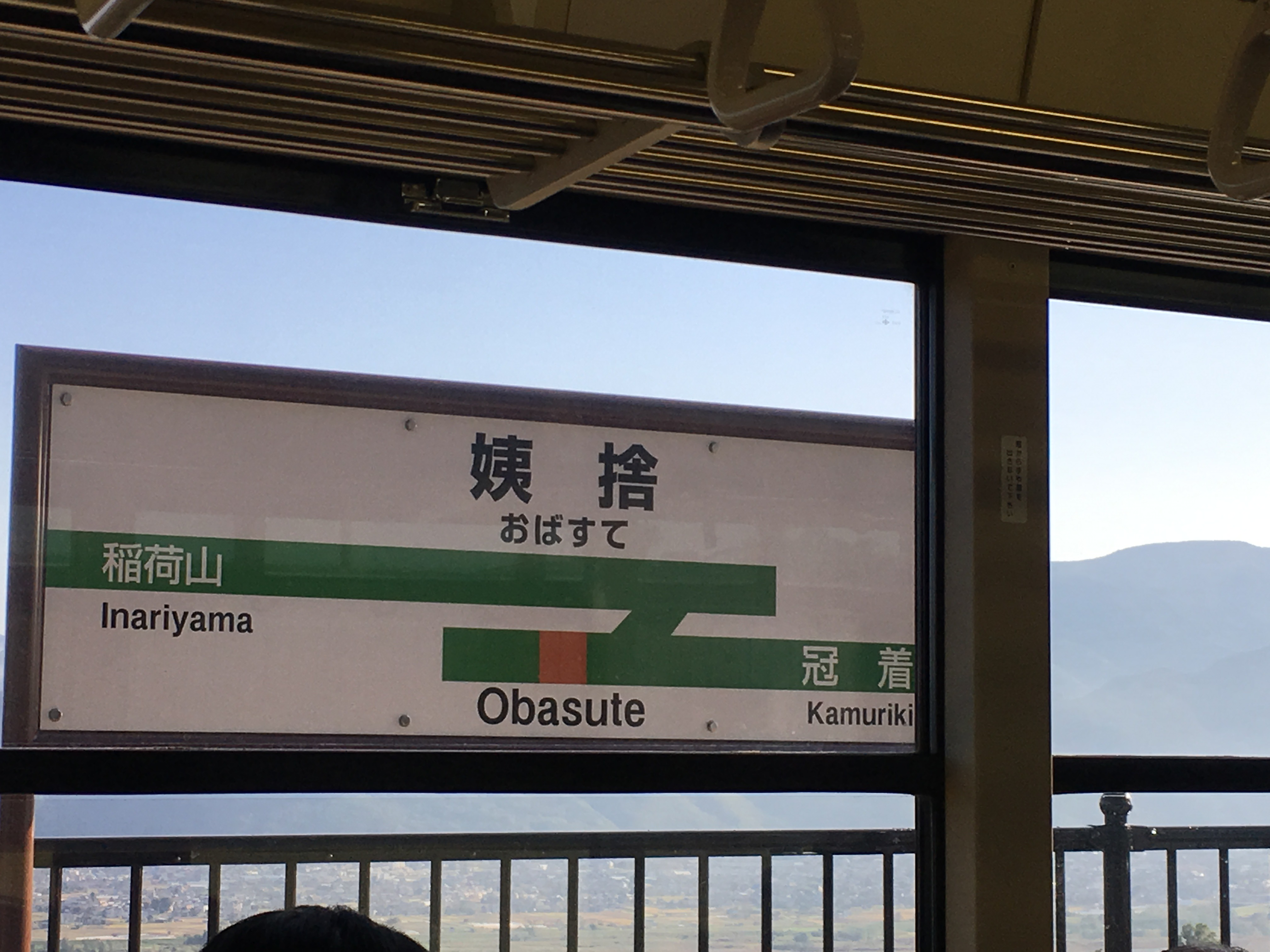
Station platform sign displaying the switchback layout

== History ==
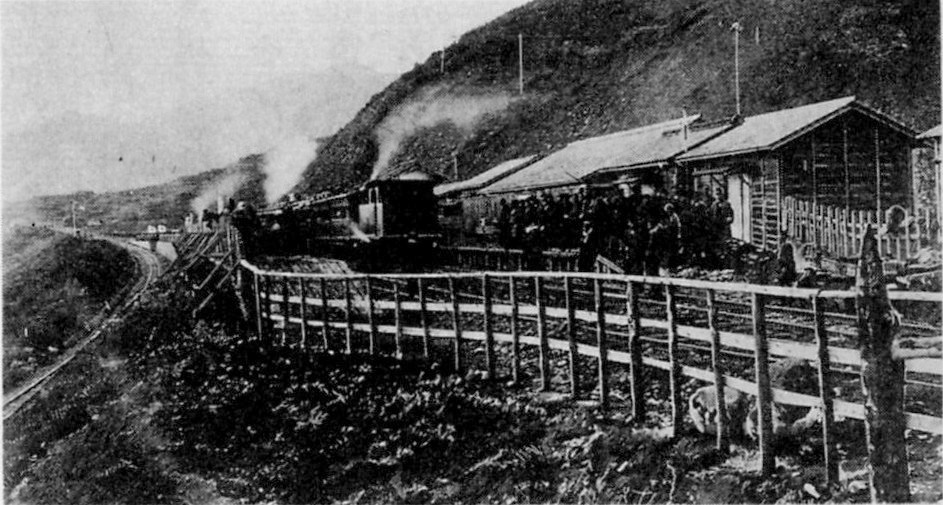
The station on its opening-day in 1900

The station opened on 1 November 1900. With the privatization of Japanese National Railways (JNR) on 1 April 1987, the station came under the control of JR East.

The station is named after nearby Mt. Ubasute, which in turn is named after the possibly mythical practice of ubasute, abandoning elderly relatives in the mountains to die.

Station numbering was introduced on the line from February 2025, with the station being assigned number SN13.

== Tourism developments ==
Although the station itself is unstaffed, local volunteers serve tea at weekends to the many tourists who visit for the express purpose of enjoying the extensive views over the Zenkoji Plain which are to be had from the northern platform. Additionally, since 2017 Obasute station has been a calling-point on the route of the luxury Shiki-Shima cruise train, which stops here overnight at the end of the first day of the spring and autumn 2-day cruises. In connection with this traffic an evening bar has been built on the station's south platform for the use of the cruise passengers and a viewing area provided on the north platform.

== Passenger statistics ==
In the fiscal year 2018, the average daily number of passengers starting their journeys at Obasute was 64.

== See also ==
- List of railway stations in Japan
