= Inariyama Station =

Railway station in Nagano, Japan

SN14 Inariyama Station 稲荷山駅
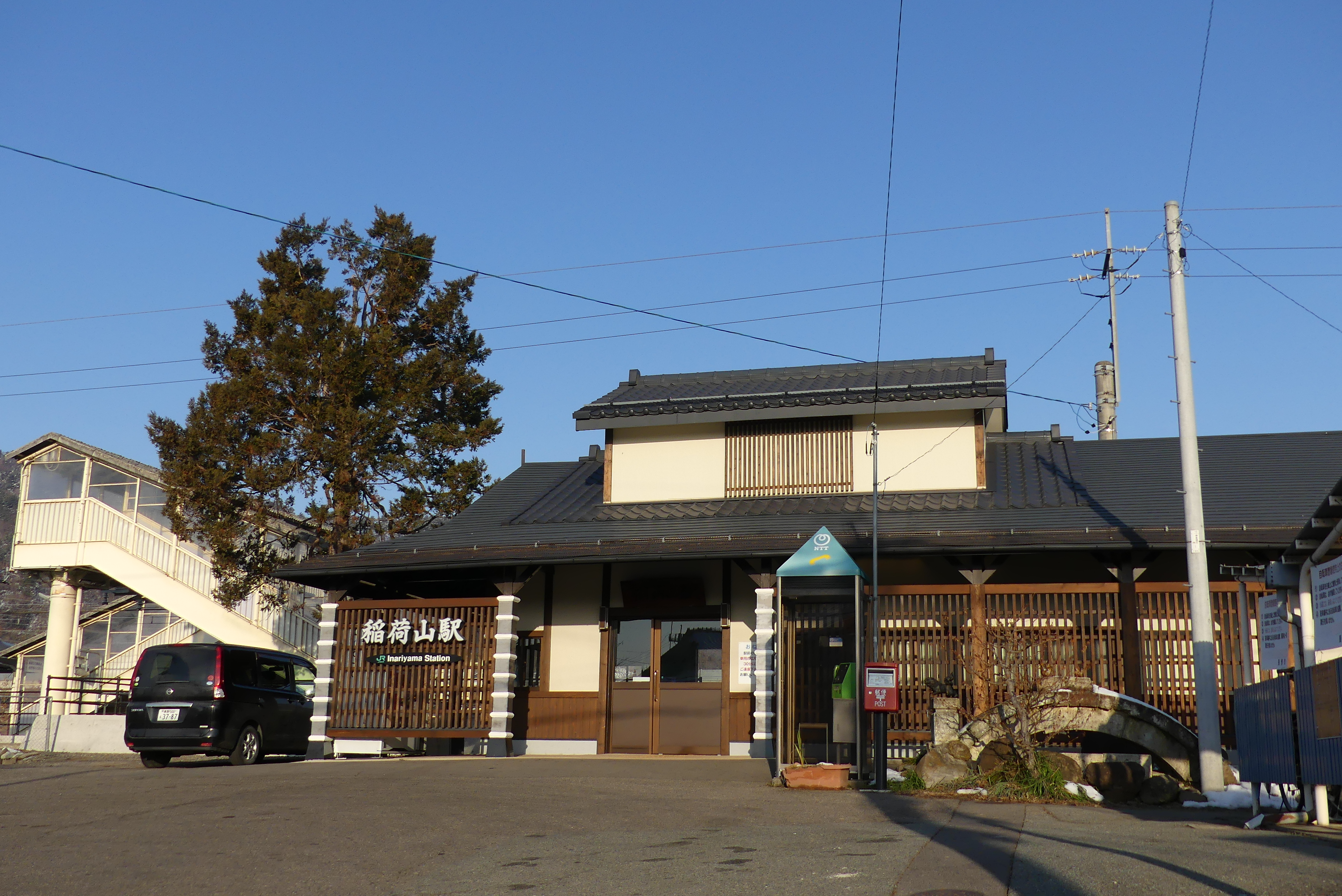
- Inariyama Station in January 2019

General information
- Location: 3768 Shinonoishiozaki, Nagano-shi, Nagano-ken 388-8014; Japan
- Coordinates: 36.5524°N 138.1080°E
- Elevation: 358.0 meters
- Operator: JR East
- Line: Shinonoi Line
- Distance: 62.3 km from Shiojiri
- Platforms: 2 side platforms

Other information
- Station code: SN14
- Website: Official website

History
- Opened: 11 November 1900

Passengers
- FY2015: 358 daily

Services
Preceding station	JR East	Following station
Obasute SN13 (limited service) towards Shiojiri	Shinonoi Line Rapid (limited service)	Shinonoi SN15 Terminus
Obasute SN13 towards Shiojiri	Shinonoi Line Local & Rapid Misuzu	Shinonoi SN15 Terminus
Location
- Location within Nagano Prefecture Location within Japan

Inariyama Station (稲荷山駅, Inariyama-eki) is a train station on the Shinonoi Line in the city of Nagano, Nagano Prefecture, Japan, operated by East Japan Railway Company (JR East).

== Lines ==
Inariyama Station is served by the Shinonoi Line and is 62.3 kilometers from the starting point of the line at Shiojiri Station.

== Station layout ==
The station consists of two ground-level side platforms, connected to the station building by a footbridge. The station is a Kan'i itaku station.

=== Platforms ===
1	■ Shinonoi Line	for Matsumoto and Shiojiri
2	■ Shinonoi Line	for Shinonoi and Nagano

== History ==
Inariyama Station opened on 1 November 1900. With the privatization of Japanese National Railways (JNR) on 1 April 1987, the station came under the control of JR East. Station numbering was introduced on the line from February 2025, with the station being assigned number SN14.

== Passenger statistics ==
In fiscal 2015, the station was used by an average of 358 passengers daily (boarding passengers only).

== Surrounding area ==
- Hase-dera
- Inariyama-juku

== See also ==
- List of railway stations in Japan
