= Hirooka =

Hirooka (written: 広岡 or 廣岡) is a Japanese surname. Notable people with the surname include:

- Asako Hirooka (広岡 浅子, 1849–1919), Japanese businesswoman, banker and college founder
- Taishi Hirooka (廣岡 大志, born 1997), Japanese baseball player
- Tatsuro Hirooka (広岡 達朗, born 1932), Japanese baseball player

== See also ==
- Hirooka Station, a railway station in Shiojiri, Nagano Prefecture, Japan
