= 西条駅 =

西条駅 is the name of multiple train stations in Japan:

- Nishijō Station
- Saijō Station
