= Obasute =

Obasute may refer to:

- Ubasute, the alleged former Japanese practice of abandoning the elderly to die
- Obasute Station, a railway station in Japan
