= Shinonoi Line =

Railway line in Nagano prefecture, Japan

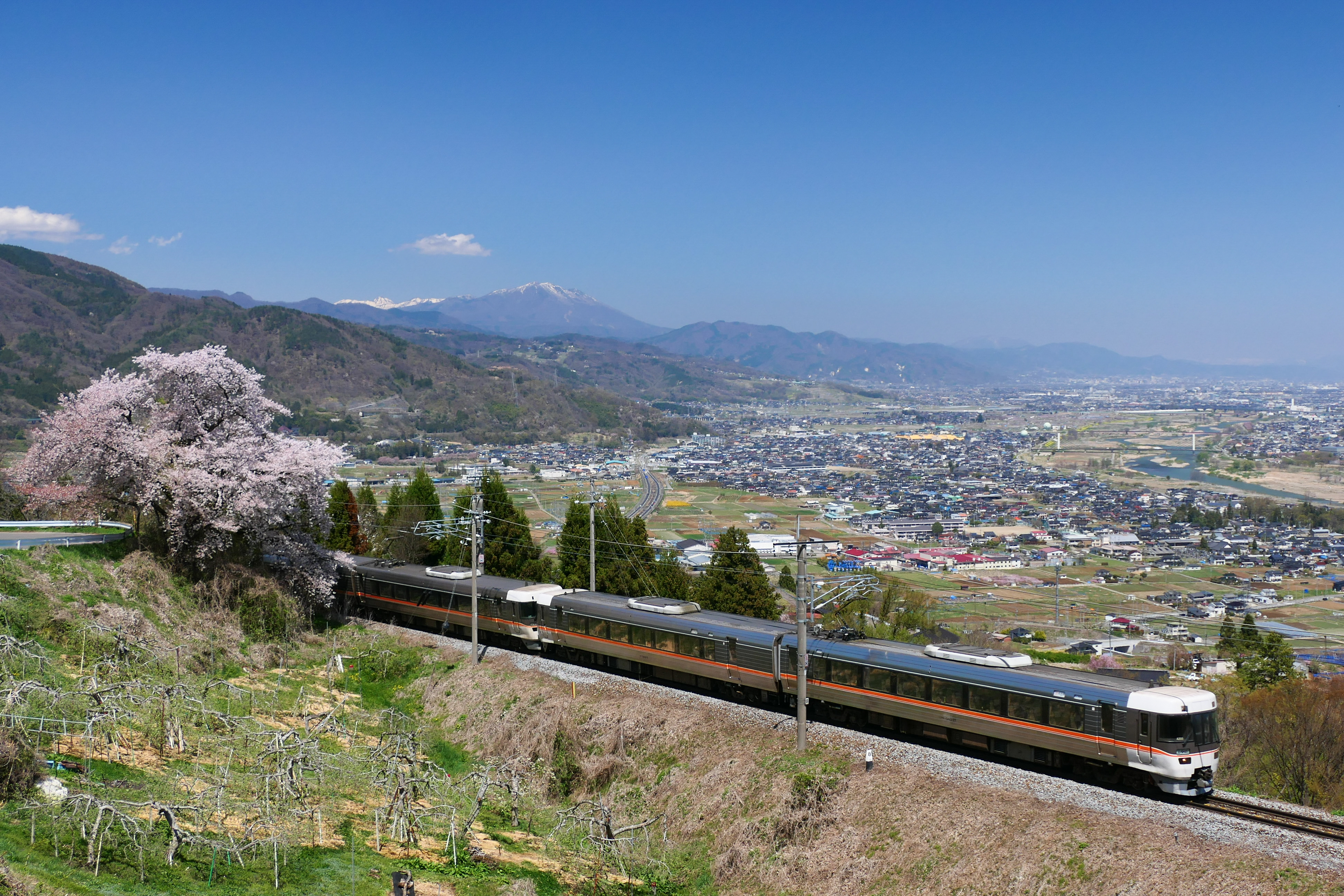
- Limited express Shinano running on the Shinonoi line in April 2022

Overview
- Native name: 篠ノ井線
- Owner: JR East
- Locale: Nagano Prefecture
- Termini: Shinonoi; Shiojiri
- Stations: 15

Service
- Type: Heavy rail

History
- Opened: November 1, 1900; 125 years ago

Technical
- Line length: 66.7 km (41.4 mi)
- Track gauge: 1,067 mm (3 ft 6 in)
- Electrification: 1,500 V DC overhead catenary
- Operating speed: 130 km/h (80 mph)
Route map

The Shinonoi Line (篠ノ井線, Shinonoi-sen) is a railway line in Nagano Prefecture, Japan, operated by the East Japan Railway Company (JR East). It connects Shinonoi Station in Nagano with Shiojiri Station in Shiojiri.

The line is a corridor between the Shinetsu Main Line and the Chūō Main Line. All the limited express trains on the Shinonoi Line come from the Chūō Main Line: Azusa from Tokyo and Shinano from Nagoya.

== Stations ==
All stations are located in Nagano Prefecture.

●: All trains stop, ▲: Some trains stop, ｜: non-stop, Rapid Misuzu stops at all stations

Line name	No.	Station	Japanese	Distance (km)	Rapid	Transfers	Location
Shinonoi Line	SN01	Shiojiri	塩尻	0.0	●	Chūō Main Line	Shiojiri
Shinonoi Line	SN02	Hirooka	広丘	3.8	●		Shiojiri
Shinonoi Line	SN03	Murai	村井	6.8	●		Matsumoto
Shinonoi Line	SN04	Hirata	平田	8.8	●		Matsumoto
Shinonoi Line	SN05	Minami-Matsumoto	南松本	10.9	●		Matsumoto
Shinonoi Line	SN06	Matsumoto	松本	13.3	●	■ Ōito Line; ■ Alpico Kōtsū Kamikōchi Line	Matsumoto
Shinonoi Line	SN07	Tazawa	田沢	21.6	●		Azumino
Shinonoi Line	SN08	Akashina	明科	28.2	●		Azumino
Shinonoi Line	SN09	Nishijō	西条	37.2	▲		Chikuhoku, Higashichikuma District
Shinonoi Line	SN10	Sakakita	坂北	40.9	▲		Chikuhoku, Higashichikuma District
Shinonoi Line	SN11	Hijiri-Kōgen	聖高原	45.0	●		Omi, Higashichikuma District
Shinonoi Line	SN12	Kamuriki	冠着	48.3	▲		Chikuhoku, Higashichikuma District
Shinonoi Line	SN13	Obasute	姨捨	54.2	▲		Chikuma
Shinonoi Line	SN14	Inariyama	稲荷山	62.9	▲		Nagano
Shinonoi Line	SN15	Shinonoi	篠ノ井	66.7	●	Shinano Railway Line	Nagano
Shin'etsu Main Line	SE09	Shinonoi	篠ノ井	66.7	●	Shinano Railway Line	Nagano
Shin'etsu Main Line	SE10	Imai	今井	68.8	｜		Nagano
Shin'etsu Main Line	SE11	Kawanakajima	川中島	71.0	▲		Nagano
Shin'etsu Main Line	SE12	Amori	安茂里	73.1	｜		Nagano
Shin'etsu Main Line	SE13	Nagano	長野	76.0	●	Hokuriku Shinkansen; Shinano Railway Kita-Shinano Line; ■ Iiyama Line (Note: Although the official terminus of the Iiyama Line is at Toyono, trains on the line run through to Nagano.); Nagano Electric Railway	Nagano

=== Passing loops and switchbacks ===
==== Hirase loop ====
A passing loop is located in Azumino, known as Hirase shingōjō (平瀬信号場). It has two tracks.

- Coordinates:36°15′47″N 137°56′54″E

==== Haneo switchback ====
A switchback is located in Azumino, known as Haneo shingōjō (羽尾信号場)

- Coordinates: 36°29′08″N 138°05′55″E

==== Kuwanohara switchback ====
A switchback is located in Azumino, known as Kuwanohara shingōjō (桑ノ原信号場)

- Coordinates: 36°31′20″N 138°04′40″E
Hirase loop (A: to Matsumoto, B: to Tazawa)

Haneo switchback (A: to Kamuriki (uphill), B: to Obasute)

Kuwanohara switchback (A: to Obasute (uphill), B: to Inariyama)

== Rolling stock ==
=== Limited express ===
- E353 series EMU (Azusa, Kaiji)
- 383 series EMU (Wide View Shinano)

=== Local ===
- E127 series EMU
- 211 series EMU
- 313 series EMU

=== Former rolling stock ===
- 115 series EMU
- 123 series EMU
- 381 series EMU (Shinano)
- E257 series EMU (Azusa, Kaiji)
- E351 series EMU (Super Azusa)

== History ==
The Shinonoi to Nishijo section opened in 1900, and was extended via Matsumoto to Shiojiri in 1902.

The Shiojiri to Matsumoto section was double-tracked between 1961 and 1965, with the Tazawa to Akashina section double-tracked in 1966. The Akashina to Nishijo section was also double-tracked, but the original line was decommissioned in 1988.

The Shiojiri to Matsumoto section was electrified in 1964/5, and extended to Shinonoi in 1973, CTC signalling being commissioned on the entire line the previous year.

Station numbering was introduced on the Nagano area from February 2025, with Shinonoi Line stations numbered using the prefix "SN". Numbers increase towards Shinonoi.

=== Former connecting lines ===
- Matsumoto Station: The Chikuma Electric Railway opened a 5 km line, electrified at 600 V DC, to Asama Onsen in 1924. In 1958 the voltage was raised to 750 V DC, but the line closed in 1964.
