= Hirooka Station =

Railway station in Shiojiri, Nagano Prefecture, Japan

SN02 Hirooka Station 広丘駅
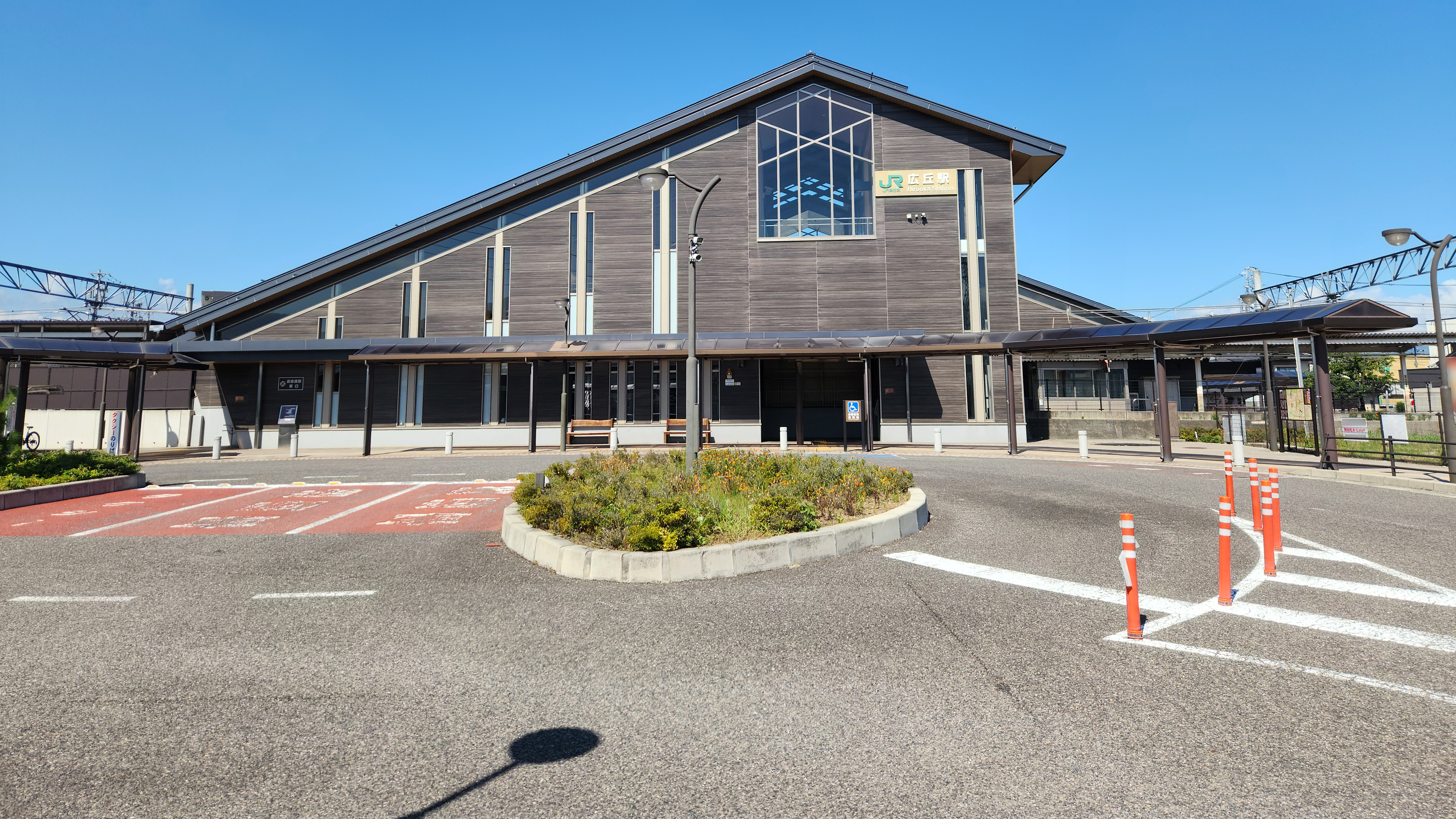
- East entrance to Hirooka Station in August 2024

General information
- Location: 1640 Hirooka-Nomura, Shiojiri-shi, Nagano-ken 399-0702; Japan
- Coordinates: 36°8′53.76″N 137°56′58.46″E
- Elevation: 664.5 meters
- Operator: JR East
- Line: Shinonoi Line
- Distance: 3.8 km from Shiojiri
- Platforms: 2 side platforms

Other information
- Status: Staffed (Midori no Madoguchi)
- Station code: SN02
- Website: Official website

History
- Opened: 10 July 1933

Passengers
- FY2015: 2552 (daily)

Services
Preceding station	JR East	Following station
Shiojiri SN01 Terminus	Shinonoi Line Rapid; Local & Rapid Misuzu	Murai SN03 towards Shinonoi
Location
- Location within Nagano Prefecture Location within Japan

Hirooka Station (広丘駅, Hirooka-eki) is a train station in the city of Shiojiri, Nagano Prefecture, Japan, operated by East Japan Railway Company (JR East).

== Lines ==
Hirooka Station is served by the Shinonoi Line and is 3.8 kilometers from the terminus of the line at Shiojiri Station. Many trains of the Chūō Main Line continue past the nominal intermediate terminus of the line at Shiojiri and continue on to Matsumoto via this station.

== Station layout ==
The station consists of two opposed ground-level side platforms, connected to the station building by a footbridge. The station has a Midori no Madoguchi staffed ticket office.

=== Platforms ===
1	■ Shinonoi Line	for Matsumoto
2	■ Shinonoi Line	for Shiojiri

== History ==
Hirooka Station opened on 10 July 1933. With the privatization of Japanese National Railways (JNR) on 1 April 1987, the station came under the control of JR East. Station numbering was introduced on the line from February 2025, with the station being assigned number SN02.

== Passenger statistics ==
In fiscal 2015, the station was used by an average of 2552 passengers daily (boarding passengers only).

== Surrounding area ==
- National Route 19

== See also ==
- List of railway stations in Japan
