= Nagano Station =

Railway station in Nagano, Nagano Prefecture, Japan

SE13 Nagano Station 長野駅
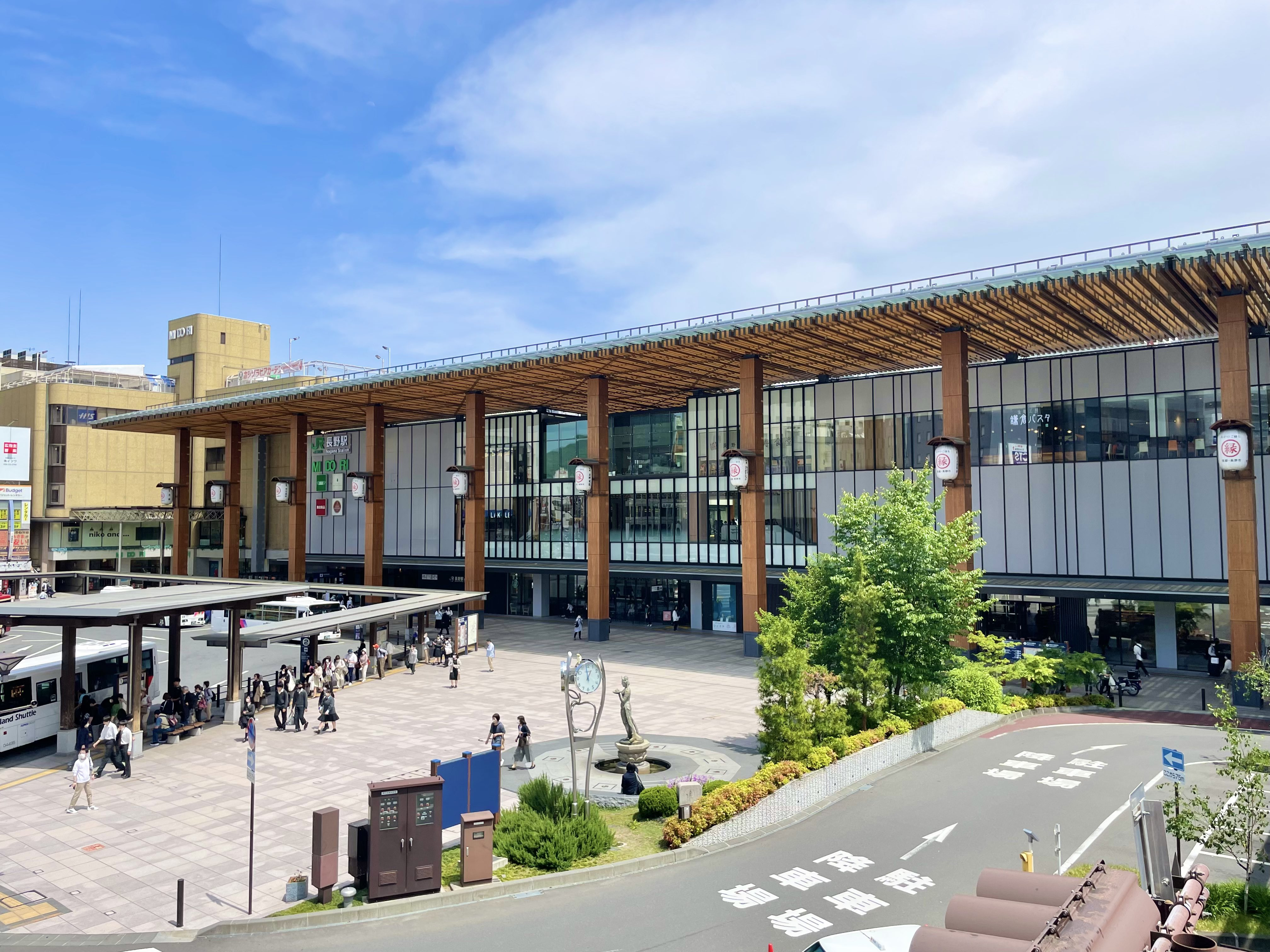
- Nagano Station, Zenkoji-guchi Entrance

General information
- Location: Kurita; Nagano; Japan
- Coordinates: 36°38′35″N 138°11′17″E
- Elevation: 361 m (1,184 ft)
- Operator: JR East; Shinano Railway; Nagano Electric Railway
- Lines: Hokuriku Shinkansen; Shin'etsu Main Line; Kita-Shinano Line; Nagano Electric Railway Nagano Line
- Platforms: 7 island platforms
- Connections: Bus stop

Other information
- Station code: N1 (Nagano Electric Railway)

History
- Opened: 1 May 1888; 138 years ago

Passengers
- JFY2015: 21,168 daily (JR East); 5,251 daily (Nagano Electric Railway)

Services
Preceding station	JR East	Following station
Ōmiya towards Tokyo	Hokuriku Shinkansen Kagayaki	through to JR West
Ueda towards Tokyo	Hokuriku Shinkansen Hakutaka	Iiyama towards Jōetsumyōkō
Ueda towards Tokyo	Hokuriku Shinkansen Asama	Terminus
Shinonoi towards Shiojiri	Shinano	Terminus
Amori SE12 towards Shinonoi	Shin'etsu Main Line Shinonoi – Nagano	Terminus
Akashina One-way operation	Shinonoi Line Good Morning Liner	Terminus
Kawanakajima SE11 (limited service) towards Shiojiri	Shinonoi Line Rapid	Terminus
Amori SE12 towards Shiojiri	Shinonoi Line Local & Rapid Misuzu	Terminus
Terminus	Iiyama Line	Kita-Nagano towards Echigo-Kawaguchi
Preceding station	JR West	Following station
through to JR East	Hokuriku Shinkansen Kagayaki	Toyama towards Tsuruga
Preceding station	Shinano Railway	Following station
Kawanakajima towards Karuizawa	Shinano Railway Line Rapid	Terminus
Amori towards Karuizawa	Shinano Railway Line Local	Terminus
Terminus	Kita-Shinano Line	Kita-Nagano towards Myoko-Kogen
Preceding station	Nagano Electric Railway	Following station
Terminus	Nagano Line A limited express	Gondō N3 towards Yudanaka
Terminus	Nagano Line B limited express Local	Shiyakushomae N2 towards Yudanaka
Location
- Location within Japan

Nagano Station (Japanese: 長野駅, Hepburn: Nagano-eki) is a railway station in the city of Nagano in Nagano Prefecture, Japan. The station is operated by East Japan Railway Company (JR East) and the private railway operator Nagano Electric Railway (Nagaden).

== Lines ==
Nagano Station is served by the following lines.

- JR East
  - Hokuriku Shinkansen (branded "Nagano Shinkansen" until March 2015), on which it is 222.4 kilometers from Tokyo Station
  - Shinetsu Main Line
  - Shinonoi Line
  - Iiyama Line
- Shinano Railway Line
- Nagano Electric Railway Nagano Line

== Station layout ==
The JR East portion of the station has two elevated island platforms for the Shinkansen services, and three ground-level island platforms for local services, including onward services by Kita-Shinano Line trains. The station has a "Midori no Madoguchi" staffed ticket office.

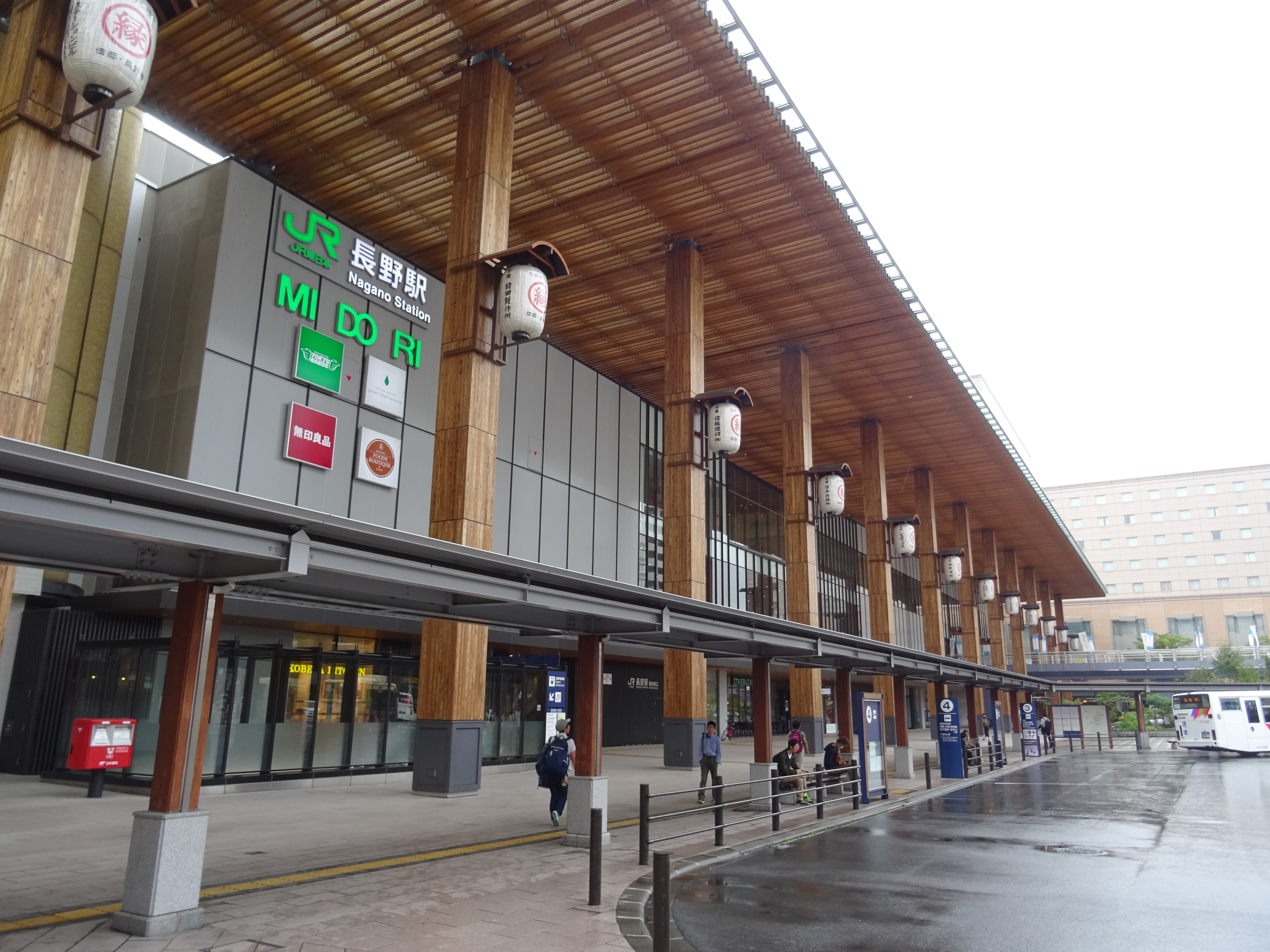
Nagano Station Zenkoji Entrance

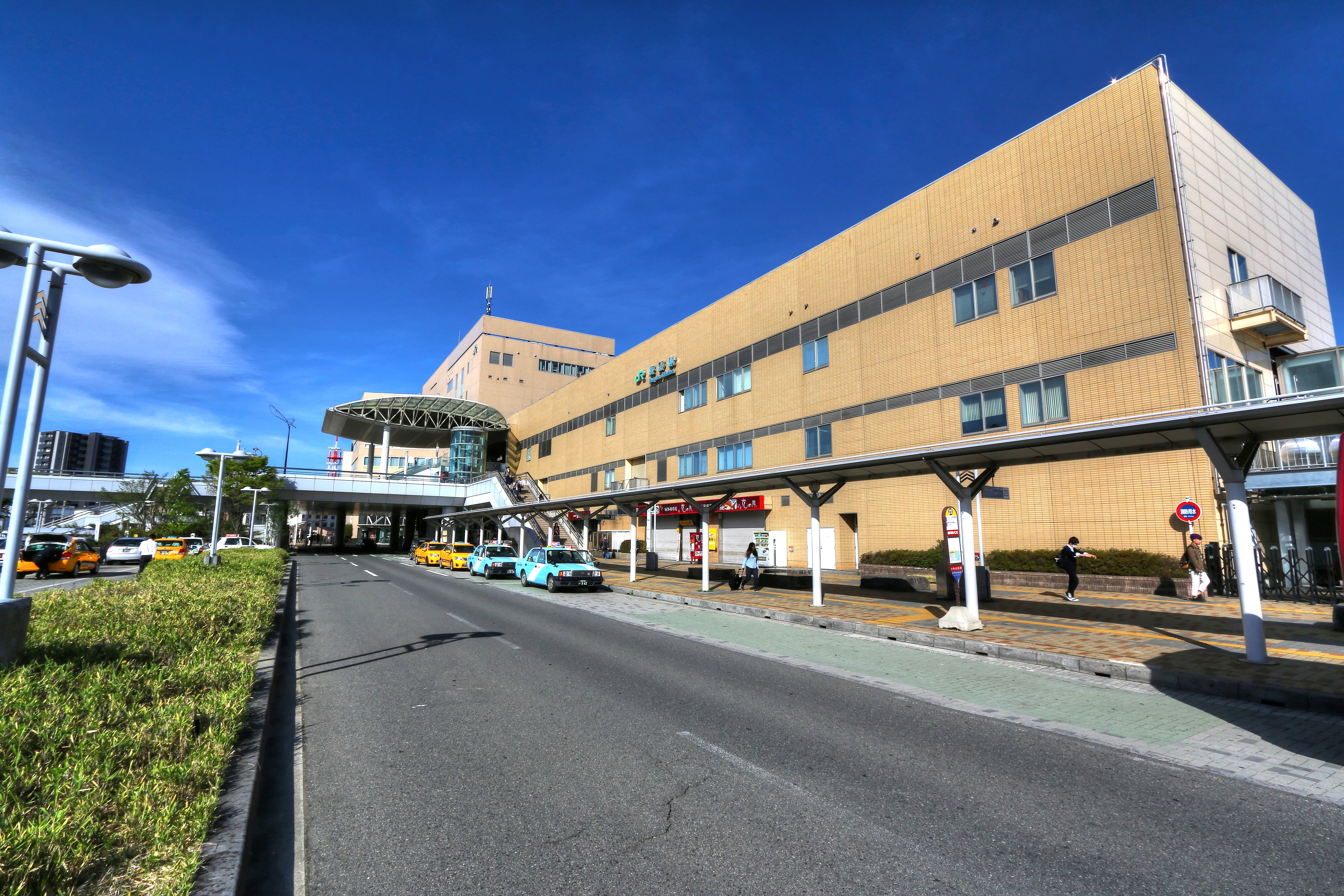
Nagano Station East Entrance

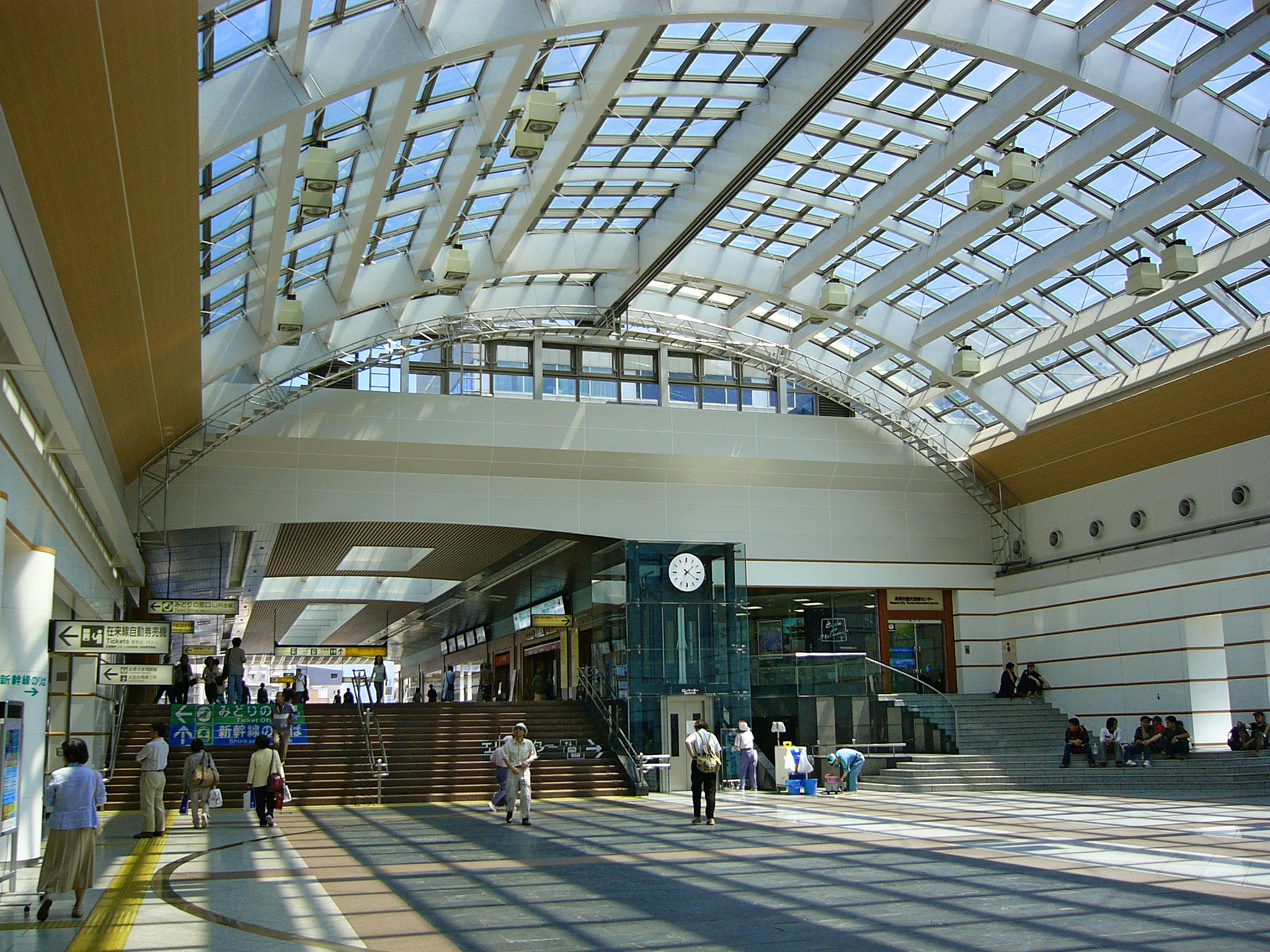
Concourse of JR station

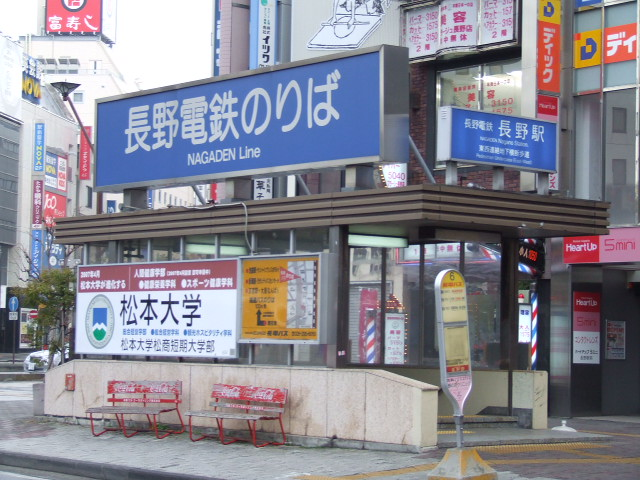
Entrance of Nagano Electric Railway (Nagaden)

=== JR East ===
2	■ Shinetsu Main Line	for Toyono, Myōkō-Kōgen, and Naoetsu for Amori and Shinonoi
2	■ Shinonoi Line & Chūō Main Line	for Shinonoi, Akashina, Matsumoto, Shiojiri, Kami-Suwa, and Kōfu
2	■ Shinano Railway Line	for Shinonoi, Ueda, Komoro, and Karuizawa
3	■ Shinetsu Main Line	for Amori and Shinonoi
3	■ Shinonoi Line & Chūō Main Line	for Shinonoi, Akashina, Matsumoto, Shiojiri, Kami-Suwa, and Kōfu
3	■ Shinano Railway Line	for Shinonoi, Ueda, Komoro, and Karuizawa
4	■ Iiyama Line	for Toyono, Iiyama, Togari-Nozawaonsen, Tōkamachi, and Echigo-Kawaguchi
5	■ Shinetsu Main Line	for Toyono, Myōkō-Kōgen, and Naoetsu for Amori and Shinonoi
5	■ Shinonoi Line & Chūō Main Line	for Shinonoi, Akashina, Matsumoto, Shiojiri, Kami-Suwa, and Kōfu
5	■ Shinano Railway Line	for Shinonoi, Ueda, Komoro, and Karuizawa
6	■ Ltd. Exp. Shinano	for Shinonoi, Matsumoto and Nagoya
6	■ Shinetsu Main Line	for Toyono, Myōkō-Kōgen, and Naoetsu for Amori and Shinonoi
6	■ Shinonoi Line & Chūō Main Line	for Shinonoi, Akashina, Matsumoto, Shiojiri, Kami-Suwa, and Kōfu
6	■ Shinano Railway Line	for Shinonoi, Ueda, Komoro, and Karuizawa
7	■ Shinetsu Main Line	for Toyono, Myōkō-Kōgen, and Naoetsu for Amori and Shinonoi
7	■ Shinonoi Line & Chūō Main Line	for Shinonoi, Akashina, Matsumoto, Shiojiri, Kami-Suwa, and Kōfu
7	■ Shinano Railway Line	for Shinonoi, Ueda, Komoro, and Karuizawa
11-14	■ Hokuriku Shinkansen	for Toyama, Kanazawa, Fukui and Tsuruga for Karuizawa, Takasaki, Ōmiya, and Tokyo

The Shinkansen platforms have used the tune "Shinano no Kuni" (the Nagano prefectural song) for the departure melody since January 2015.

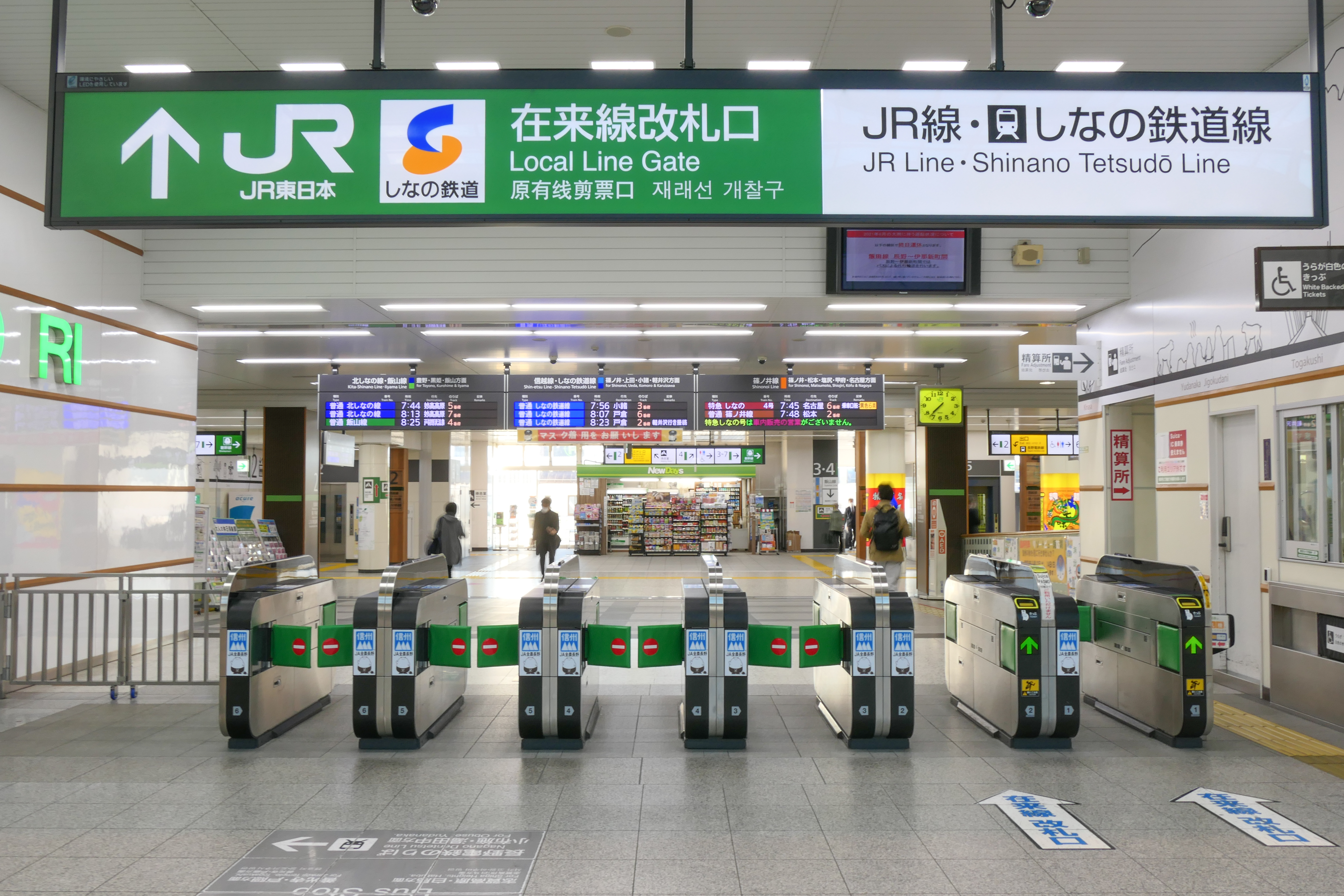
local line Ticket gate, October 2021

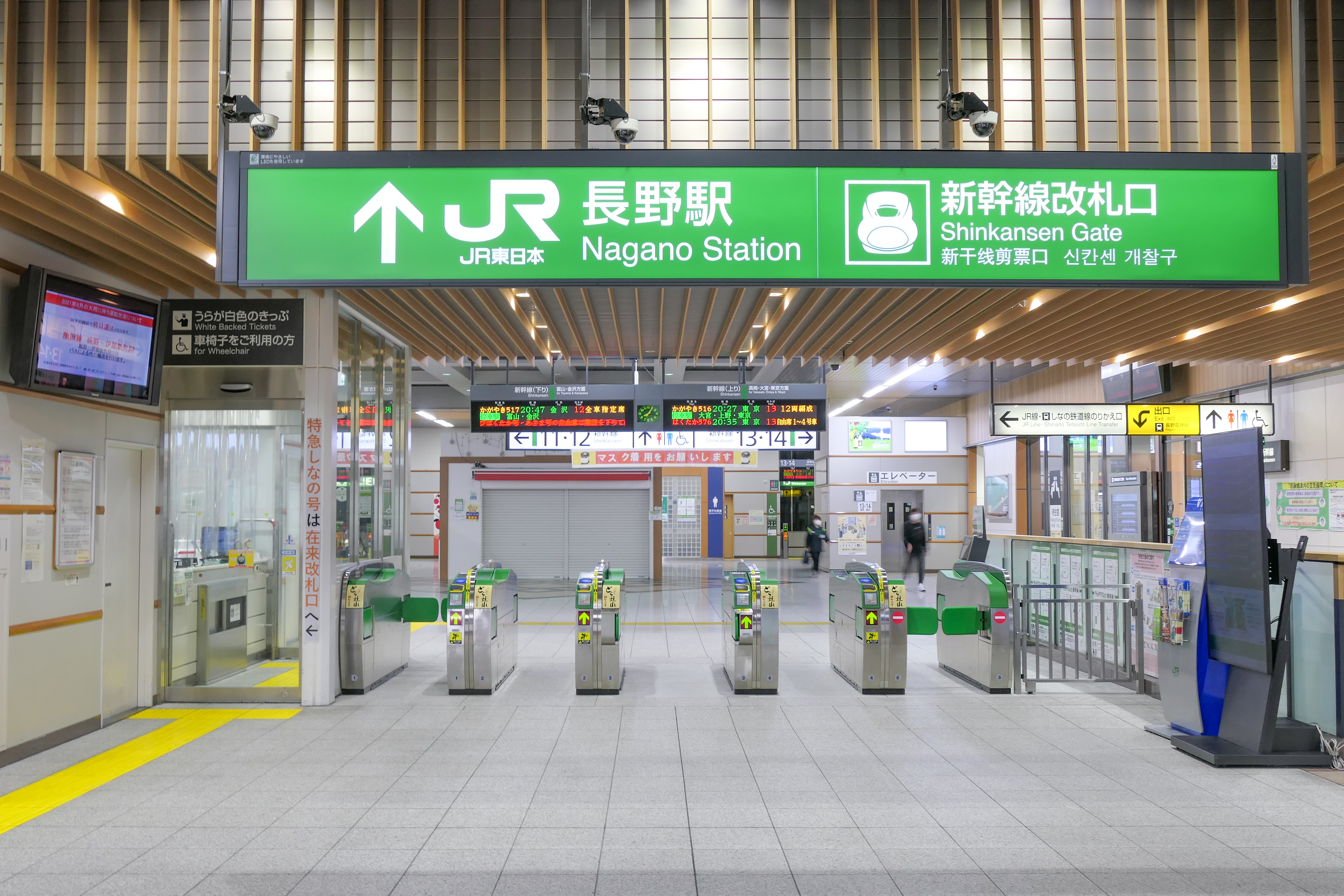
Shinkansen Ticket gate, October 2021

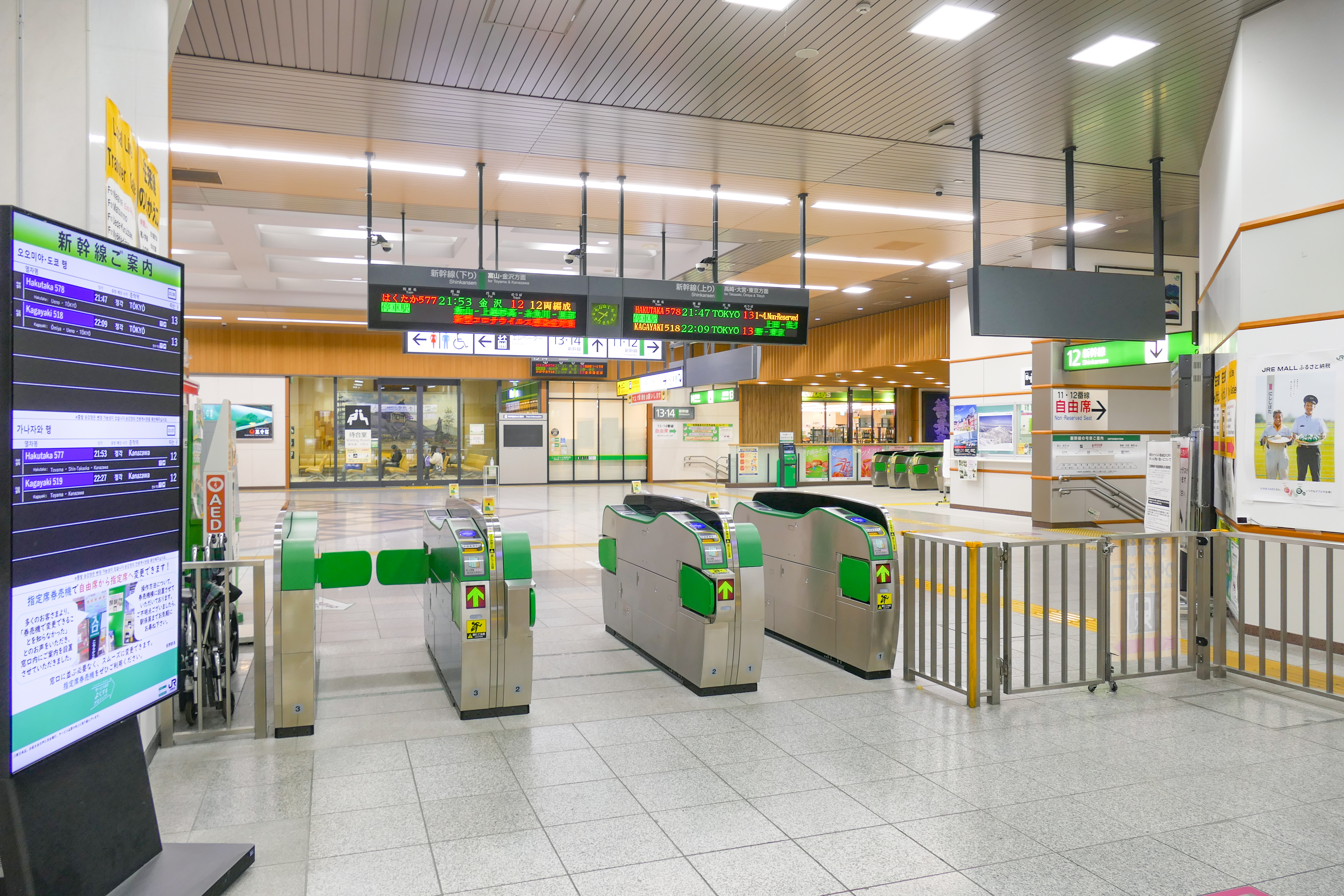
Transfer Ticket gate, January 2022

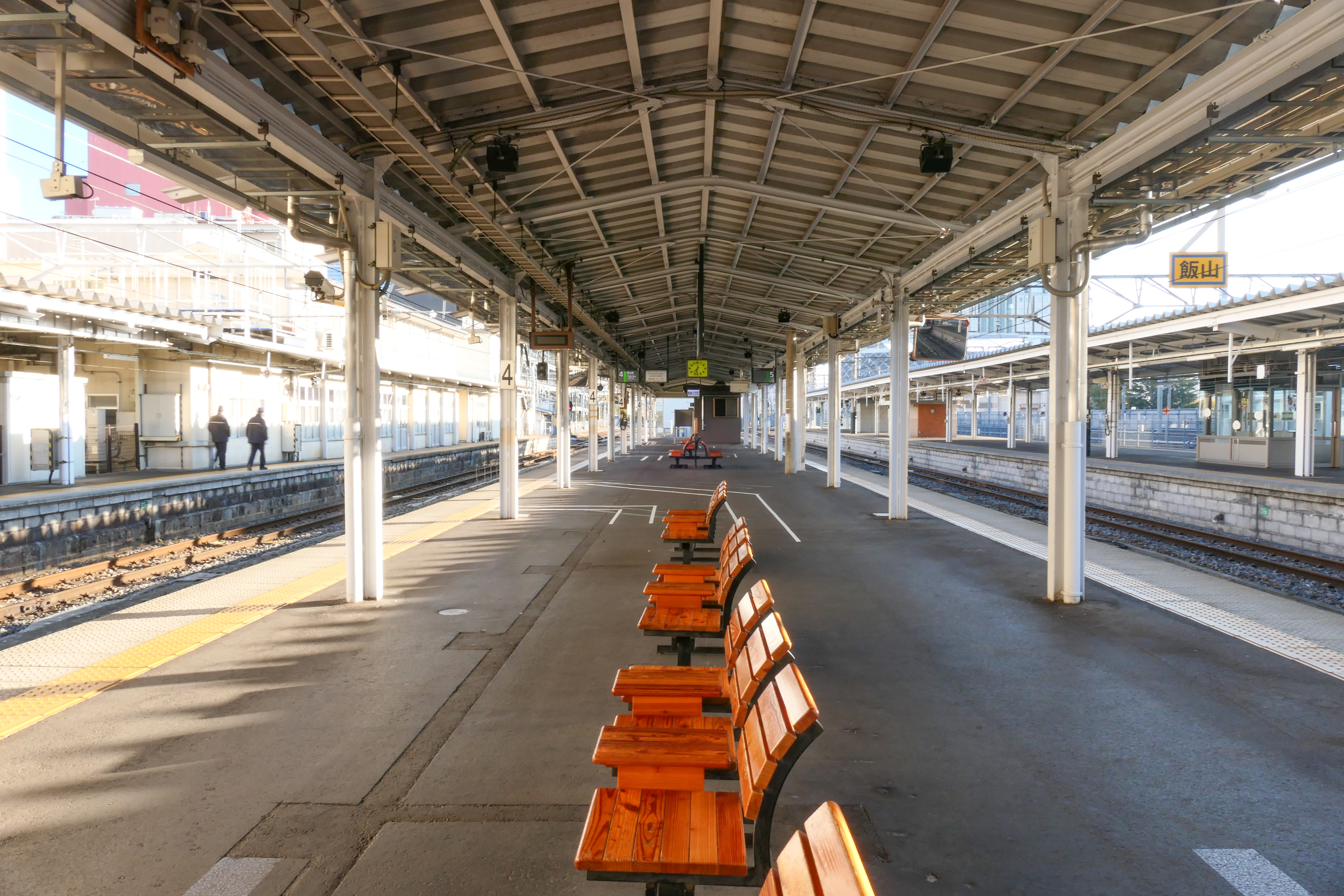
local line Platforms, October 2021

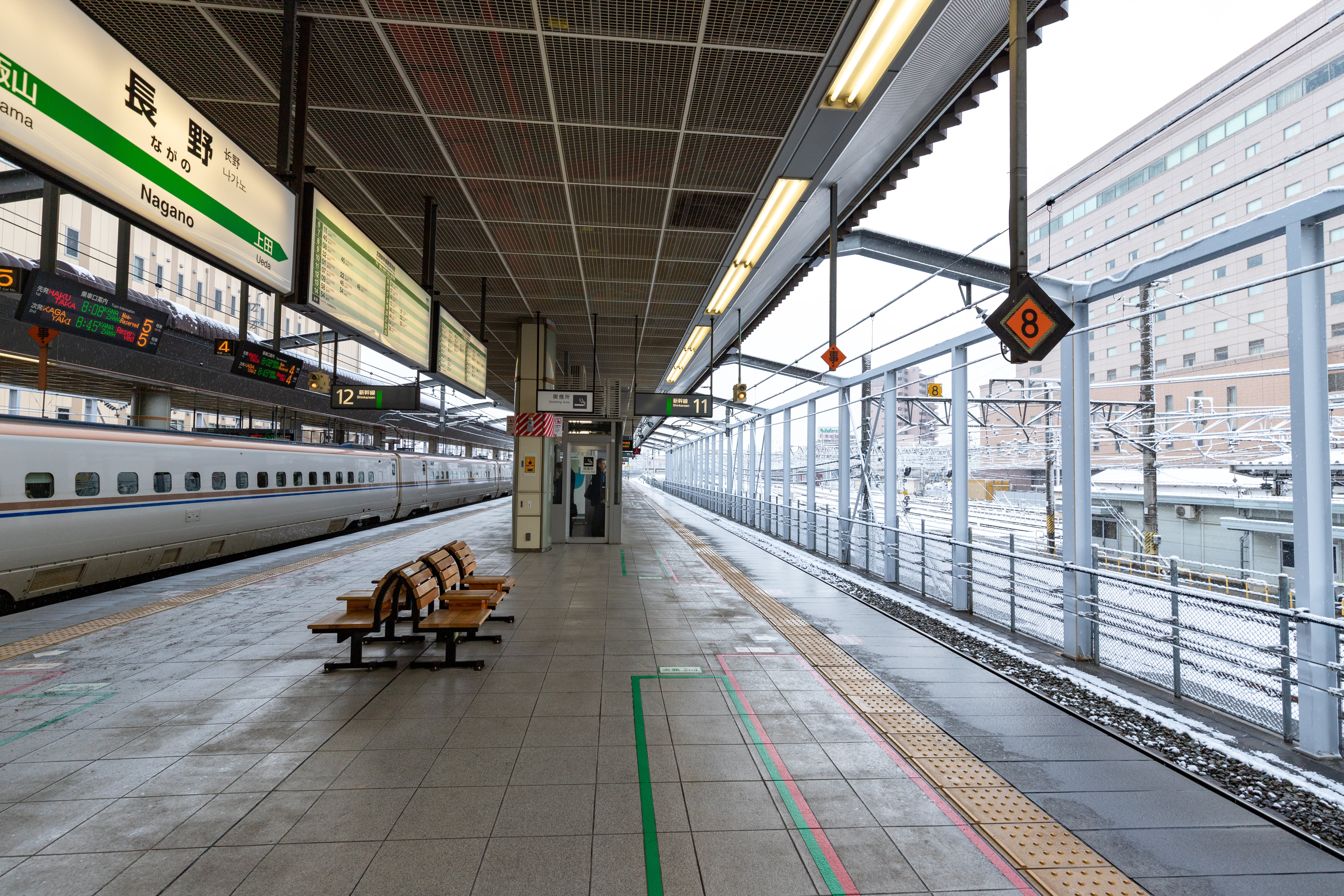
Shinkansen Platforms, March 2019

=== Nagano Electric Railway ===
The Nagano Electric Railway platforms are located underground below the JR platforms. The Nagano Electric Railway has two island platforms serving three tracks.

1	■ Nagano Line	for Suzaka, Obuse, Shinshū-Nakano, and Yudanaka (Local trains)
2	■ Nagano Line	for Suzaka, Obuse, Shinshū-Nakano, and Yudanaka (Limited express trains)
3	■ Nagano Line	for Suzaka, Obuse, Shinshū-Nakano, and Yudanaka (Local trains)

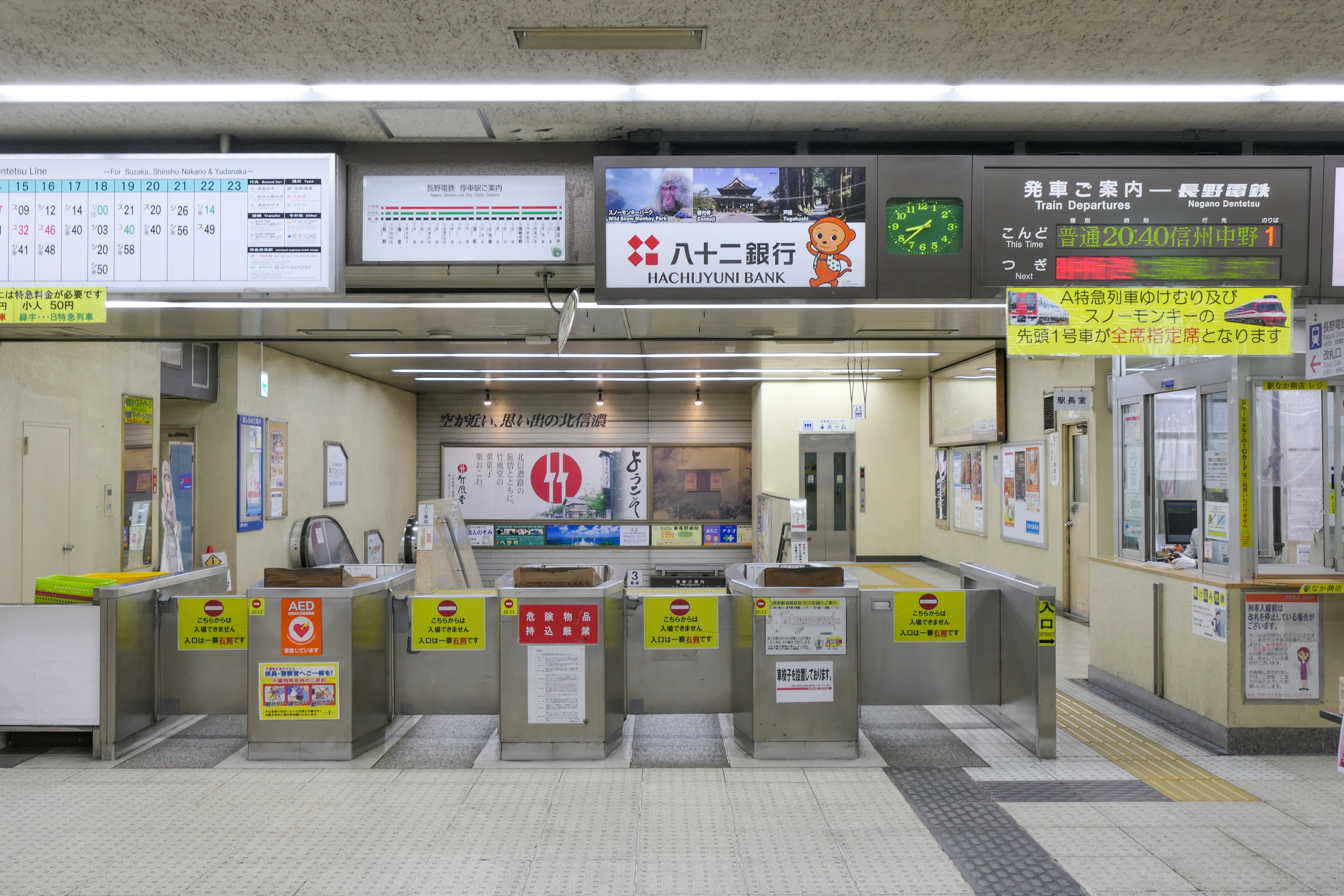
Ticket gate, October 2021

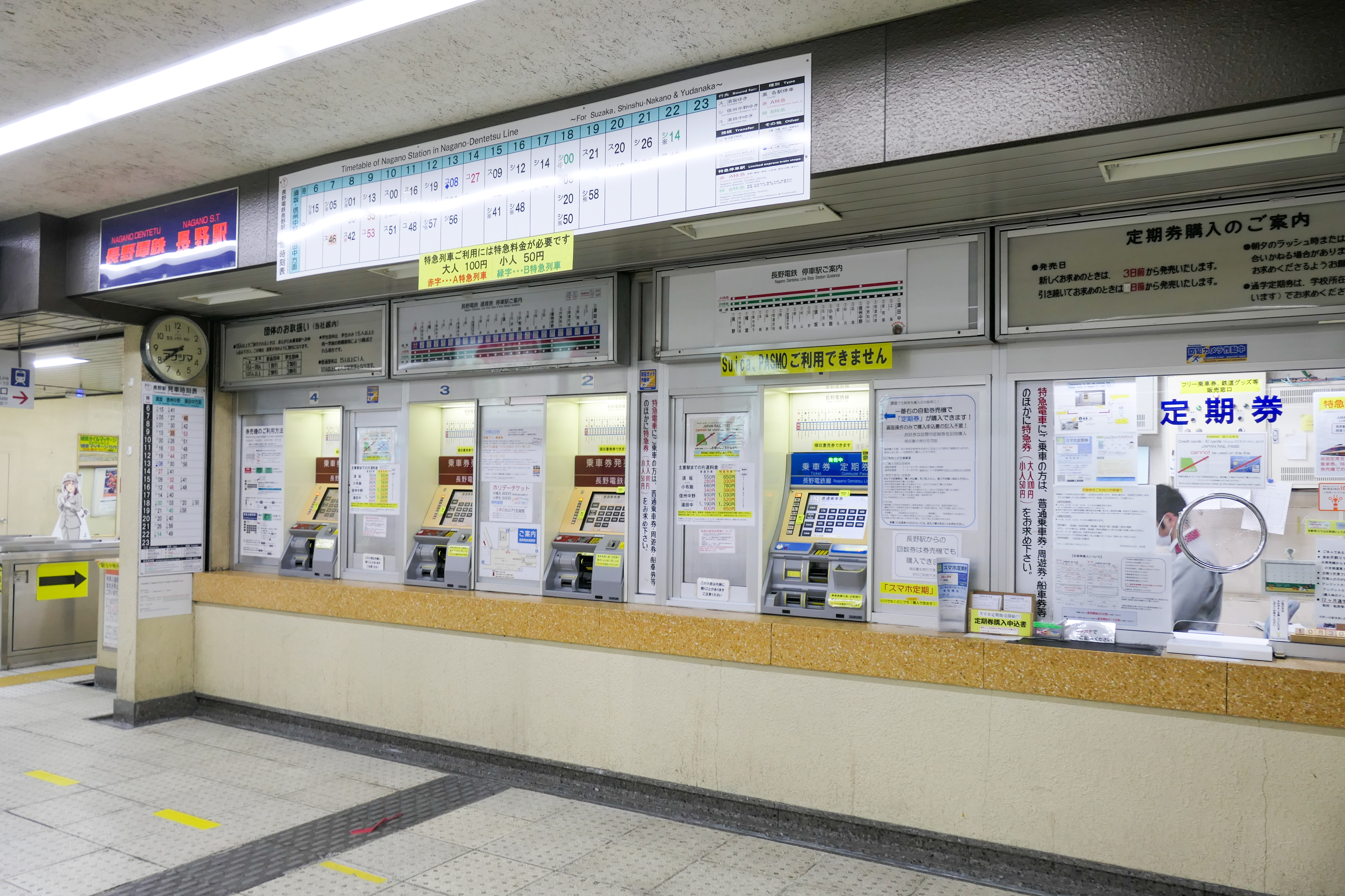
Ticket vending machines, October 2021

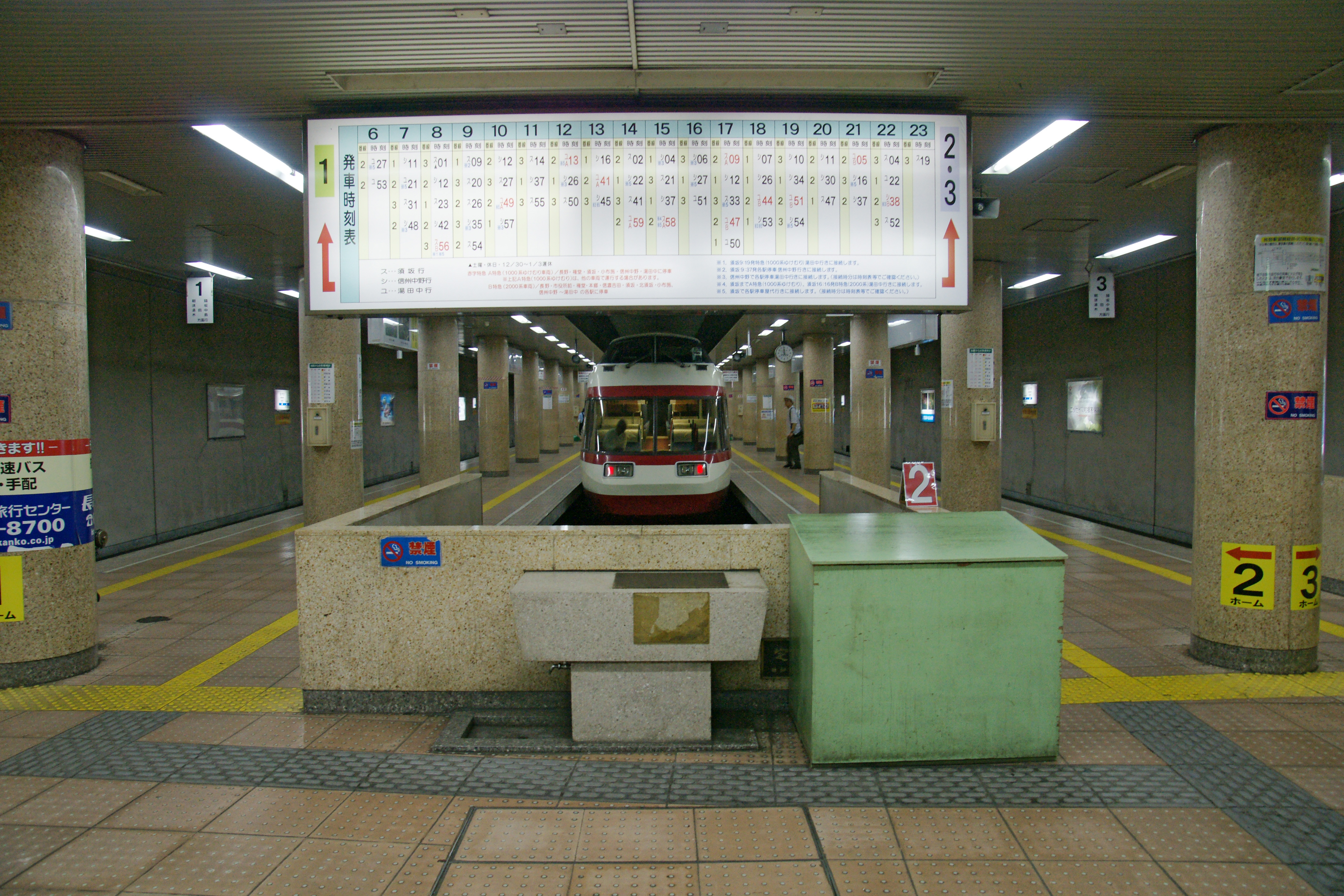
Platforms, July 2009

== History ==
Nagano Station opened on 1 May 1888. When the Japanese National Railways (JNR) were divided and privatized on 1 April 1987, the station became a part of the system of East Japan Railway Company (JR East). On 1 October 1997, JR East opened the Nagano Shinkansen with its terminus at Nagano.

== Bus terminals ==
=== Highway buses ===
- For Nerima Station, Nakano-sakaue Station, and Shinjuku Station
- For Nerima Station, Shimo-Ochiai Station, and Ikebukuro Station
- For Keisei Ueno Station, Asakusa, Tokyo Disney Resort, Nishi-Funabashi Station, and Narita International Airport
- For Sakudaira Station, Iwamurada Station, and Usuda
- For Matsumoto Bus Terminal (Matsumoto Station)
- For Hakuba-Goryu, Hakuba Station, Hakuba Happo, Tsugaike Kogen, and Hakuba-Norikura
- For Shinano-Ōmachi Station and Ōgizawa Station
- Misuzu Highway Bus; For Matsumoto, Okaya, Ina, Komagane, and Iida Station
- Seseragi; For Kamikōchi
- For Nigata Station
- For Kurobe, Uozu, Namerikawa, and Toyama Station
- Chuodo Kosoku Bus; For Tokadai, Sakae, and Nagoya Station
- Alpen Nagano; For Kyōto Station, Senri-Chūō Station, Momoyamadai Station, Shin-Ōsaka Station, and Umeda Station
- Southern Cross; For Kyoto Station, Ōsaka Station, JR Namba Station (OCAT), Namba Station, and Sannomiya Station

== Passenger statistics ==
In fiscal 2015, the JR East portion of the station was used by an average of 21,168 passengers daily (boarding passengers only).

== Incidents ==
On 22 January 2025, one person was killed and two others were injured in a mass stabbing at the station. A suspect was arrested on 26 January.
