= Shinonoi Station =

Railway station in Nagano, Nagano Prefecture, Japan

SE09 SN15 Shinonoi Station 篠ノ井駅
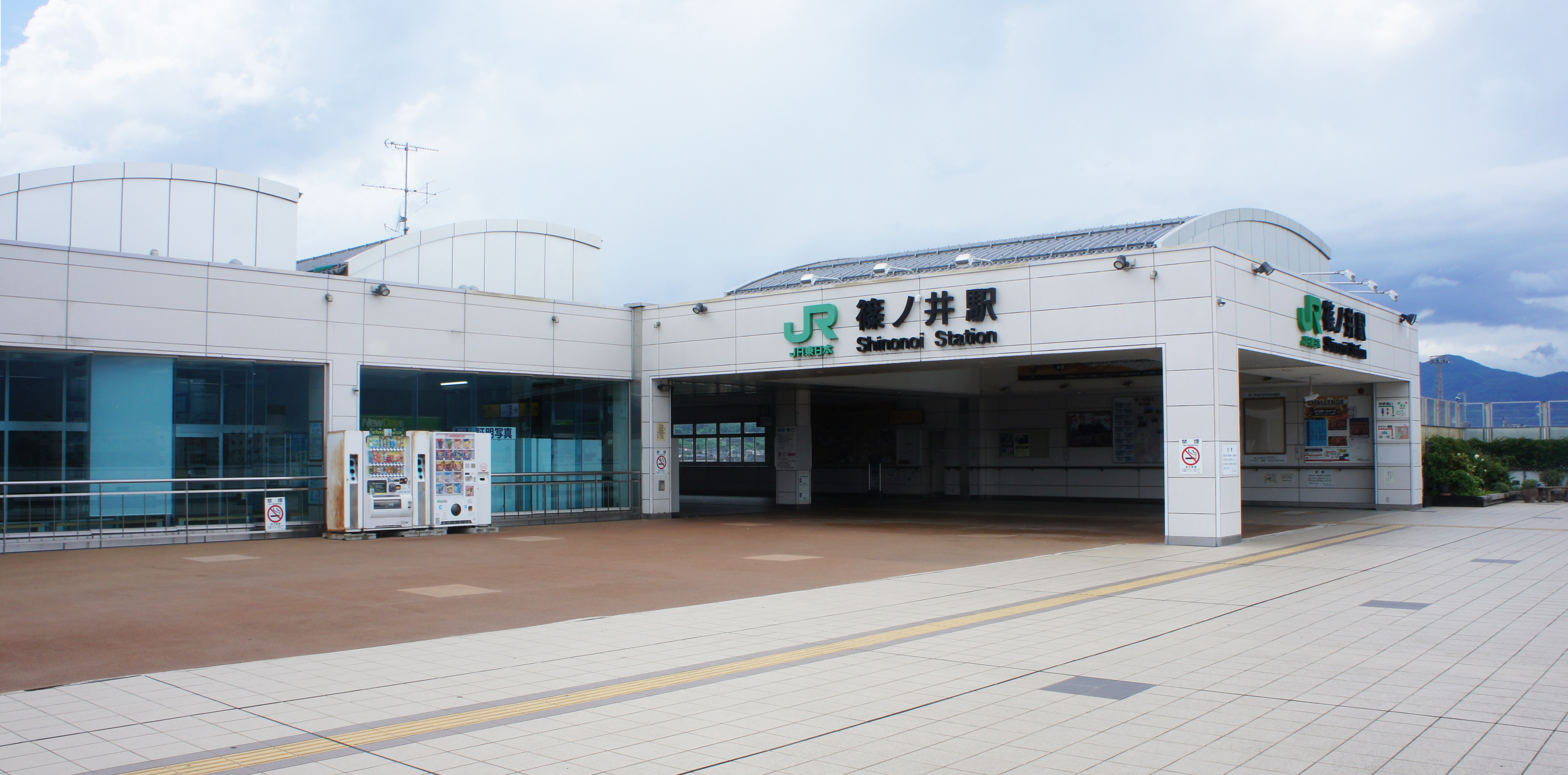
- Shinonoi Station east entrance, July 2021

General information
- Location: Shinonoifusetakada, Nagano-shi, Nagano-ken 388-8007; Japan
- Coordinates: 36.5777°N 138.1377°E
- Elevation: 356.2 meters
- Operator: JR East; Shinano Railway
- Lines: ■Shin'etsu Main Line sections: ■ Shinano Railway Line; ■ Shinonoi Line
- Platforms: 1 side + 1 island platform

Other information
- Website: Official website

History
- Opened: 15 August 1888

Passengers
- FY2015 (JR East): 10,188 daily

Services
| Preceding station | JR East | Following station |
|---|---|---|
| Hijiri-Kōgen towards Shiojiri | Shinano | Nagano Terminus |
| Terminus | Shin'etsu Main Line Shinonoi – Nagano | Imai SE10 towards Niigata |
| Inariyama SN14 (limited service) towards Shiojiri | Shinonoi Line Rapid | Kawanakajima SE11 (limited service) towards Shinonoi |
| Inariyama SN14 towards Shiojiri | Shinonoi Line Local & Rapid Misuzu | Imai SE10 towards Shinonoi |
| Preceding station | Shinano Railway | Following station |
| Yashiro towards Karuizawa | Shinano Railway Line Rapid | Kawanakajima towards Nagano |
| Yashiro Kōkō-mae towards Karuizawa | Shinano Railway Line Local | Imai towards Nagano |
Location
- Location within Nagano Prefecture Location within Japan

Shinonoi Station (篠ノ井駅, Shinonoi-eki) is a train station in the city of Nagano, Nagano Prefecture, Japan, operated jointly by East Japan Railway Company (JR East), with the third-sector railway operating company Shinano Railway.

== Lines ==
Shinonoi Station is one of the intermediate terminals of the discontinuous Shin'etsu Main Line, and is 9.3 kilometers from Nagano Station. It is also the terminus for the Shinonoi Line and the 65.1 kilometer Shinano Railway Line.

== Station layout ==
The station consists of a one ground-level island platform and one side platform, connected to the station building by a footbridge. The station has a Midori no Madoguchi staffed ticket office.

=== Platforms ===
| 1 | ■ Shinonoi Line | for Matsumoto, Kami-Suwa, and Kōfu |
| 2 | ■ Shinano Railway Line | for Ueda and Komoro |
| 3 | ■ Shin'etsu Main Line | for Nagano |

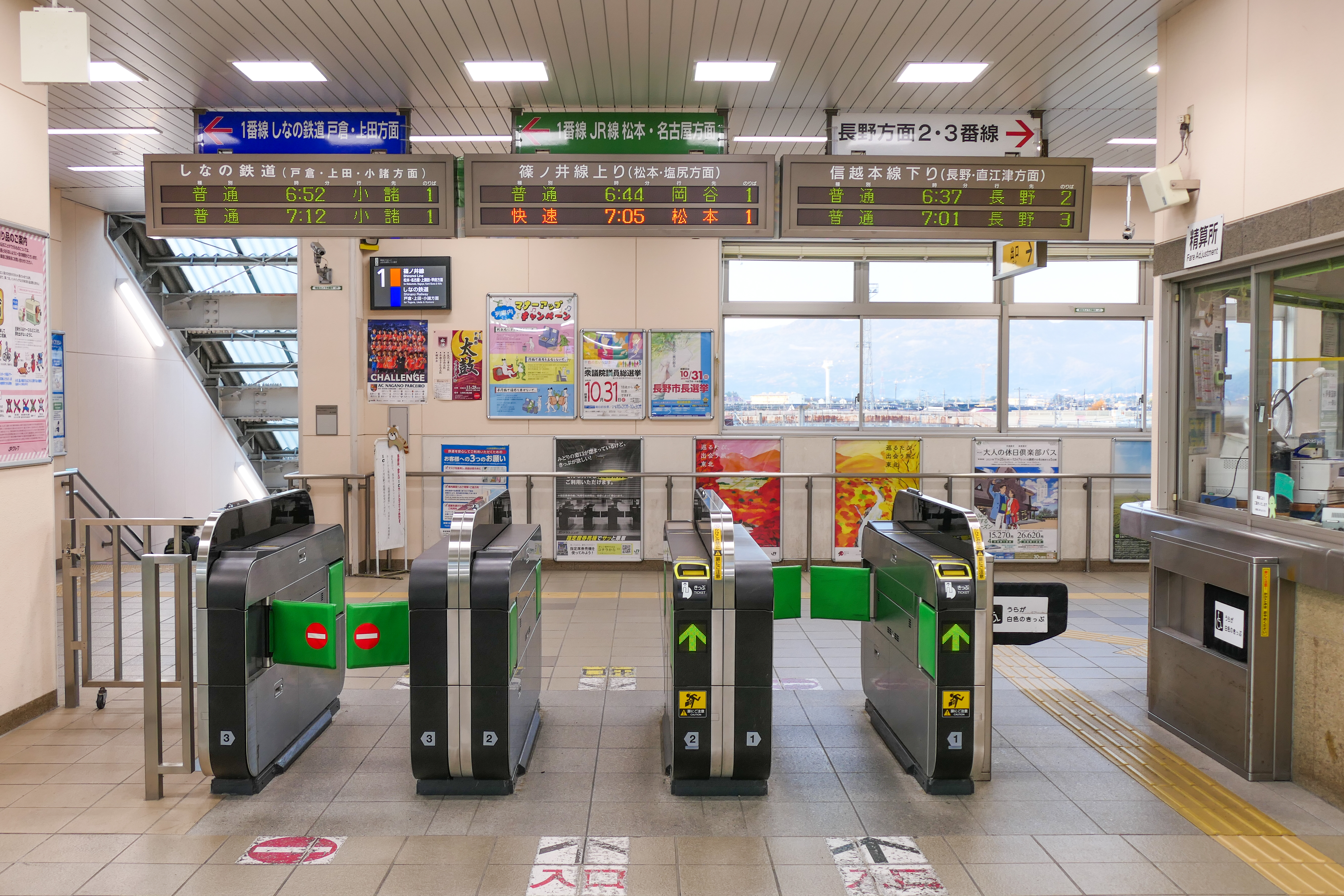
Ticket gate, October 2021

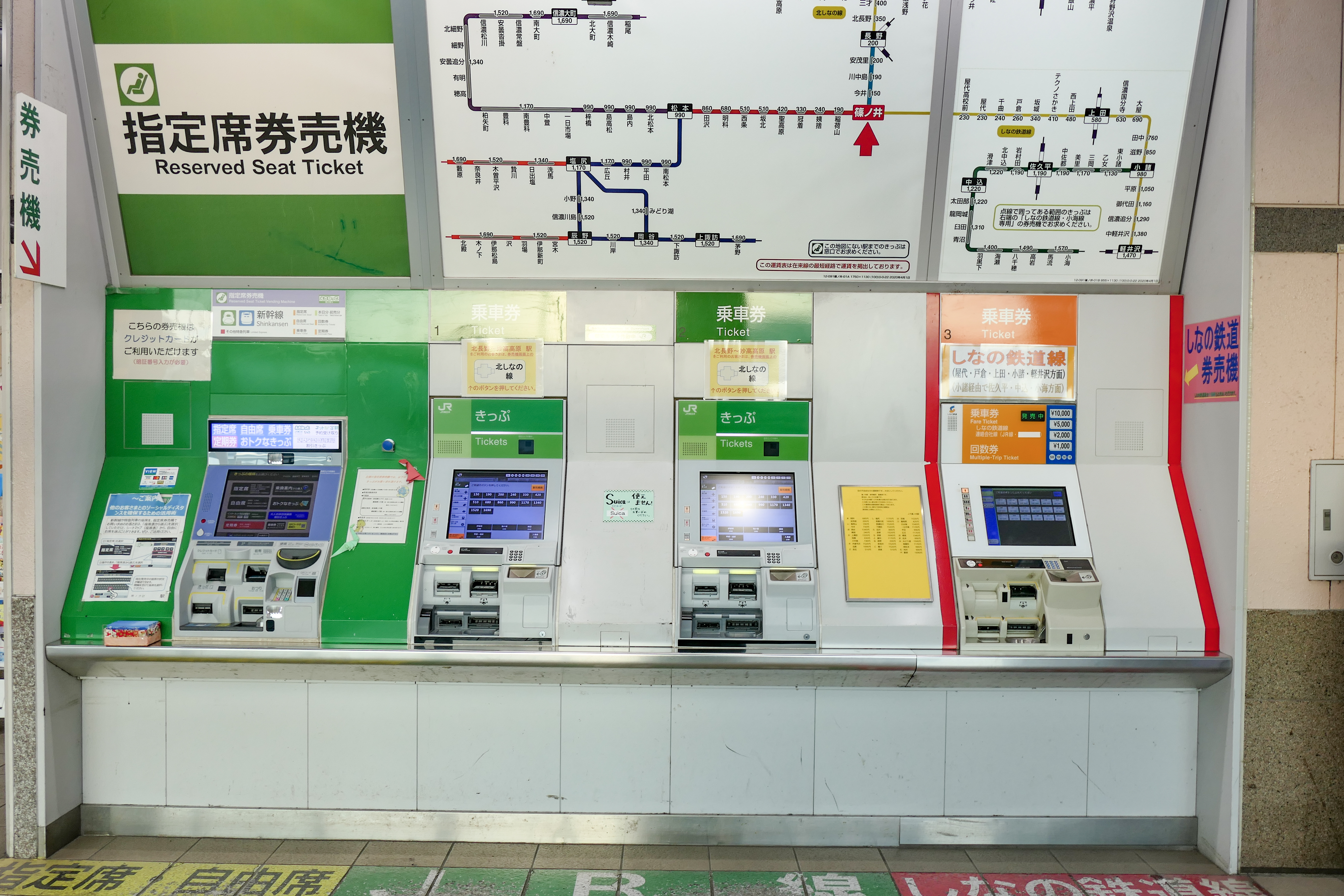
Ticket vending machine, October 2021

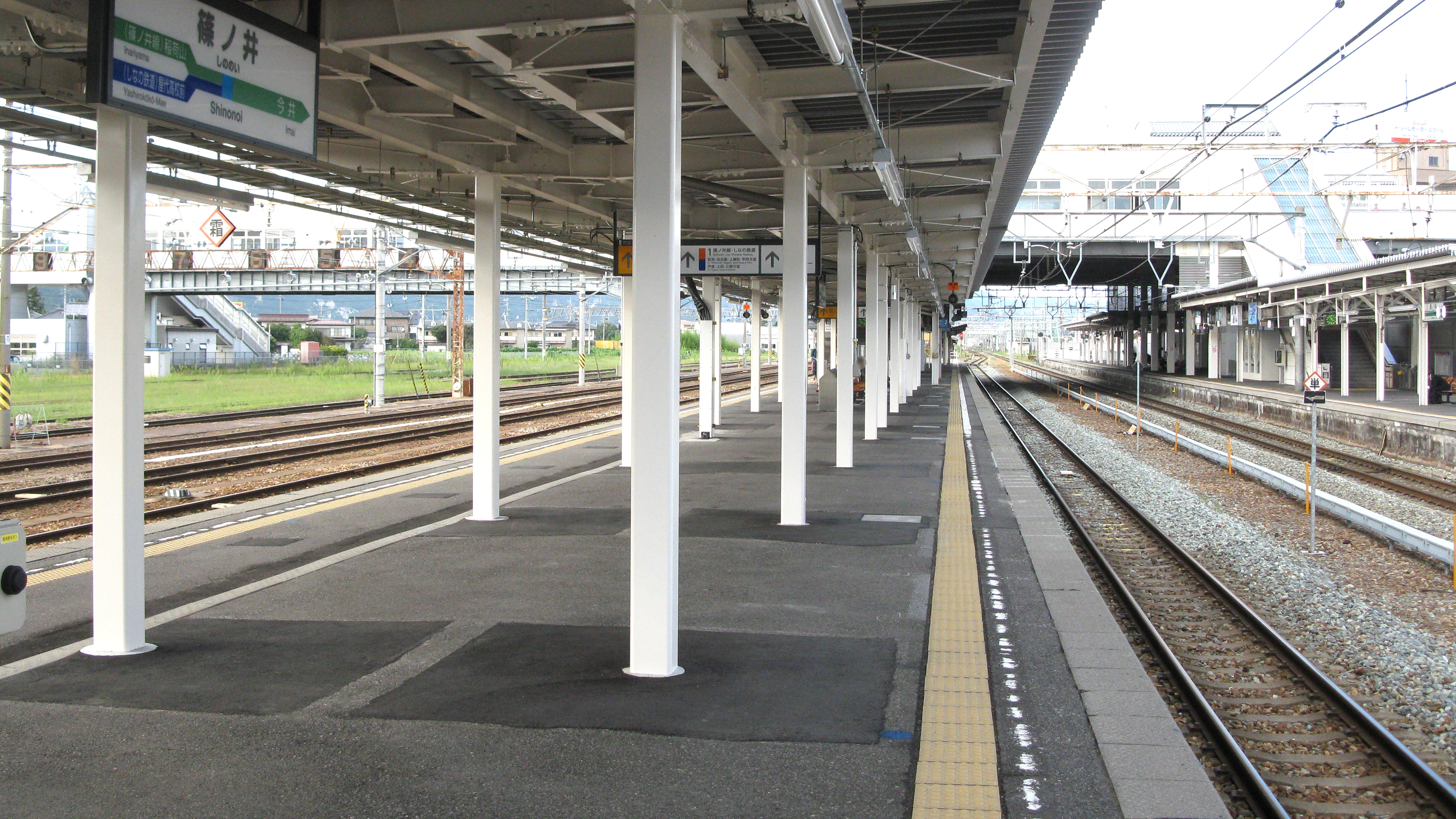
Platforms, September 2011

== History ==
Shinanoi Station was opened on 15 August 1888. In the 1987 privatization of the Japanese National Railways (JNR), the station was assigned to the control of the East Japan Railway Company.

== Passenger statistics ==
In fiscal 2015, the station was used by an average of 19,188 passengers daily (boarding passengers only).

== Surrounding area ==
- Shinonoi Post Office
- Minami Nagano Sports Park Stadium, home of town football club AC Nagano Parceiro

== See also ==
- List of railway stations in Japan
