= List of surviving North American F-86 Sabres =

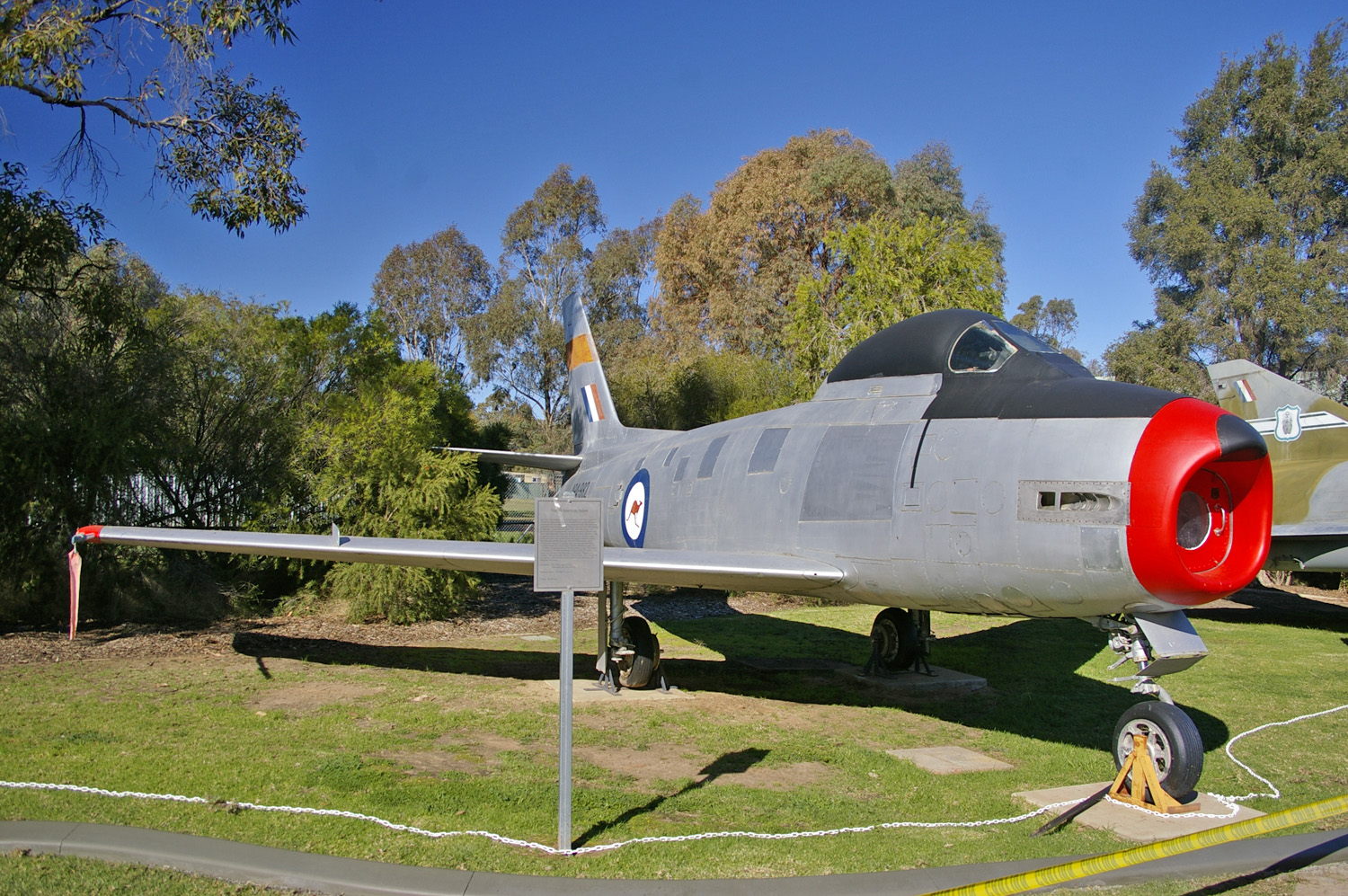
An Australian CA-27 Mk.32 Sabre on display at RAAF Base Wagga

The North American F-86 Sabre was a post-war jet fighter that entered service with the United States Air Force in 1949 and was retired from active duty by Bolivia in 1994. F-86s were licence-built in Italy by Fiat Aviazione and in Japan by Mitsubishi Heavy Industries. Variants were produced in Australia as the CAC CA-27 Sabre and in Canada as the Canadair CL-13 Sabre.

== Surviving aircraft ==
=== Argentina ===
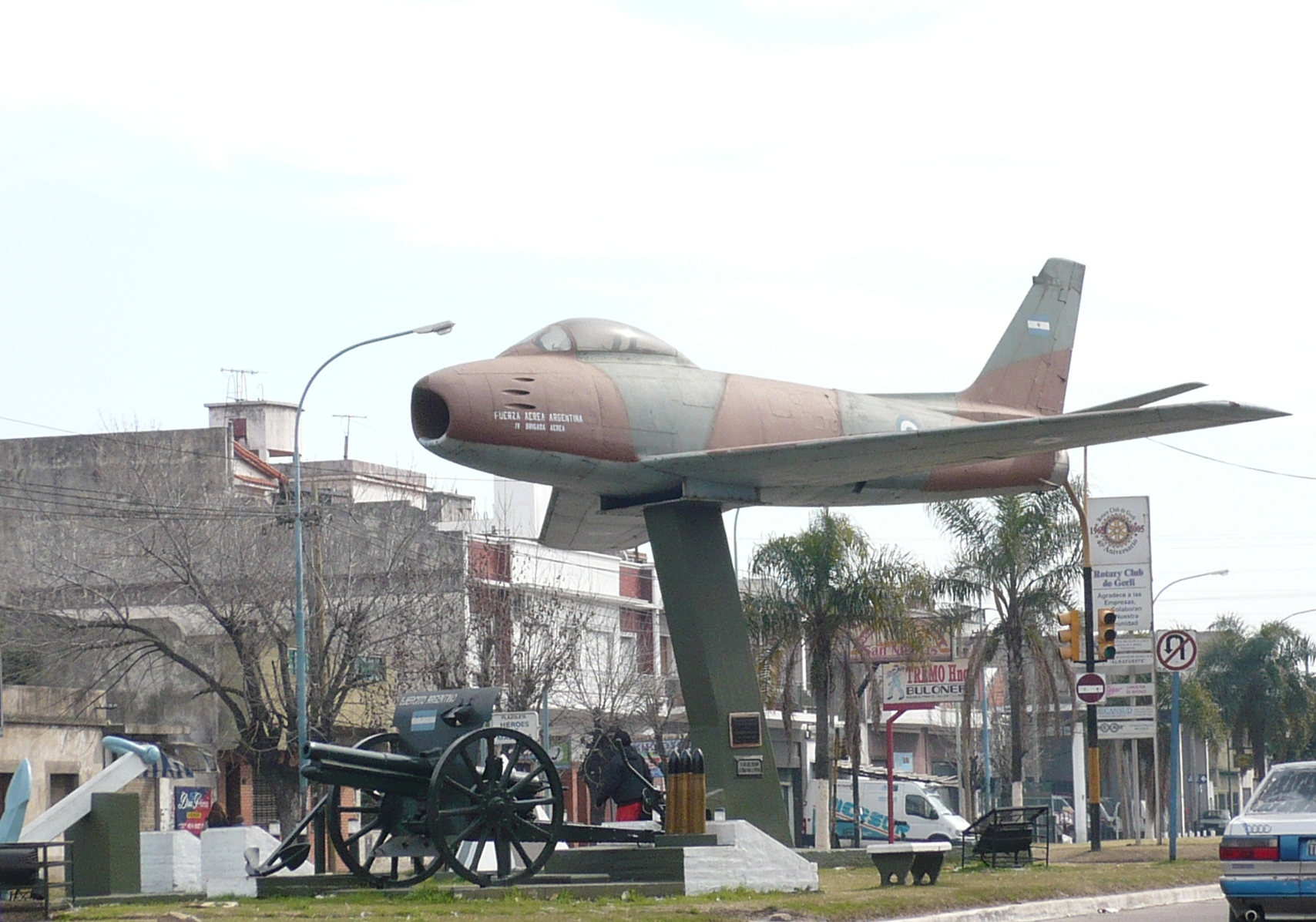
Argentine Air Force F-86F at Lanús

The Argentine Air Force (FAA) acquired 28 F-86F Sabres as a program to modernize the FAA.

F-86F

- C-122 – National Aeronautics Museum, Morón, Buenos Aires.

=== Australia ===
Airworthy

CA-27 Mk.32

- VH-IPN (A94-983) Royal Australian Air Force (RAAF) – restored to flying condition as VH-PCM in the 1980s and grounded in the 1990s; loaned to the Temora Aviation Museum, Temora, New South Wales, where it was again restored to airworthy condition; displayed regularly (registered VH-IPN) since September 2009. Ownership was transferred to the RAAF in July 2019 and it is operated by the Air Force Heritage Squadron (Temora Historic Flight).
- VH-SBR (A94-352) – Latrobe Flying Museum Restored and owned by former squadron leader Jeff Trappett, using parts from A94-907 which he also owns. A94-352 had its second test flight 5 October 2013

On display

CA-26

- A94-101 – RAAF Museum, RAAF Base Williams, Point Cook, Victoria; CAC Sabre prototype, first aircraft to fly faster than the speed of sound in Australia.

CA-27 Mk.31

- A94-901 – Historical Aircraft Restoration Society, Illawarra Regional Airport, New South Wales; first production CAC Sabre.
- A94-914/921 – Darwin Aviation Museum, Winnellie, Northern Territory (composite of A94-914 (forward) and A94-921 (rear), with wings from a Mk.32 series)
- A94-915 – Narromine Aviation Museum, Narromine Airport, New South Wales.
- A94-935 – Queensland Air Museum, Caloundra, Queensland.

CA-27 Mk.32

- A94-944 – RAAF Museum, RAAF Base Williams, Point Cook, Victoria.
- A94-951 – Fighter World, RAAF Base Williamtown.
- A94-959 – Fighter World, RAAF Base Williamtown.
- A94-974 – Classic Jets Fighter Museum, Parafield Airport, South Australia.
- A94-982 – RAAF Museum, RAAF Base Wagga, Forest Hill, New South Wales.
- A94-989 – Mildura, Victoria (privately owned under restoration to static display in 2023, formerly Australian National Aviation Museum, Moorabbin Airport, Victoria.)

Stored or under restoration

CA-27 Mk.32

- A94-970 – Australian War Memorial in storage at RAAF Williams, Point Cook, Victoria.

=== Belgium ===
F-86F

- 5316 Portuguese Air Force F86F at the Royal Museum of the Armed Forces and Military History in Brussels

=== Brazil ===
F-86K

- 0014 – Museu Aeroespacial in Rio de Janeiro, Brazil. This aircraft was donated by the Venezuelan Air Force.

=== Canada ===
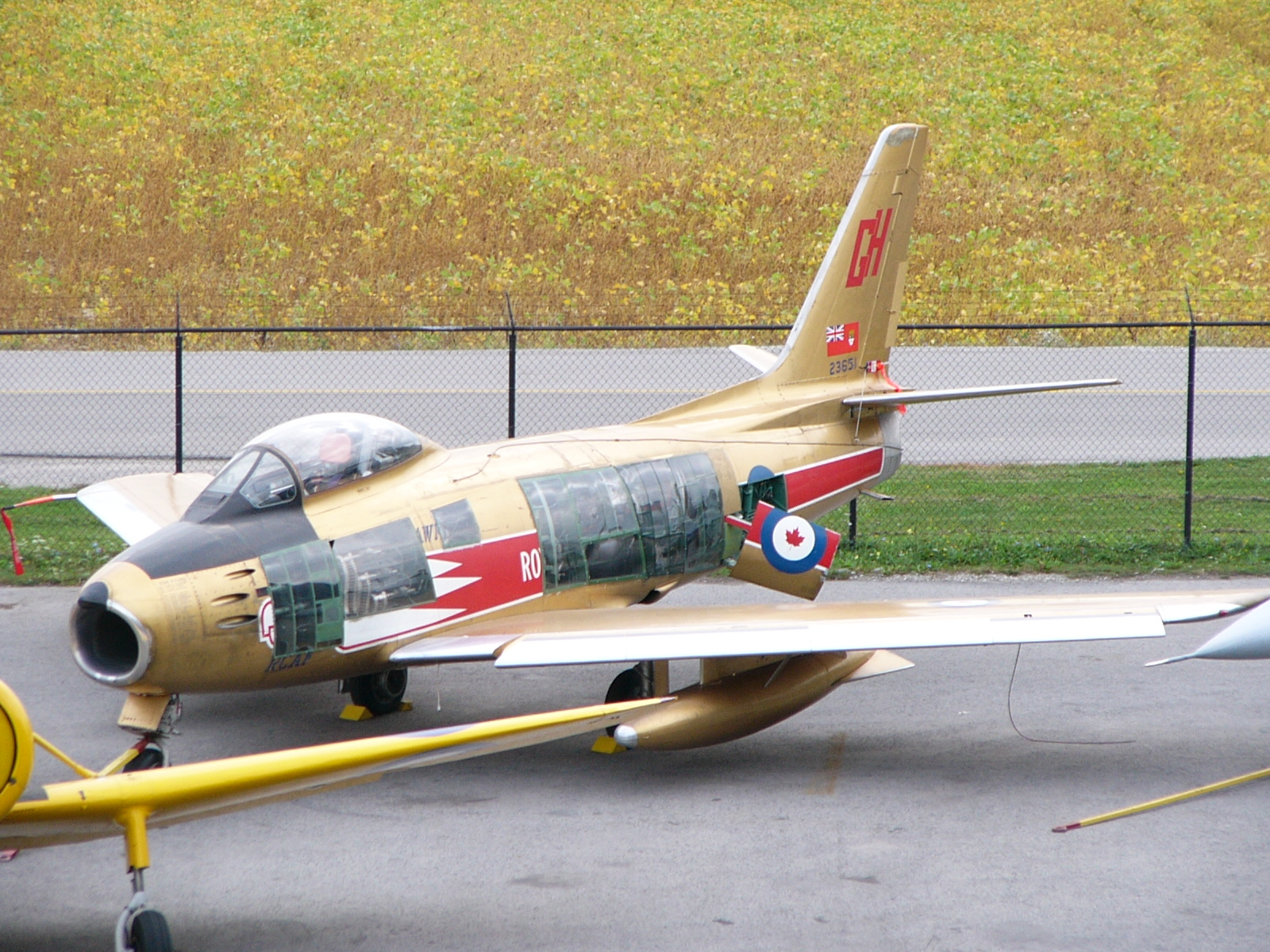
Sabre Mk VI cut-away display aircraft at the Canadian Warplane Heritage Museum.

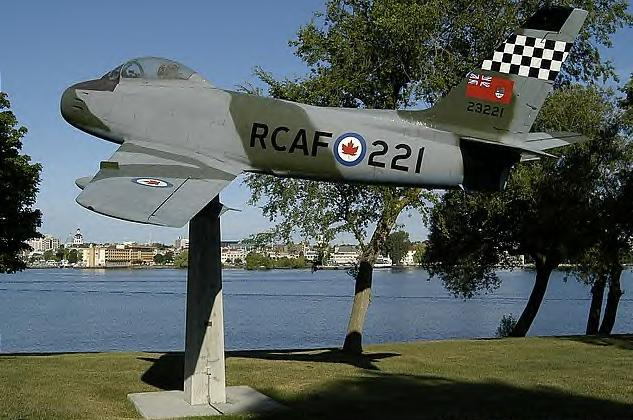
CL-13 Canadair Sabre on display at Royal Military College of Canada

On display

CL-13 Sabre Mk. I

- 19101 Alberta Aviation Museum in Edmonton, Alberta.

CL-13 Sabre Mk III

- 19200 – Reynolds Alberta Museum, Wetaskiwin, Alberta.

CL-13 Sabre Mk. V

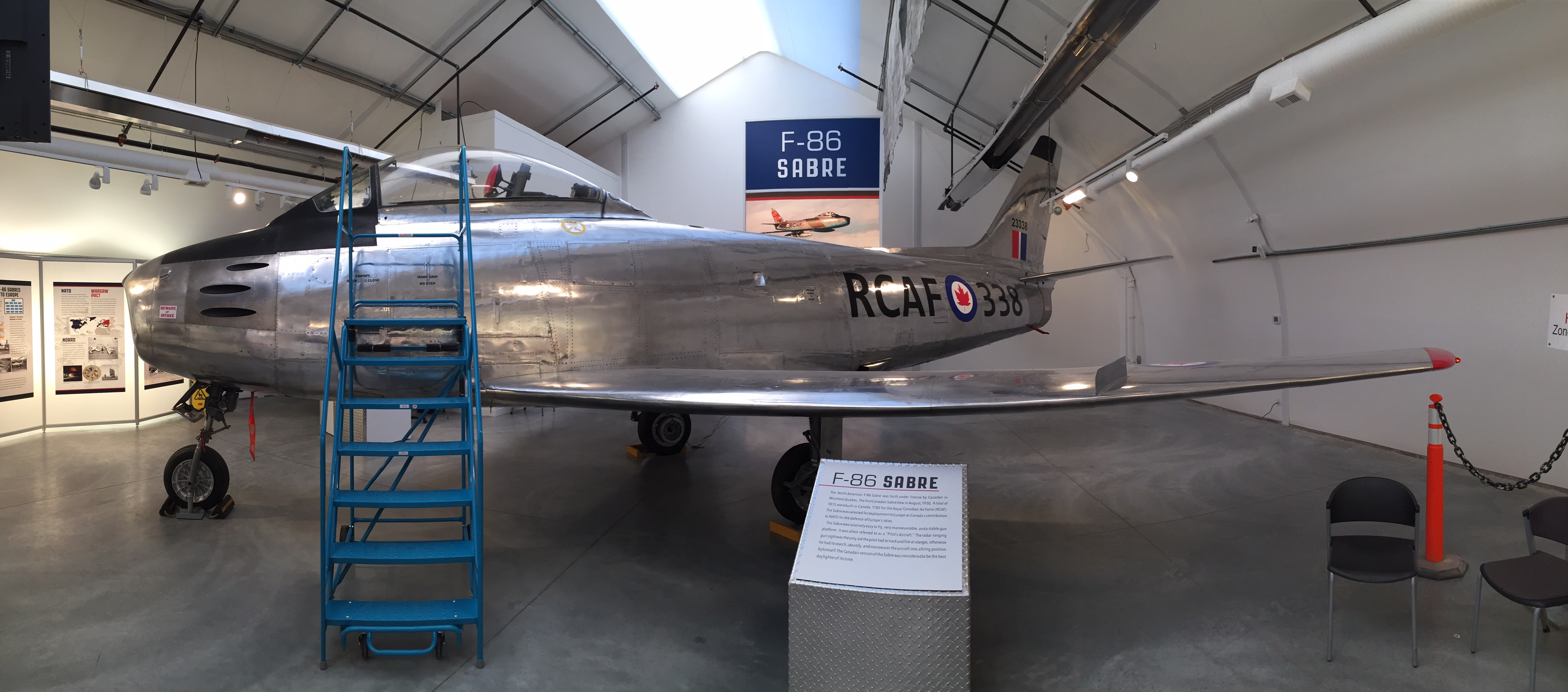
CL-13 Mk.5 – 23338, of the Royal Canadian Air Force on display at the Air Force Museum of Alberta, located within the Military Museums, Calgary, Alberta.

- 23338 – Air Force Museum of Alberta, located within the Military Museums, Calgary, Alberta.
- 23355 – Atlantic Canada Aviation Museum, Enfield, Nova Scotia.
- 23257 – RCAF Memorial Museum, Trenton, Ontario.
- Community Gardens, Trenton, Ont, Golden Hawks colours, on pole, Trenton, Ontario.
- 23221 – Royal Military College of Canada, Kingston, Ontario, on pole, Kingston, Ontario.
- 23047 – Oshawa Airport (gate guard on pole back entrance), Oshawa, Ontario.
- 23164 – Germain Park, Sarnia, Ont, Golden Hawks colours, on pole, Sarnia, Ontario, has been dismounted and repainted. Back on display in and seen in Sept. 2015..
- 23649 – Blockhouse Island, Brockville, Ont, Golden Hawks colours, on pole, Brockville, Ontario.
- 23245 – Peterborough Riverview Park & Zoo, on pole, refurbished 2009, Peterborough, Ontario
- 23053 – Belleville Centennial Park, Ont, Golden Hawks colours, on pole, Belleville, Ontario.

CL-13 Sabre Mk VI

- 1815 (Pakistan Air Force) – Western Canada Aviation Museum in Winnipeg, Manitoba. Was the final CL-13 airframe built by Canadair.
- 23060 – Army, Navy and Air force Veterans Club #302 – 9831 – 4th Street, Sidney, B.C. Based on serial should be listed as a MK V if serial correct.
- 23651 Golden Hawks – Canadian Warplane Heritage Museum, John C. Munro International Airport, Hamilton, Ontario

=== Colombia ===
On display

CL-13B Sabre Mk. VI

- El Dorado Airport.
- Cali Air Base.

F-86K

- ex Venezuelan Air Force at the Palanquero Air Base

=== Czech Republic ===
CA-27 Mk.31 CA27-23 A94-923 – at the Aviation Museum – Kbely, Prague.

=== France ===
Airworthy

CL-13 Sabre Mk VI

- F-AYSB – privately owned at Avignon-Caumont.

=== Germany ===
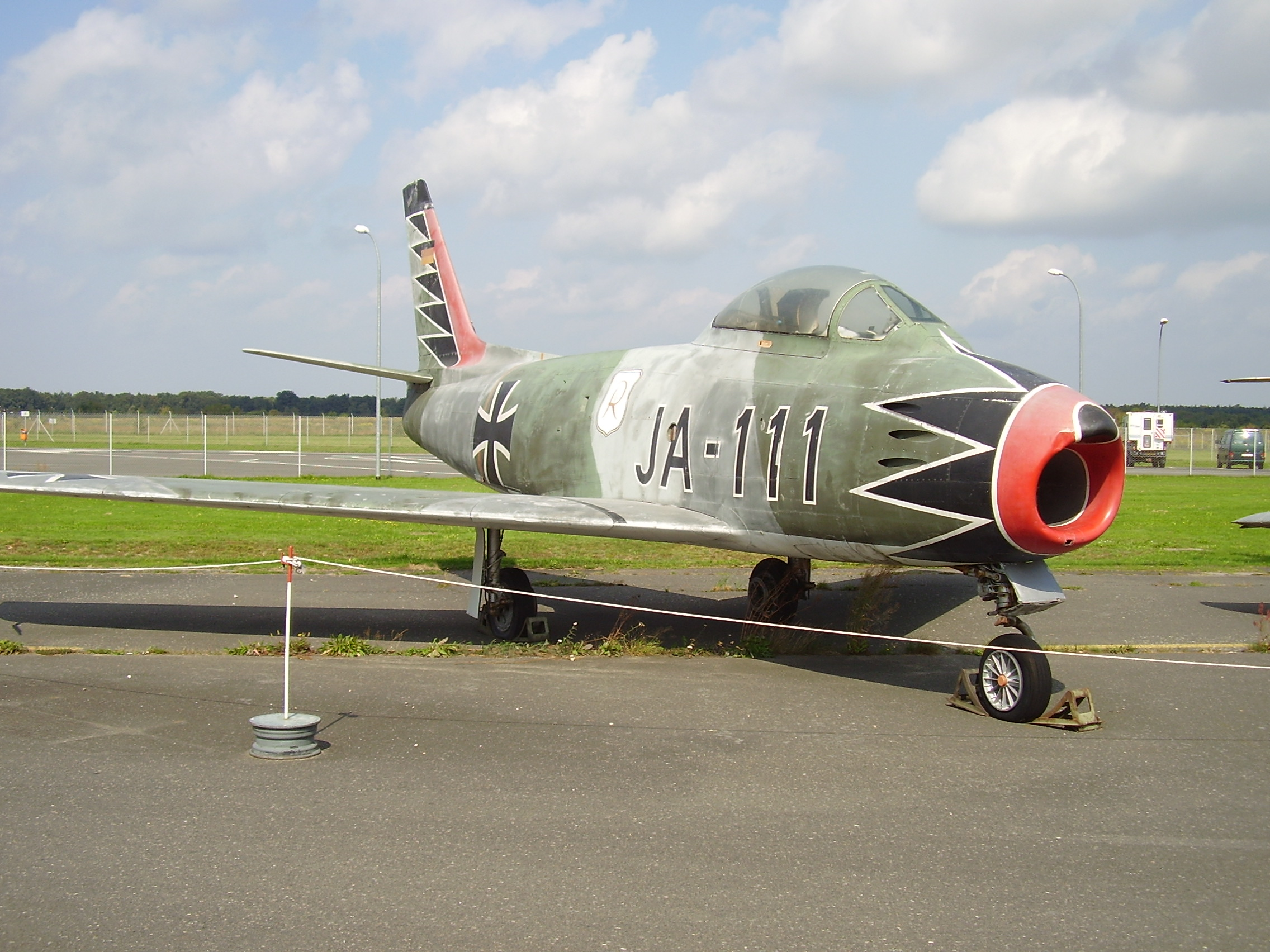
German Air Force Canadair Sabre Mk.6 at Luftwaffenmuseum der Bundeswehr, Berlin-Gatow

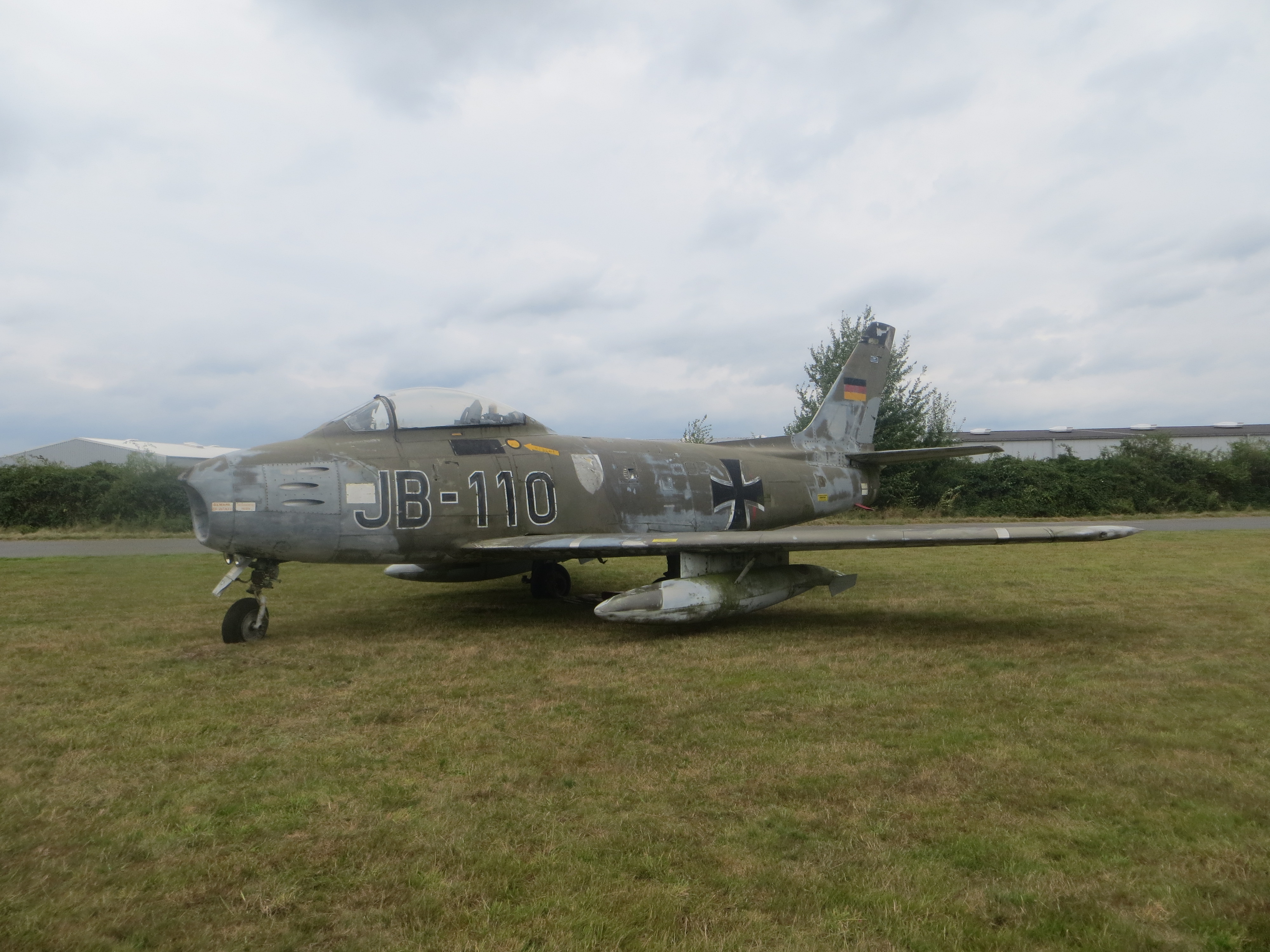
German Air Force Canadair Sabre Mk.6 at Uetersen Airfield

CL-13 Sabre Mk VI

- D-9542 – Luftwaffenmuseum der Bundeswehr, Berlin-Gatow.
- JA+111 – Luftwaffenmuseum der Bundeswehr, Berlin-Gatow.
- JB+110 – Uetersen Airfield.
- KE+105 – Deutsches Museum Flugwerft Schleissheim
- BB+183/01+04 painted as '23042' of the Golden Hawks – Technikmuseum Speyer, Speyer.
- JC-101 – Flugausstellung Peter Junior, Hermeskeil.

F-86K

- JD-249 – Luftwaffenmuseum der Bundeswehr, Berlin-Gatow.

=== Greece ===
F-86D

- 51-8404 – Athens War Museum.

=== Honduras ===
F-86K

- FAH 1101 on display at Armando Escalon AB, La Lima

=== Indonesia ===
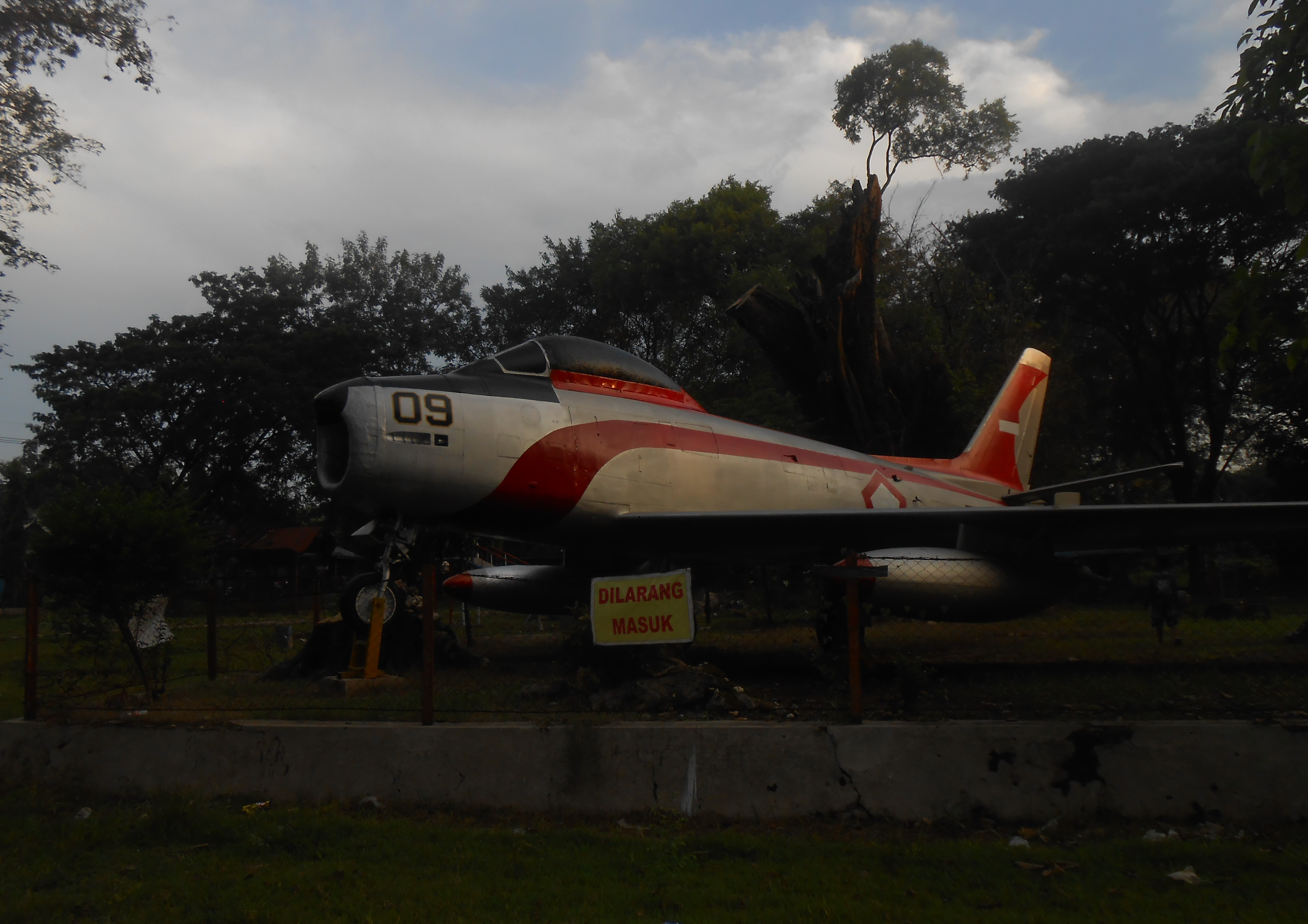
TNI-AU CA-27 Avon Sabre Mk.32 at Bojonegoro Regency

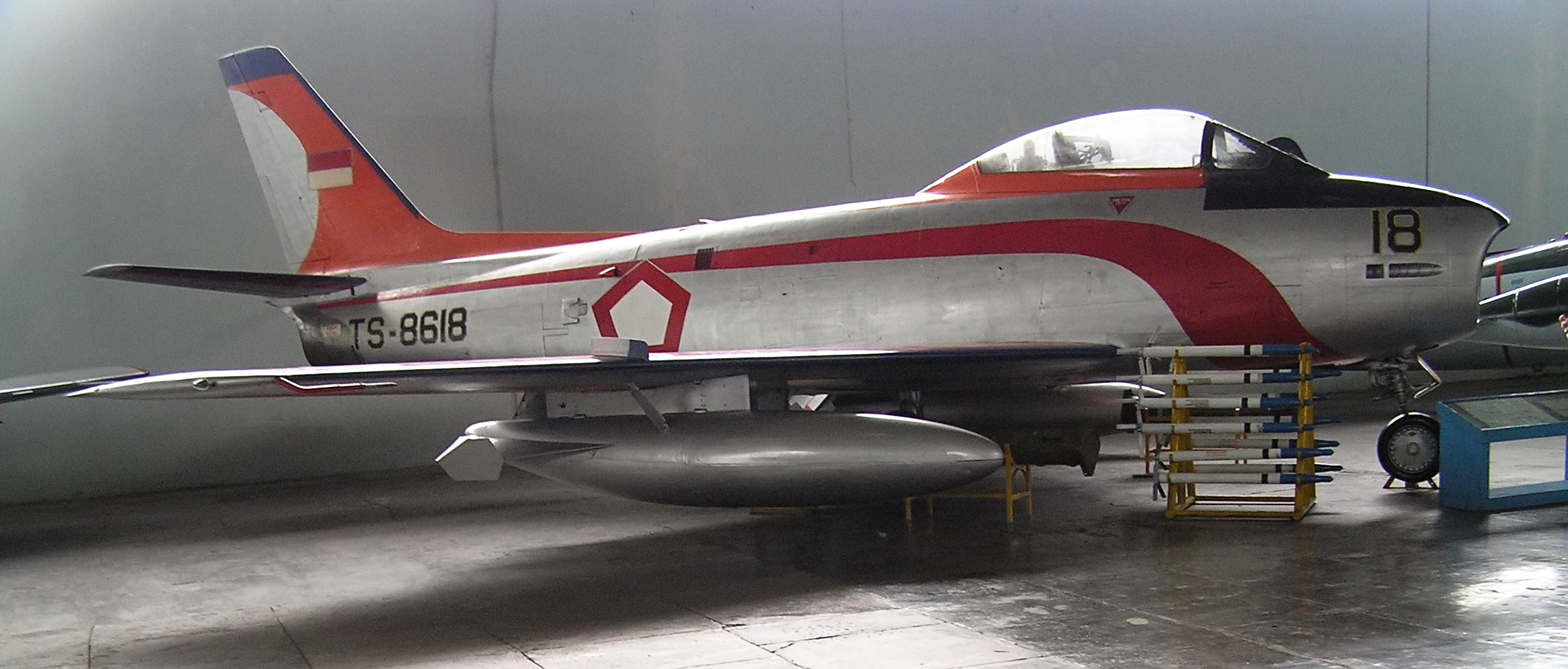
TNI-AU CA-27 Avon Sabre Mk.32 at Dirgantara Mandala Museum

CA-27 Mk.32

- TS-8603 – Halim Perdanakusuma International Airport, East Jakarta, Jakarta
- TS-8607 – Umbul Madiun Recreational Park, Madiun Regency, East Java
- TS-8608 – Sultan Mahmud Badaruddin II International Airport, Palembang, South Sumatra. Fitted with the tail of TS-8614
- TS-8609 – Wana Wisata Dander, Bojonegoro Regency, East Java
- TS-8615 – Indonesian Air Force Academy, Sleman Regency, Special Region of Yogyakarta
- TS-8616 – Sendang Asri Park, Gajah Mungkur Dam, Wonogiri Regency, Central Java
- TS-8618 – Dirgantara Mandala Museum, Sleman Regency, Special Region of Yogyakarta
- TS-8621 – Iswahyudi Air Force Base, Magetan, East Java
- TS-8622 – Gedung Juang 45 Pekanbaru, Pekanbaru, Riau

=== Italy ===
CL-13

- CL-13 Mk.4 MM19724 Italian Air Force Museum, Vigna di Valle, formerly Royal Canadian Air Force 19724, Royal Air Force XD723

F-86K

- MM55-4868 Italian Air Force Museum, Vigna di Valle, formerly flown by Armee de L'air

=== Japan ===
F-86D

- Ashiya Air Field, Ashiya, Fukuoka Prefecture
- Komaki Airbase, Komaki, Aichi Prefecture
- Tsuiki Airbase, Chikujo, Fukuoka Prefecture
- Gifu Air Field, Gifu, Gifu Prefecture
- Chippubetsu Family Sports Park, Chippubetsu, Hokkaido Prefecture
- Chitose Air Base, Chitose, Hokkaido Prefecture
- Matsushima Air Base, Matsushima, Miyagi Prefecture
- Nyutabaru Air Base, Shintomi, Miyazaki Prefecture
- Hyakuri Air Base, Omitama, Ibaraki Prefecture
- Komatsu Air Base, Komatsu, Ishikawa Prefecture
- Kaimondake Nature Park, Ibusuki, Kagoshima Prefecture
- Hijiri Aviation Museum, Omi, Nagano Prefecture
- Nara Air Base, Nara, Nara Prefecture
- Kumagaya Air Base, Kumagaya, Saitama Prefecture
- Camp Ōtsu GSDF base, Ōtsu, Shiga Prefecture
- Forward fuselage, Fujisan Juku no Mori Park, Gotemba Shizuoka Prefecture
- Hamamatsu Air Base, Hamamatsu, Shizuoka Prefecture
- Shizuhama Air Base, Yaizu, Shizuoka Prefecture
- Miho Air Base, Tottori Prefecture
- Hōfu Kita Air Base, Yamaguchi Prefecture
- Japan Aviation High School, Kai, Yamanashi Prefecture

F-86F

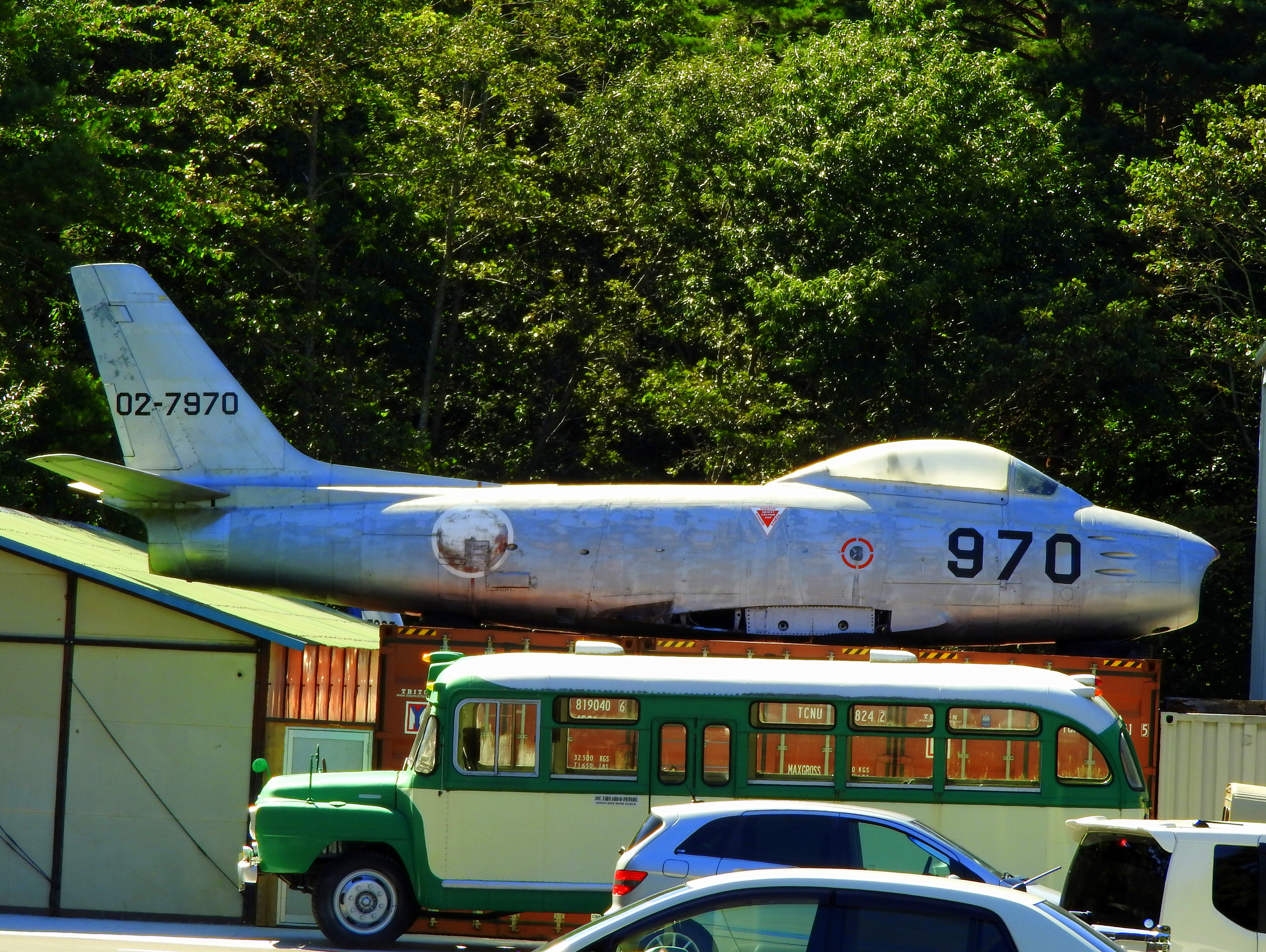
F-86F Sabre (02-7970) at Kawaguchiko Motor Museum, Yamanashi Prefecture, Japan

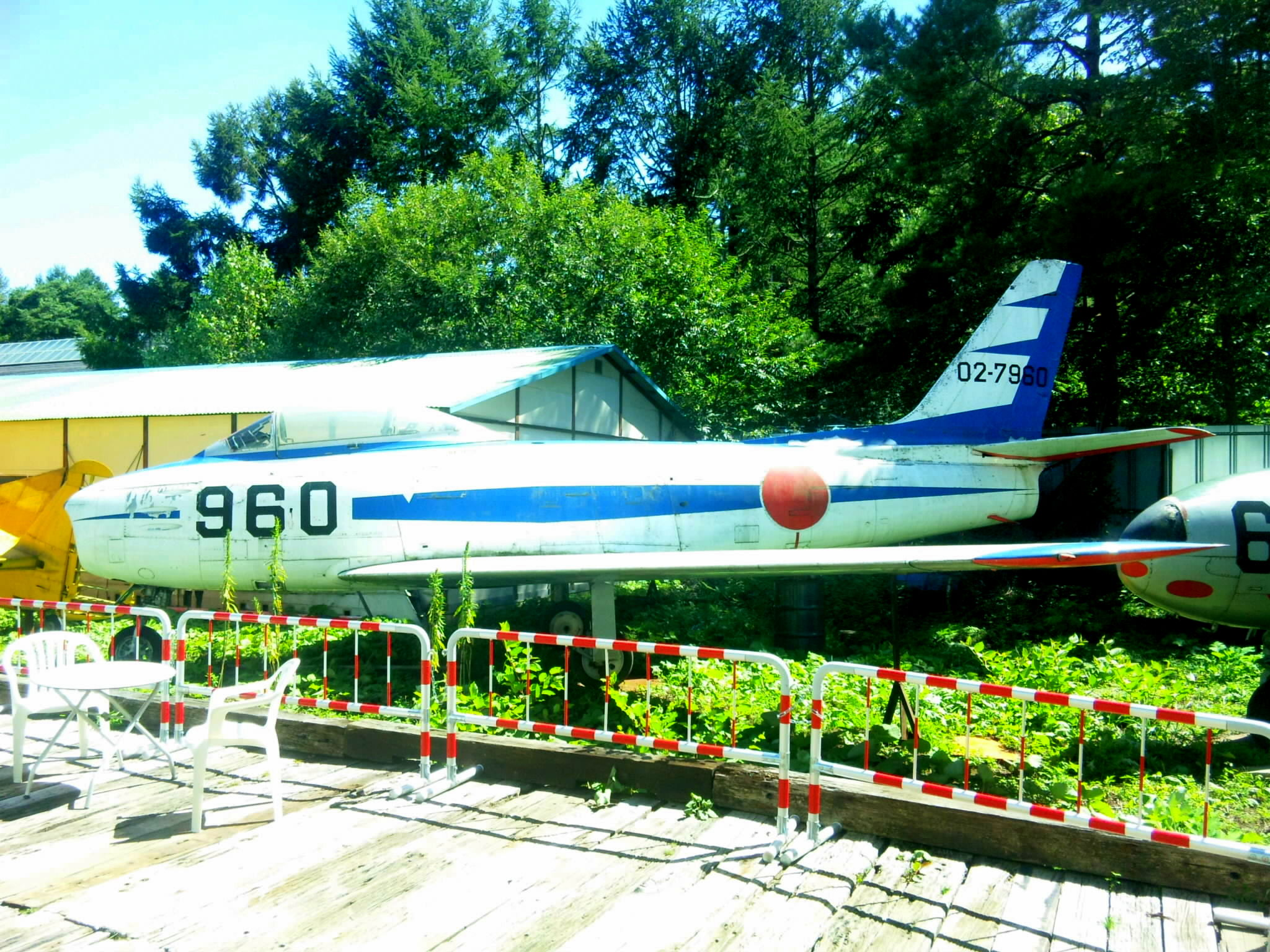
North American F-86F Sabre (02-7962) at Kawaguchiko Motor Museum, Yamanashi Prefecture, Japan

- 02-7970 Kawaguchiko Motor Museum
- 02-7960 Kawaguchiko Motor Museum
- Komaki Airbase, Komaki, Aichi Prefecture
- Mitsubishi Heavy Industries Komaki South Plant Komaki, Aichi Prefecture
- Nukata District Museum Kōta, Aichi Prefecture
- Ashiya Air Field, Ashiya, Fukuoka Prefecture
- Kasuga Air Base, Kasuga, Fukuoka Prefecture
- Tsuiki Airbase, Tsuiki, Fukuoka Prefecture
- Old Car Centre, Naraha, Fukushima Prefecture
- Gifu Air Field, Gifu, Gifu Prefecture
- Chitose Air Base, Chitose, Hokkaido Prefecture
- Hyakuri Air Base, Omitama, Ibaraki Prefecture
- Komatsu Air Base, Komatsu, Ishikawa Prefecture
- Matsushima Air Base, Matsushima, Miyagi Prefecture
- Nyutabaru Air Base, Shintomi, Miyazaki Prefecture
- Hijiri Aviation Museum, Omi, Nagano Prefecture
- Nara Air Base, Nara, Nara Prefecture
- Drug Tops Drugstore Uonuma, Niigata Prefecture
- Nippon Bunri University, Ōita, Ōita Prefecture
- Hachimenzan Peace Park, Sankō, Nakatsu, Ōita Prefecture
- 82-7807 Iruma Air Base, Sayama, Saitama Prefecture
- Kumagaya Air Base, Kumagaya, Saitama Prefecture
- Hamamatsu Air Base, Hamamatsu, Shizuoka Prefecture
- A second F-86F also at Hamamatsu Air Base, Hamamatsu, Shizuoka Prefecture
- Sodeura Park, Iwata, Shizuoka Prefecture
- Shizuhama Air Base, Yaizu, Shizuoka Prefecture
- Utsunomiya Air Field, Utsunomiya, Tochigi Prefecture
- 62-7511 (displayed as FU-832 Nina II), Yokota Air Base, Fussa, Tokyo Prefecture

=== Malaysia ===
- FM19-17 on display outside at Perak Museum, Taiping, Perak

=== Netherlands ===
CL13B

- c/n 1704 North American (Canadair) CL-13B Sabre Mk.6 on display as FU-012 / 25012 at Verkeerstoren Ypenburg, Nootdorp

F-86F

- 52-5385 – FU-385 on display outside at the Nationaal Militair Museum, Soesterberg

F-86K

- 53-8305 – (ex Italian Air Force) on display as Q-305 / 54-1305. Nationaal Militair Museum, Soesterberg
- 54-1283 – Q-283 on display outside at the Nationaal Militair Museum, Soesterberg

=== New Zealand ===
CA-27 Mk.31

- A94-922 – under restoration to fly at Ardmore Airport, Auckland, for a private collector in the USA.

=== Norway ===
F-86F

- 52-5069 – AH-D, Forsvarets flysamling Gardermoen, Oslo Airport, Gardermoen near Oslo.
- 52-5202 – MU-F, Gateguard at Ørland Main Air Station
- 53-1082 – AH-A, Flyhistorisk Museum, Sola, Stavanger Airport, Sola, near Stavanger.
- 53-1206 – FN-D, Norwegian Aviation Museum, in Bodø.

F-86K

- 54-1245 – RI-Z, Stored at Norwegian Aviation Museum, in Bodø.
- 54-1266 – ZK-L, Flyhistorisk Museum, Sola, Stavanger Airport, Sola, near Stavanger.
- 54-1274 – RI-T, Forsvarets flysamling Gardermoen, Oslo Airport, Gardermoen near Oslo.
- 54-1290 – ZK-Z, Dakota Norway, Sandefjord Airport, Torp near Sandefjord.

=== Pakistan ===
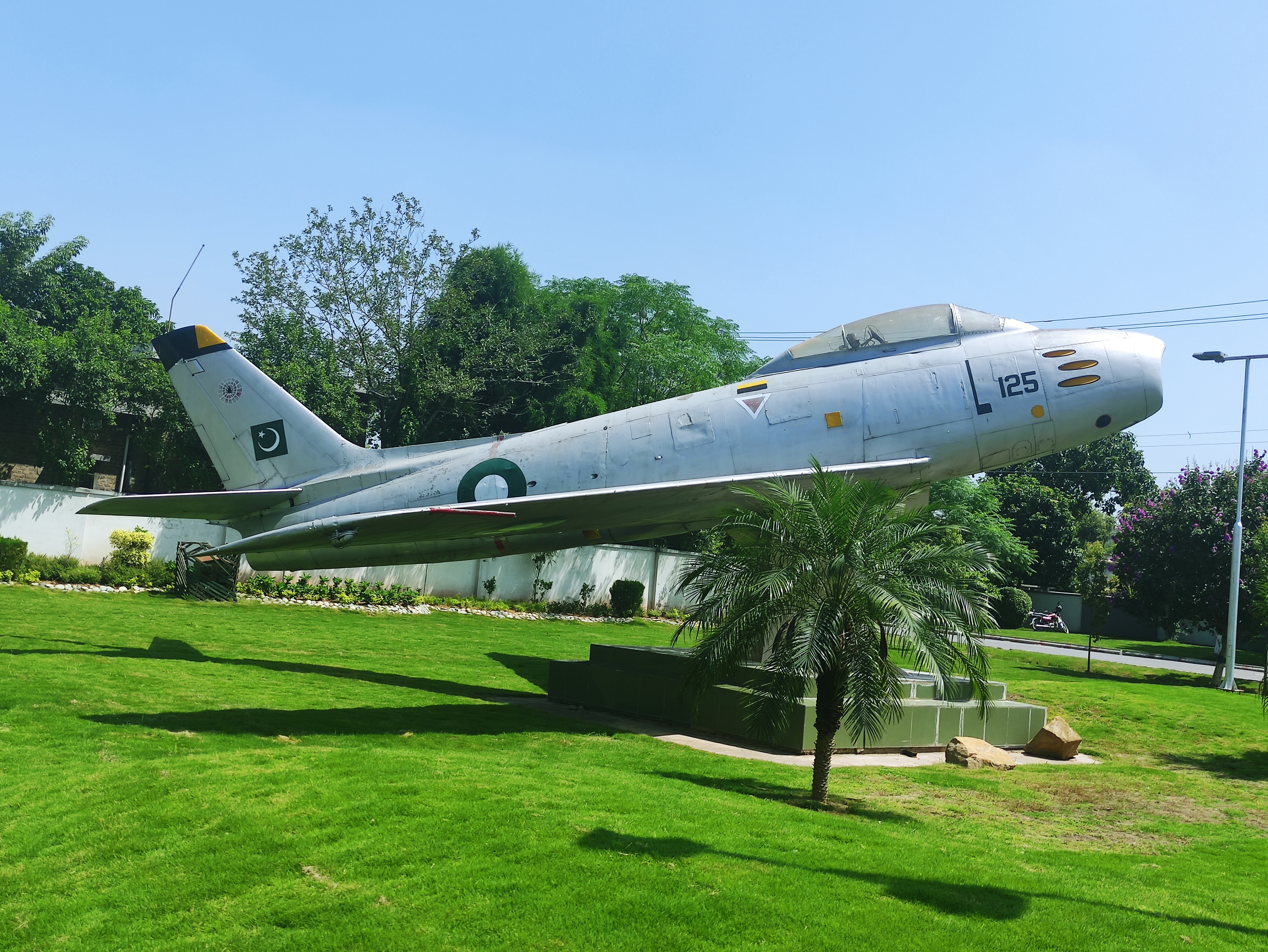
A retired Sabre from the No. 26 Squadron "Black Spiders" of PAF

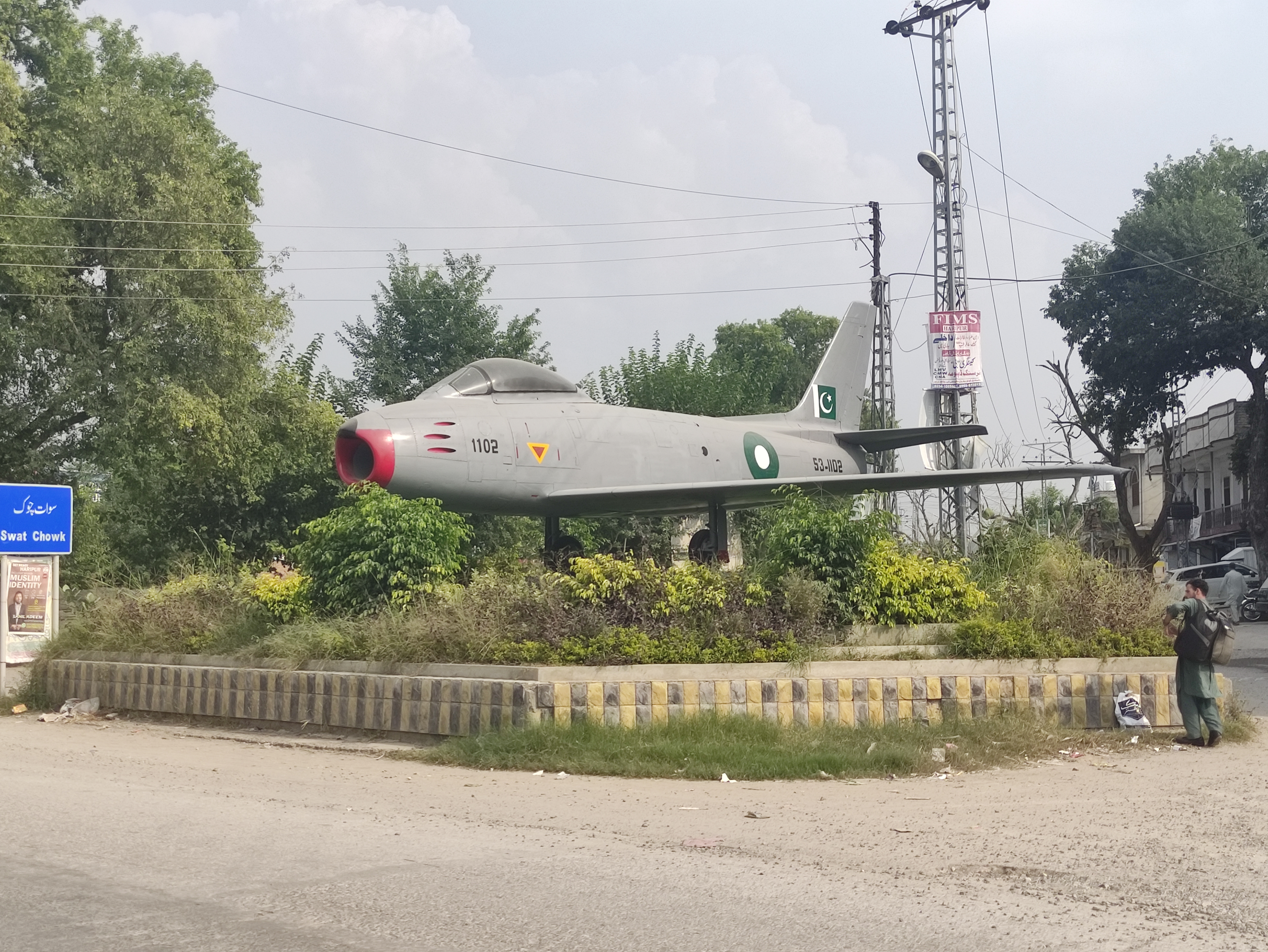
A retired PAF North American F-86F Sabre now on display at Haripur District

North American F-86 Sabre

- 31-125, on display at PAF Base Nur Khan
- 52-5031, on display at Murree.
- 53-216, on display at Multan
- 53-1102, on display at Swat chowk, Haripur district
- 55-4998, on display at Faisalabad.

Canadair Sabre (Note: The Canadair Sabres were known as the F-86E in the PAF, which is why they are named like that in the sources)

- 1705, On display at Faisalabad.
- 1709, on display at Fizagat Recreation Park in Mingora.
- 1792, on display at PAF Museum
- 1797, on display at Karachi

=== Philippines ===
F-86D

- 52-4140, on display wearing Centennial Livery at the Philippine Air Force Aerospace Museum, Pasay City.The one with this number preserved at Colonel Jesus Villamor Air Base is actually 52-10015.
- 69411, on display at the Armed Forces of the Philippines Museum, Quezon City.
- 51-8436, on display as Gate Guard in 8th Fighter Squadron aka "Night Fighters" Livery at the Basa Air Base, Floridablanca, Pampanga .

F-86F

- 52-4468, on display at the Philippine Air Force Aerospace Museum, Pasay City.
- 11363/52-4428, on display with name "Budjak" at the Basa Air Base, Floridablanca, Pampanga .
- 24317, aka "Banug nan Kantilan" on display at Cantilan Town Plaza. Cantilan, Surigao del Sur.
- 51-13468, on display wearing Blue Diamond Livery at the Basa Air Base, Floridablanca, Pampanga .
- 52-4845, On display at Mactan–Benito Ebuen Air Base, Lapu Lapu City Cebu, wearing Ghost Grey Livery.
- 52-5158 is mounted on a pole along the Flight Line wearing Air Superiority Silver Livery at Basa Air Base, Floridablanca, Pampanga .

=== Russia ===
CA-27 Mk.32

- A94-949 - on display with USAF markings at Technical Museum of Vadim Zadorozhny, Krasnogorsky District, Moscow Oblast.

=== Saudi Arabia ===
F-86F

- Royal Saudi Air Force Museum, Riyadh.

=== Serbia ===
F-86D

- 14102 Museum of Aviation, Belgrade.

F-86E

- 11025 Museum of Aviation, Belgrade.
- 11054 Museum of Aviation, Belgrade.
- 11088 Museum of Aviation, Belgrade.

=== Slovenia ===
On Display
IF-86D

- 14325 Pivka Park of Military History

F-86D

- 14307 Cerklje ob Krki Airport

=== South Africa ===
A retired SAAF Sabre on display at the South African Air Force Museum, Ysterplaat

Airworthy

CL-13B Mk6

- 367 "E" – stored at South African Air Force Museum, AFB Swartkop, Pretoria.

On display

CL-13B Mk6

- 361 "F" – South African Air Force Museum, AFB Swartkop, Pretoria.
- 372 (Mocked up as "601 Sherdanor II", ex USAF 52-4352) - South African Air Force Museum, AFB Ysterplaat, Cape Town

=== South Korea ===
On Display

F-86D

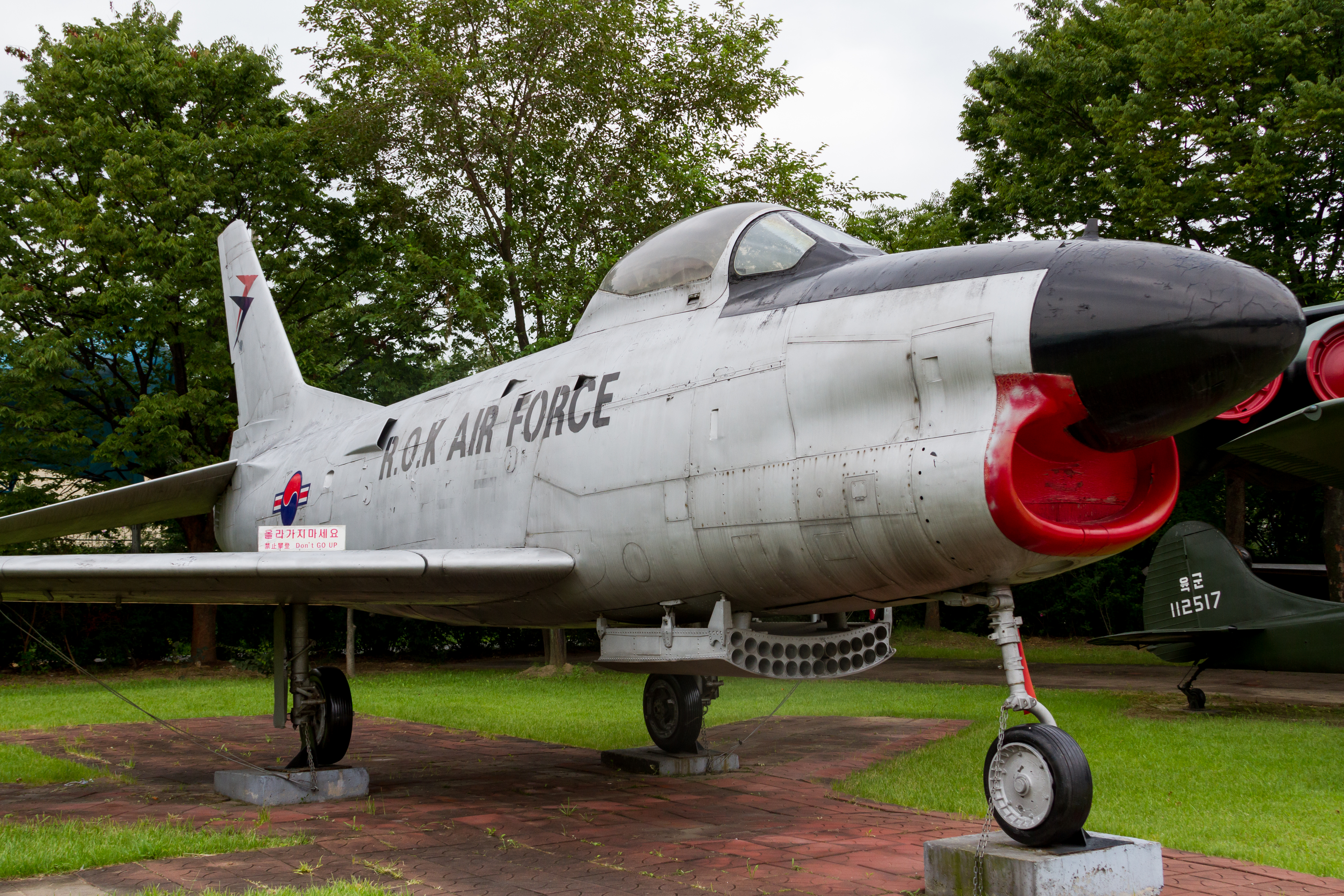
An F-86D Sabre on display at the War Memorial of Korea

- Jeju Aerospace Museum
- 51-8424 - KAI Aerospace Museum
- Korea Air Force Academy
- 51-2910 – USAF 51st Fighter Wing area, Osan Air Base, South Korea
- Suwon Air Base
- 51-8502 – War Memorial of Korea

F-86F

- Boramae Park
- Daejeon National Cemetery
- Jeju Aerospace Museum
- 52-4865 - KAI Aerospace Museum
- Korea Air Force Academy
- National Aviation Museum of Korea
- Suwon Air Base
- Unification Hall, jeju
- War Memorial of Korea

=== Spain ===
On display

- F-86F C.5-82 at Torrejón, Spain.
- F-86F C.5-58 at Museo del Aire de Cuatro Vientos, Spain.
- F-86F C.5-175 at Museo del Aire de Cuatro Vientos, Spain.
- F-86F C.5-231 at Morón, Spain.
- F-86F C.5-101 at Valencia, Spain

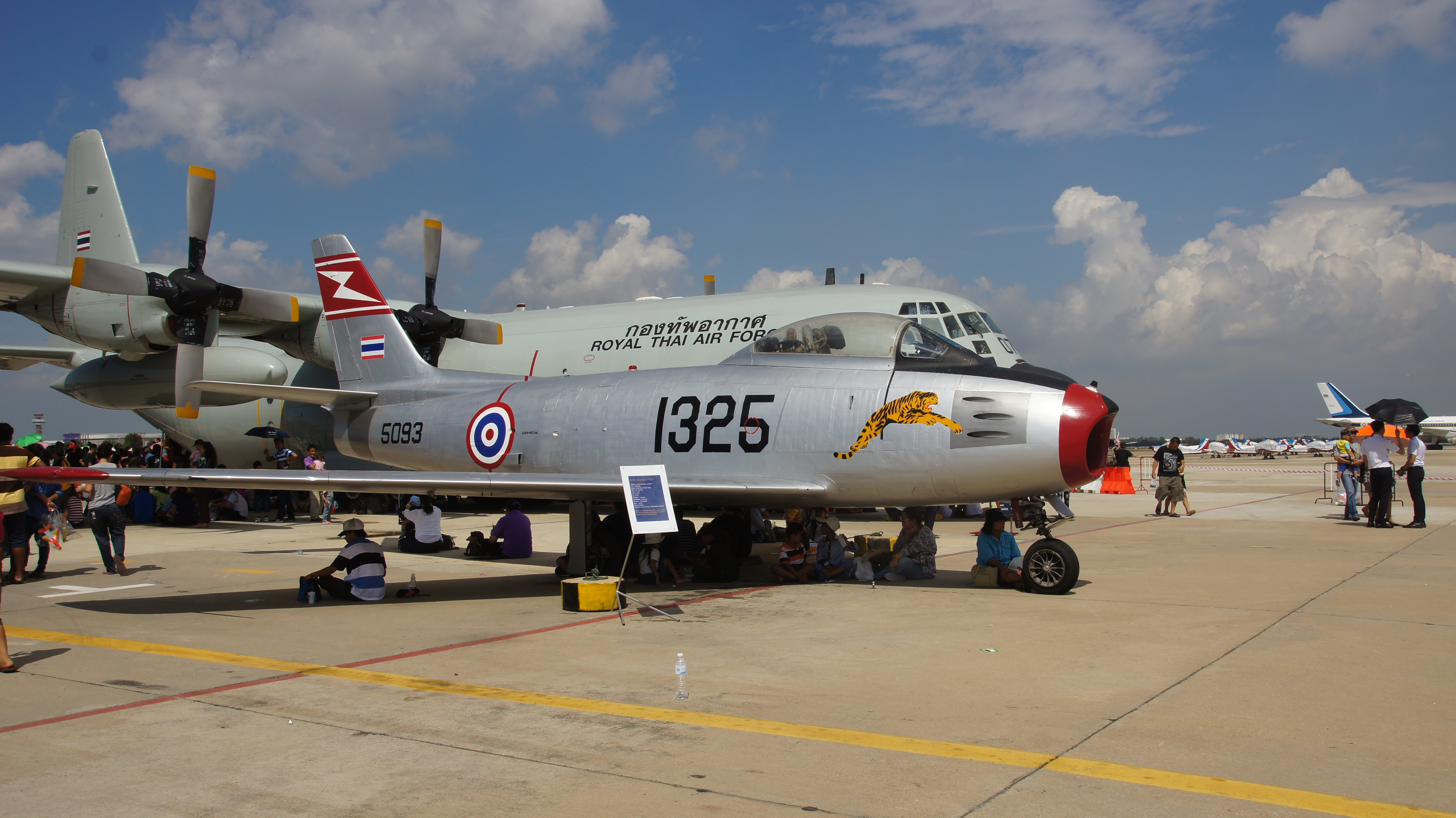
F-86F 1325 at Don Mueang

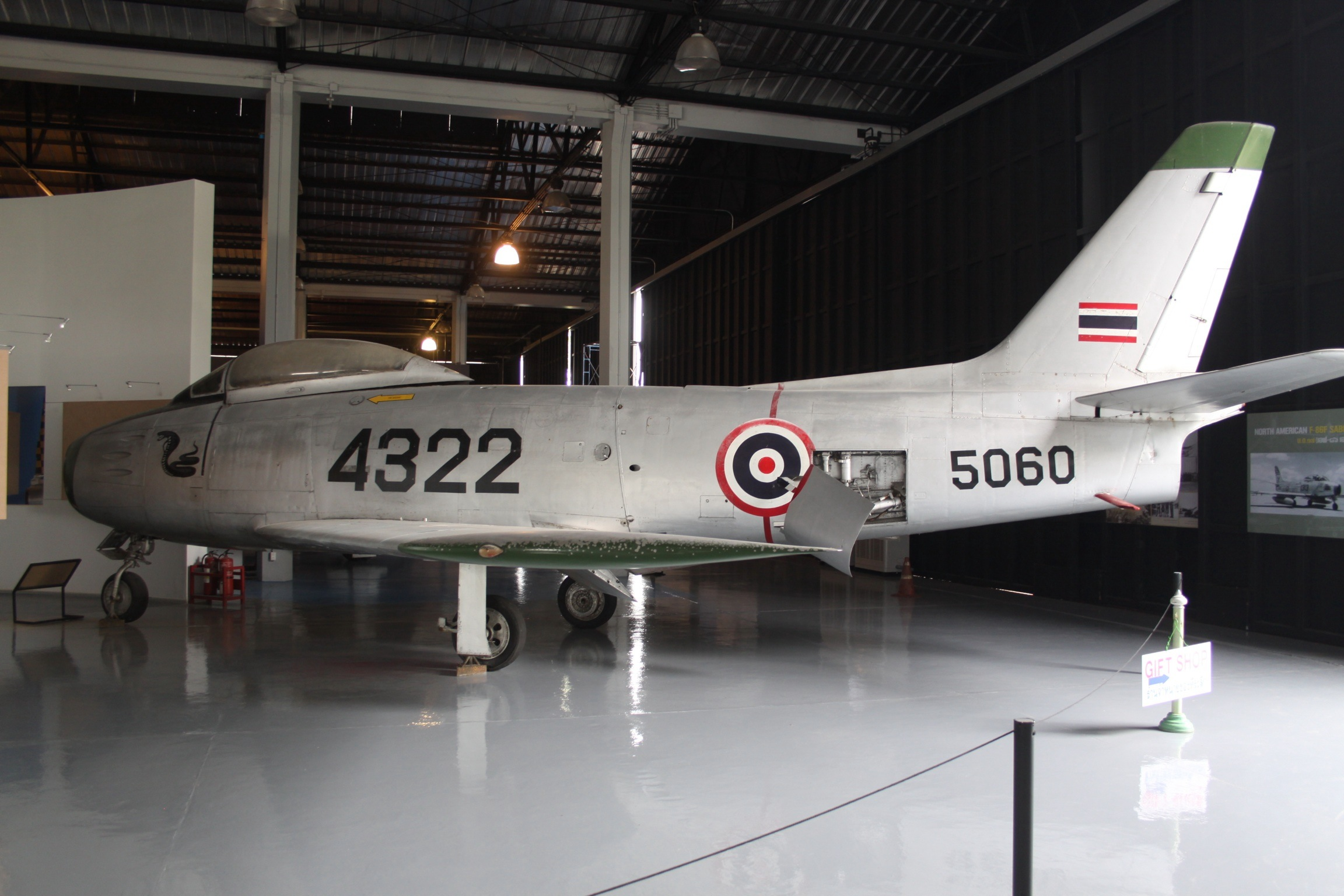
F-86F 4322 at the RTAF Museum, Don Mueang

- F-86F C.5-71 at Aeronautical Museum of Catalonia (Sabadell Airport), Spain.

=== Taiwan ===
On display

RF-86

- 6134 at public park close to Taiwanese Air Defense HQ in Taipei

=== Thailand ===
F-86F

- At Korat RTAFB, Nakhon Ratchasima.
- 1926 at Lopburi – Army Aviation Center (VTBH), Thailand.
- At Lopburi – Army Aviation Center (VTBH), Thailand.
- 4313 at the Bangkok – National Science Centre for Education, Thailand
- 1314 at Bangkok Don Muang International Airport (DMK / VTBD), Thailand.
- 4342 at Takhli RTAFB (TKH / VTPI), Thailand.
- 1211 at Bangkok – National Science Centre for Education, Thailand.
- 1315 at the RTAF Academy, Thailand.
- 1362 at Khok Kathiam (KKM / VTBL), Thailand.
- 1325 at Bangkok Don Muang International Airport (DMK / VTBD), Thailand.
- 1425 at Bangkok Don Muang International Airport (DMK / VTBD), Thailand.
- 4345 at Chiang Mai – International (CNX / VTCC), Thailand.
- 4334 at Bangkok Don Muang International Airport (DMK / VTBD), Thailand.
- 5032 at Chiang Mai – International (CNX / VTCC), Thailand.
- 4322 at the RTAF Museum RTAF Base Don Mueang

F-86L

- 1213 at Nakhon Nayok
- 1215 at Don Mueang
- 1232 at the RTAF Academy, Bangkok, Thailand.
- 1214 at Thanon Phahon, Yothin Town, Thailand.

=== Turkey ===
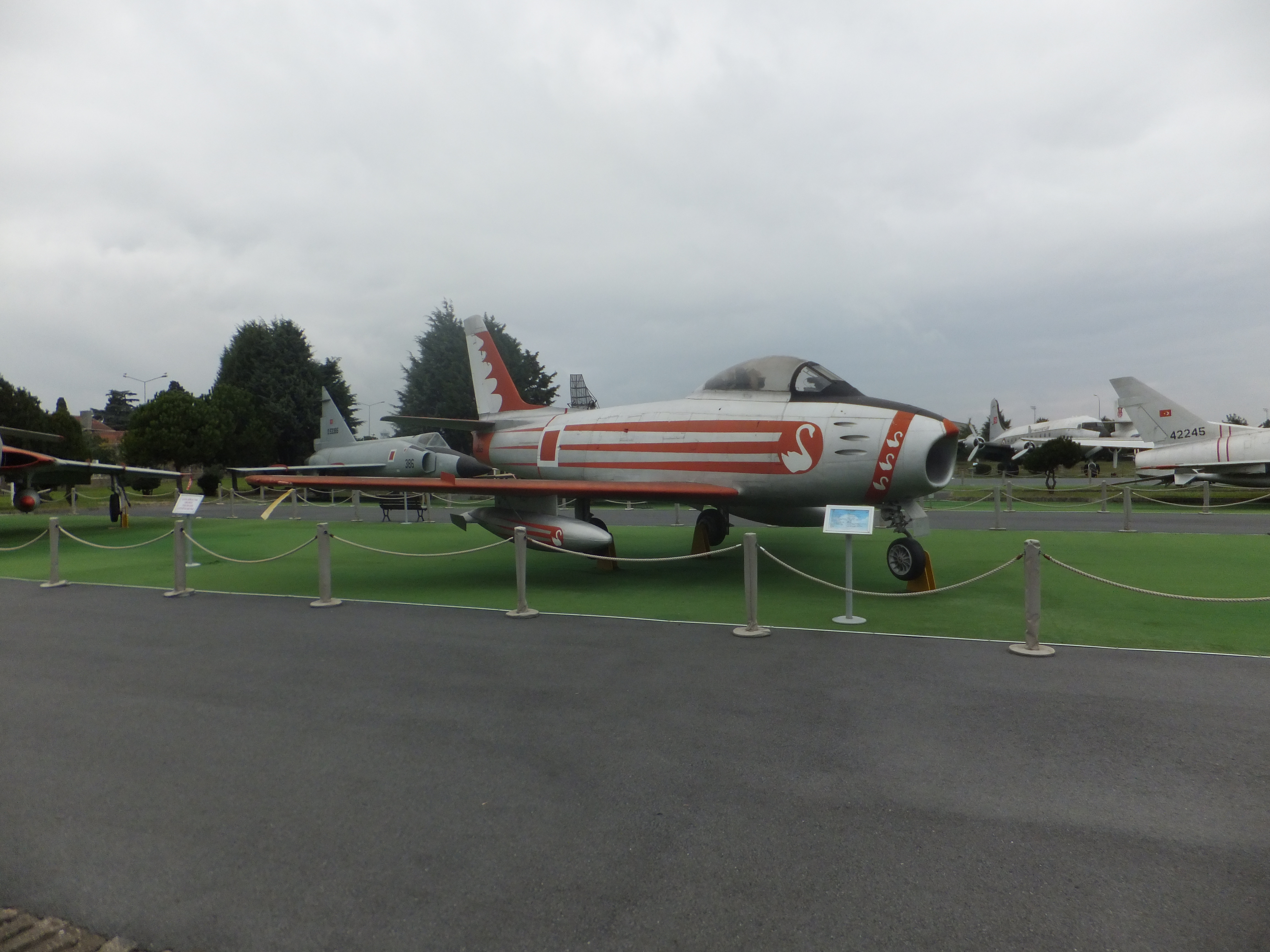
Turkish F-86F at Istanbul Aviation Museum.

- F-86F 19268 at Istanbul Aviation Museum.
- F-86E 19207/207 at Istanbul Aviation Museum.

=== United Kingdom ===
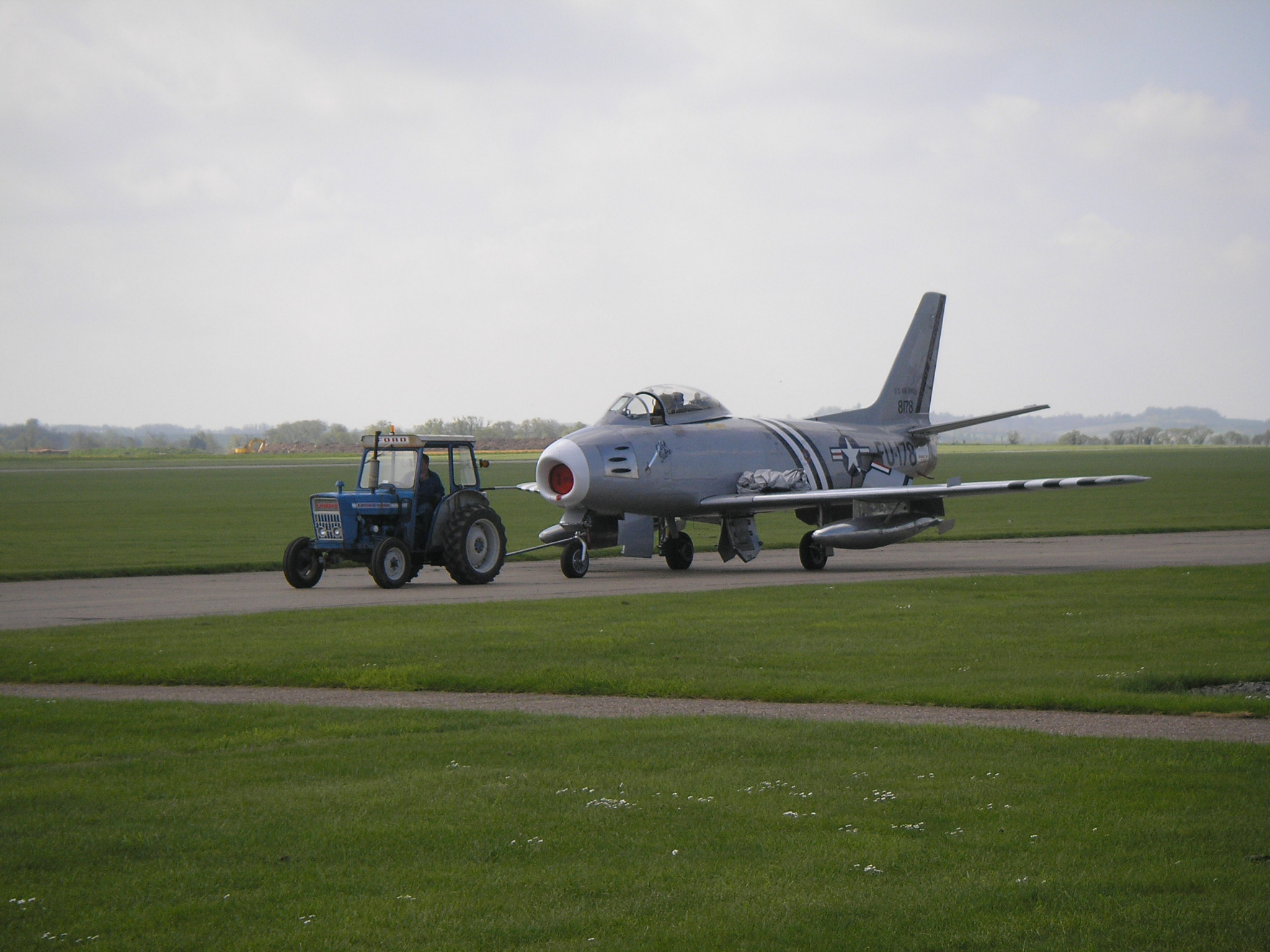
48-0178 being towed by a tractor at Imperial War Museum Duxford.

On Display

F-86A

- 48-0242 – Midland Air Museum, England.

CL-13 Sabre Mk. IV

- XB812 – Royal Air Force Museum Cosford.

F-86D

- 51-6171 – North East Land, Sea and Air Museums, Sunderland. It is the only 'D' model left in the UK.

=== United States ===
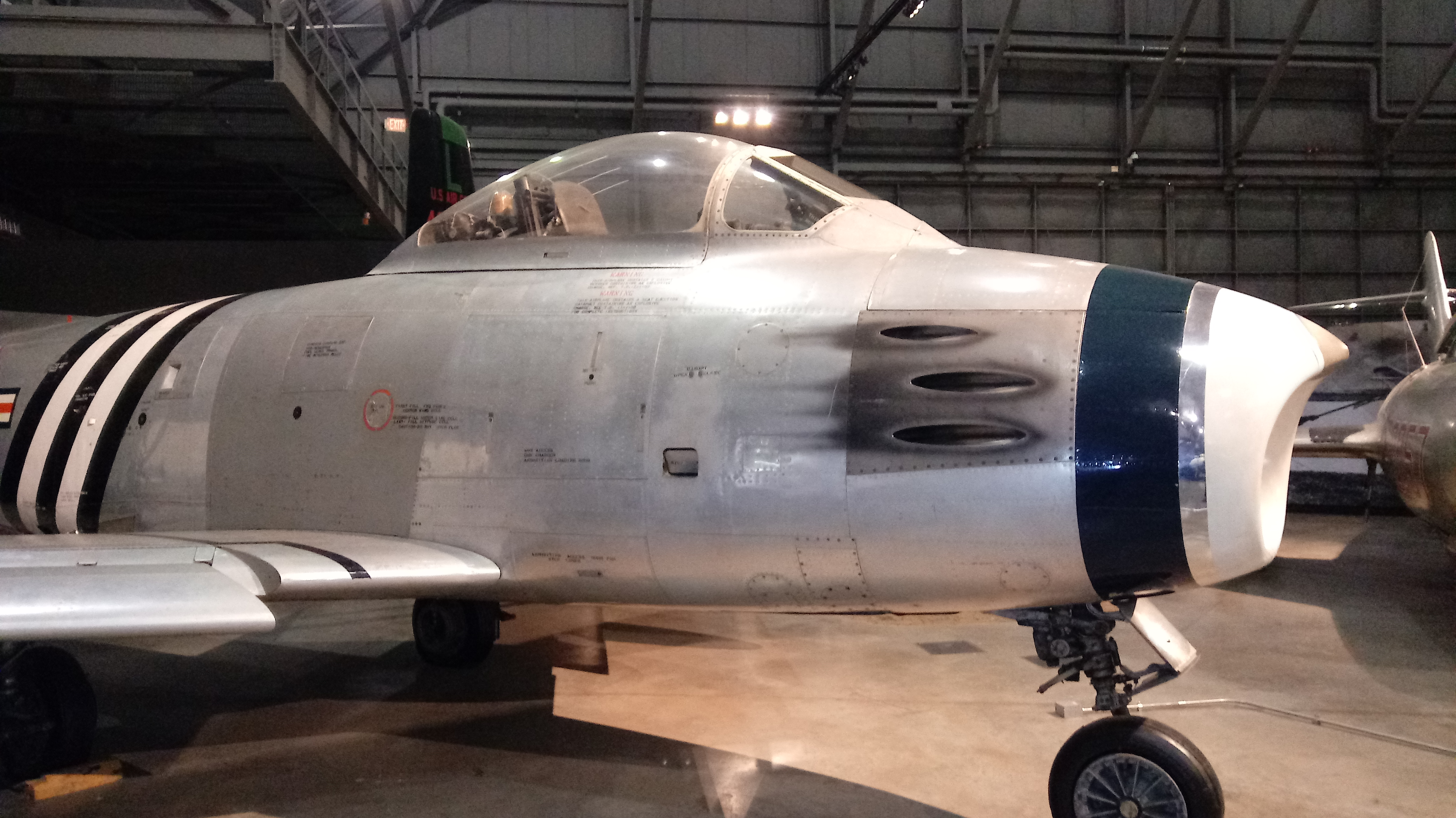
F-86A at The National Museum of the United States Air Force

Airworthy

F-86A

- N48178 (48-0178) – privately owned in Grove, Oklahoma.
- N4912 (49-1217) – based at the Flying Heritage Collection in Everett, Washington.

F-86F

- N51RS (51-13417) – based at the Mid-Atlantic Air Museum in Reading, Pennsylvania.
- N860AG (52-4666) – privately owned in Houston, Texas.
- N86NA (52-4731) – privately owned in Grand Prairie, Texas.
- N86FR (52-4959) (painted as 53-1201) – privately owned in Palmetto Bay, Florida.
- N188RL (52-4986) – based at the Warbird Heritage Foundation in Waukegan, Illinois.
- N186AM (52-5012) – based at the Planes of Fame Museum in Chino, California.
- N286CF (52-5116) – privately owned in Wellington, Florida.
- N86F (52-5139) – privately owned in Indianapolis, Indiana.

Canadair CL-13 Mk.5

- N87FS (RCAF23285) – privately owned in Belgrade, Montana.
- N4869H (RCAF23293) – based at the Cavanaugh Flight Museum in Addison, Texas. Removed from public display when the museum indefinitely closed on 1 January 2024. To be moved to North Texas Regional Airport in Denison, Texas.
- N386BB (RCAF23314) – privately owned in Melbourne Beach, Florida.
- N8686F (RCAF23363) – based at the Museum of Flight in Seattle, Washington.

Canadair CL-13 Mk.6

- N1FT (RCAF23671) – privately owned in Houston, Texas. It is painted as Hell-Er Bust X with the s/n of 51-2756.
- N3842H (RCAF23682) – based at the Yanks Air Museum in Chino, California.
- N106JB (RCAF23684) – based at the War Eagles Air Museum in Santa Teresa, New Mexico.
- N38453 (RCAF23697) – privately owned in Mojave, California.
- N50CJ (RCAF23700) – privately owned in Waukesha, Wisconsin.
- N186PJ – based at Lewis Air Legends in San Antonio, Texas.

On display

F-86A

- 47-0605 – Lackland AFB, San Antonio, Texas.
- 47-0615 – Fort Wayne Air National Guard Station, Fort Wayne, Indiana. Formerly at Octave Chanute Aerospace Museum (former Chanute AFB), Illinois; On loan from the United States Air Force Museum.
- 47-0637 – 120th Airlift Wing complex, Great Falls ANGB, Great Falls, Montana.
- 48-0260 – National Air and Space Museum, Washington, DC.
- 48-0281 – Fairchild AFB, Spokane, Washington.
- 49-1046 – Naval Base Ventura County, at the entrance to the Channel Islands Air National Guard Station in Point Mugu, California34°08′38″N 119°06′40″W
- 49-1067 (displayed as 49-1236) – National Museum of the United States Air Force, Wright-Patterson AFB, Dayton, Ohio.
- 49-1095 – Selfridge Military Air Museum, Selfridge ANGB, Mount Clemens, Michigan.
- 49-1195 – Elmendorf AFB (North Side), Anchorage, Alaska.
- 49-1272 – 144th Fighter Wing complex, Fresno Air National Guard Base, Fresno, California.
- 49-1301 (displayed as 51-2760) – Maxwell Air Force Base Air Park, Alabama.

F-86D

- 50-0477 (display as 52-3863 Dennis the Menace) – National Museum of the United States Air Force, Wright-Patterson AFB, Dayton, Ohio.
- 51-5915 – San Carlos Intermediate School, San Carlos, Arizona. Faded markings indicate previous assignment to then-125th Fighter-Interceptor Group of the Florida Air National Guard.
- 51-5938 – Army Legion Home, Appleton, Wisconsin.
- 51-6069 – Berryman War Memorial Park, Bridgeport, Washington.
- 51-6261 (painted as 52-10115) – Chandler City Park, Chandler, Arizona.
- 51-8409 – Oklahoma ANGB – 138th FG, Tulsa, Oklahoma.
- 51-8455 – Twinning Park, Monroe, Wisconsin.
- 52-3653 – Pueblo Weisbrod Aircraft Museum, Pueblo, Colorado.
- 52-3669 – McChord Air Museum, McChord Air Force Base, Washington.
- 52-3679 – 134th Air Refueling Wing complex, McGhee Tyson Air National Guard Base, Maryville, Tennessee.
- 52-3735 – Crete Municipal Airport, Crete, Nebraska.
- 52-3754 (painted as 52-4043) – 45th Infantry Division Museum, Oklahoma City, Oklahoma.
- 52-3770 – Texas Military Forces Museum, Austin ANG Headquarters, Austin, Texas.
- 52-3784 – Palm View Park, West Covina, California
- 52-4243 – Southern Museum of Flight, Birmingham, Alabama.
- 53-0781 – Wadleigh Park, Vale, Oregon.
- 53-1061 – Veterans of Foreign Wars (VFW) Post 2567, Jackson, Mississippi.

F-86E

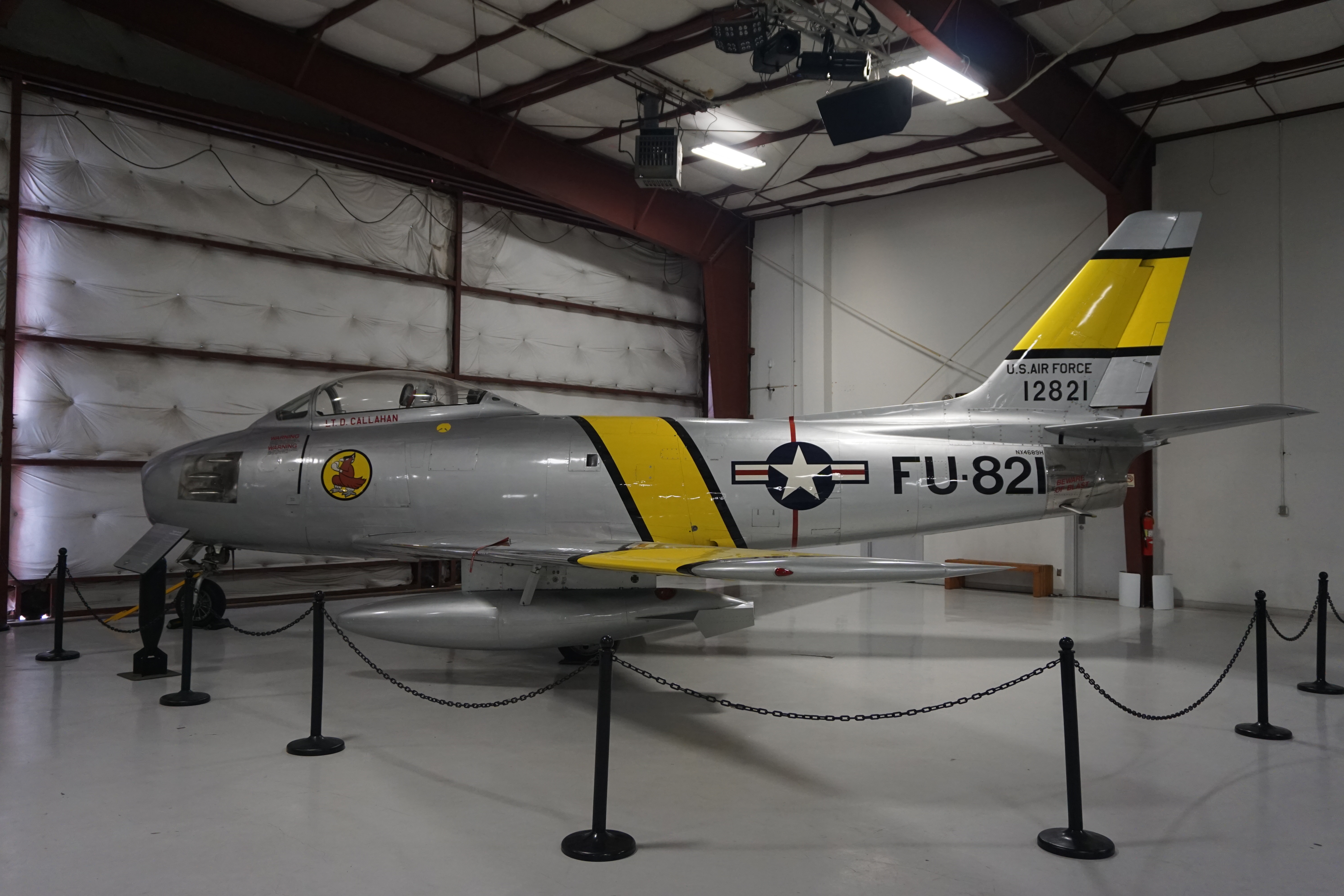
F-86E at the Cavanaugh Flight Museum

- 49-1273 (false markings, composite of several E and F models, data plate was lost) – Salt Lake City, Utah.
- 50-0593 – Veterans of Foreign Wars (VFW) Post 1798, Tulia, TX.
- 50-0600 – Pima Air & Space Museum, Tucson, Arizona.
- 50-0632 – Veterans of Foreign Wars (VFW) Post 7119, Fort Harrison, Indianapolis, Indiana.
- 50-0653 – Hickam AFB, Honolulu, Hawaii.
- 51-2841 – Pacific Aviation Museum Pearl Harbor, Pearl Harbor, Hawaii.
- 51-13010 – Nellis Air Force Base, Las Vegas, Nevada.
- 51-13028 – Holloman AFB, Alamogordo, New Mexico.
- 51-13067 – Planes of Fame, Chino, California.
- 52-2844 – Illinois Air National Guard Base, Springfield, Illinois.

F-86F

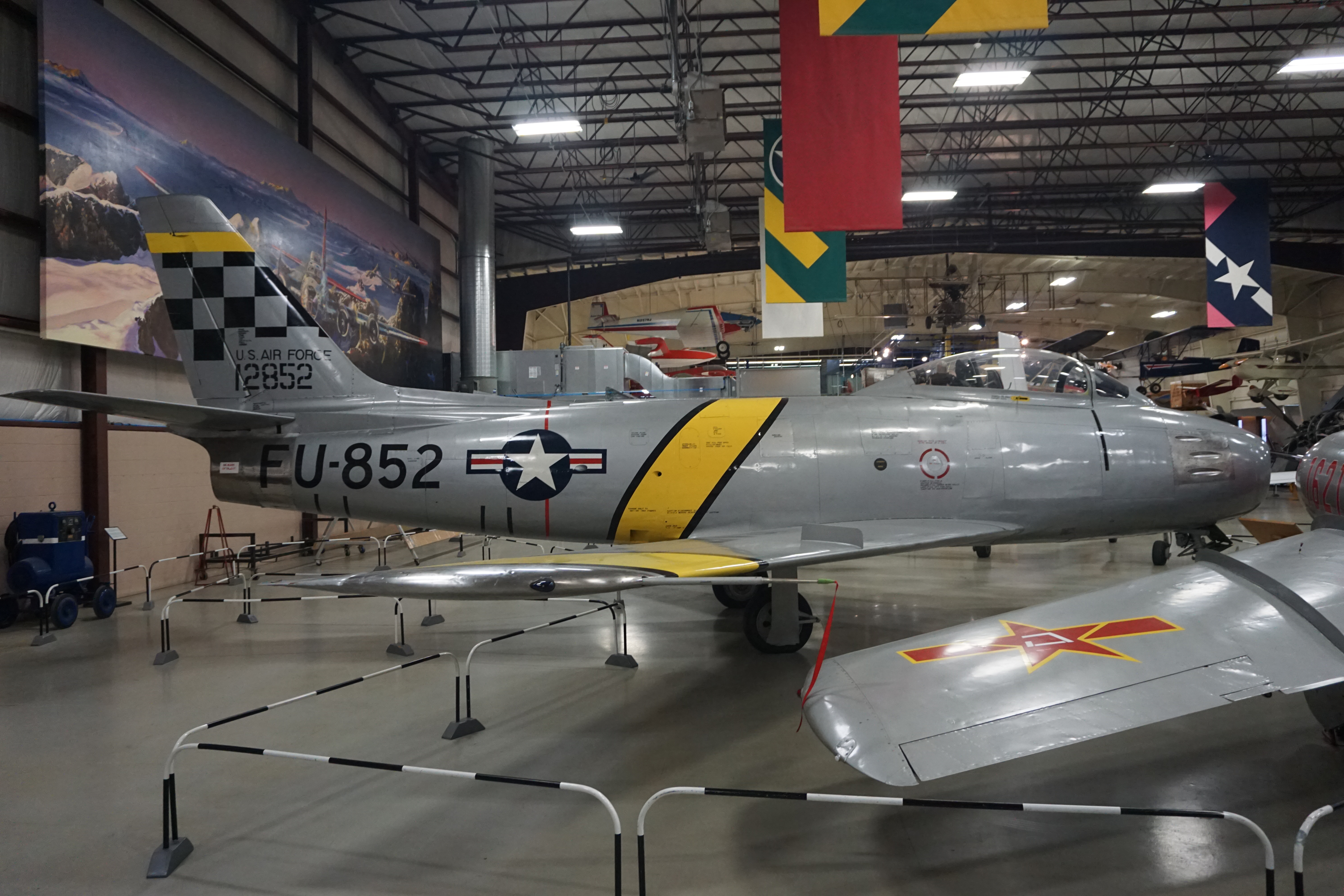
F-86F at the Air Zoo

- 51-2769 (false markings, composite of many airframes) – Warhawk Air Museum, Nampa, Idaho.
- 51-2826 – (False markings – F-86A of the Idaho Air National Guard) Idaho Military Museum, Boise, Idaho.
- 51-13082 – Aerospace Museum of California, Sacramento, California.
- 51-13278 – Morris ANGB, Tucson, Arizona.
- 51-13371 – New England Air Museum, Windsor Locks, Connecticut.
- 52-4978 – Hill Aerospace Museum, Hill AFB, Utah.
- 52-5143 – Air Zoo, Kalamazoo, Michigan.
- 52-5241 – Edwards AFB, Palmdale, California.
- 52-5323 – Luke AFB, Arizona.
- 52-5434 – Clay County Courthouse in Brazil, Indiana.
- 52-5513 (displayed as 51-2831) – Air Force Armament Museum, Eglin AFB, Florida.
- 52-9371 (false markings, real s/n unknown) – NAS Fallon, Fallon, Nevada.
- 55-3818 – Goldwater Air National Guard Base, Phoenix Airport, Phoenix, Arizona.
- 55-3937 – Western Museum of Flight, Los Angeles, California.
- 55-5014 – San Diego Air and Space Museum, Gillespie Field Annex, San Diego, California.
- 55-5035 – (displayed as 51-2734) Chico Air Museum, Restored for static display by Chico Air Museum Volunteers 2016. Displayed as "Mama Inez" flown in the Korean conflict by Lee Koenig Chico, California.
- 57-6416 – Westover Field Amador County Airport, Sutter Creek, California.

RF-86F

- 51-13390 – Air Classics Museum of Aviation, Aurora, Illinois.
- 52-4492 – National Museum of the United States Air Force, Wright-Patterson AFB, Ohio.
- 52-4758 – Estrella Warbird Museum, Paso Robles, California.
- 52-4913 – Pacific Coast Air Museum, Santa Rosa, California.

F-86H

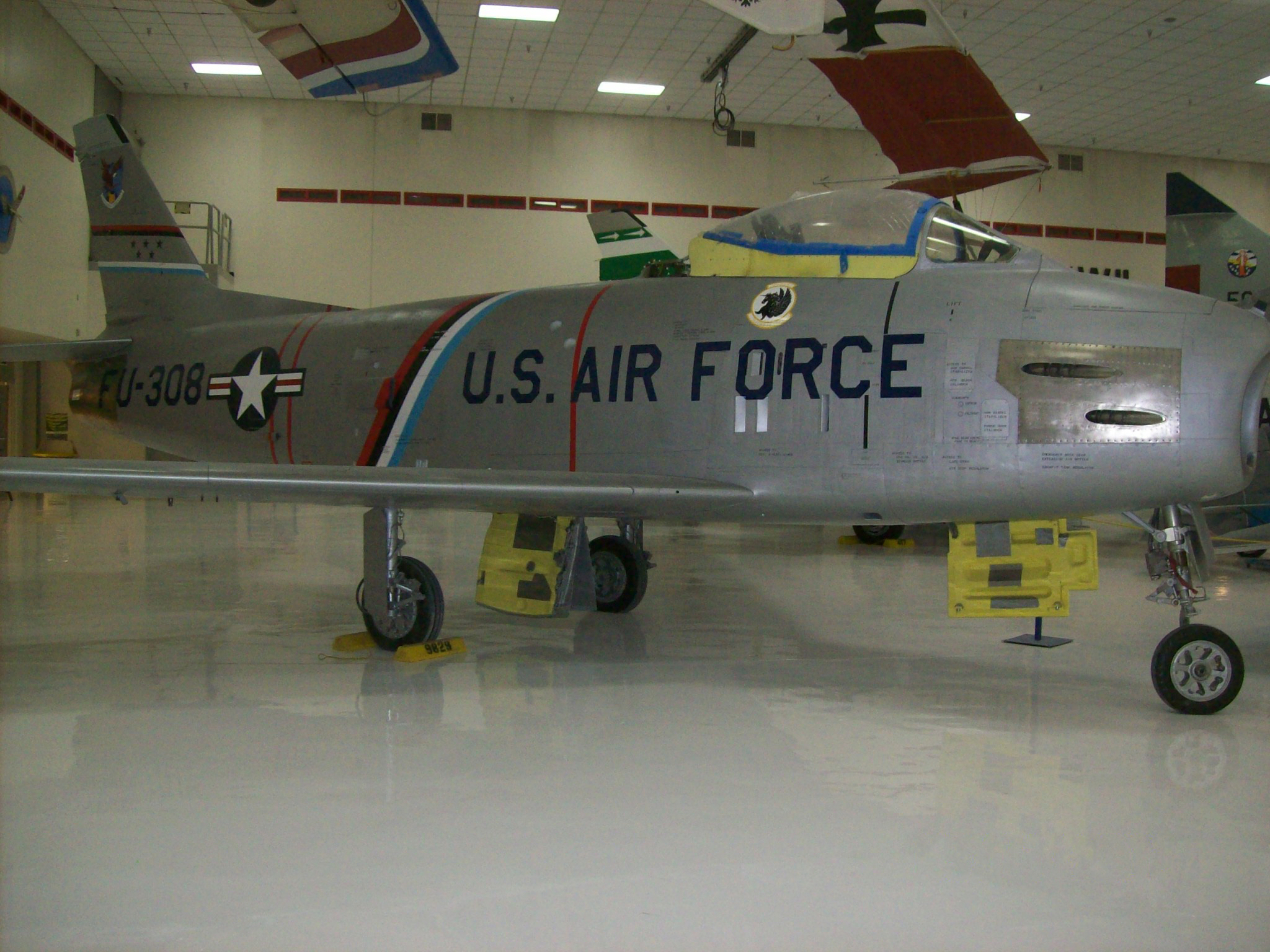
No. 308 on display at Wing Museum, Colo.

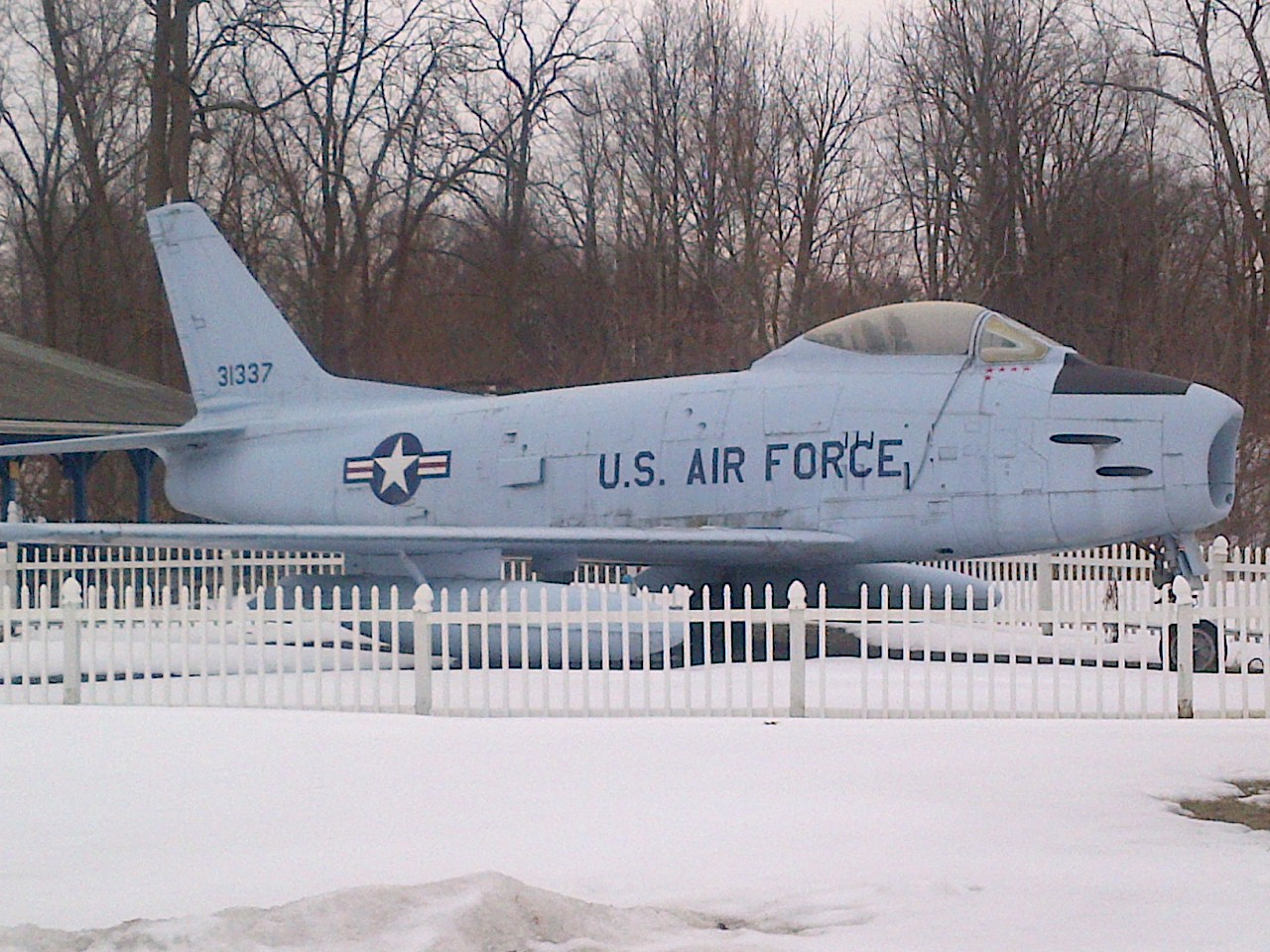
No. 337 on display at American Legion Post #34, Shortsville, NY

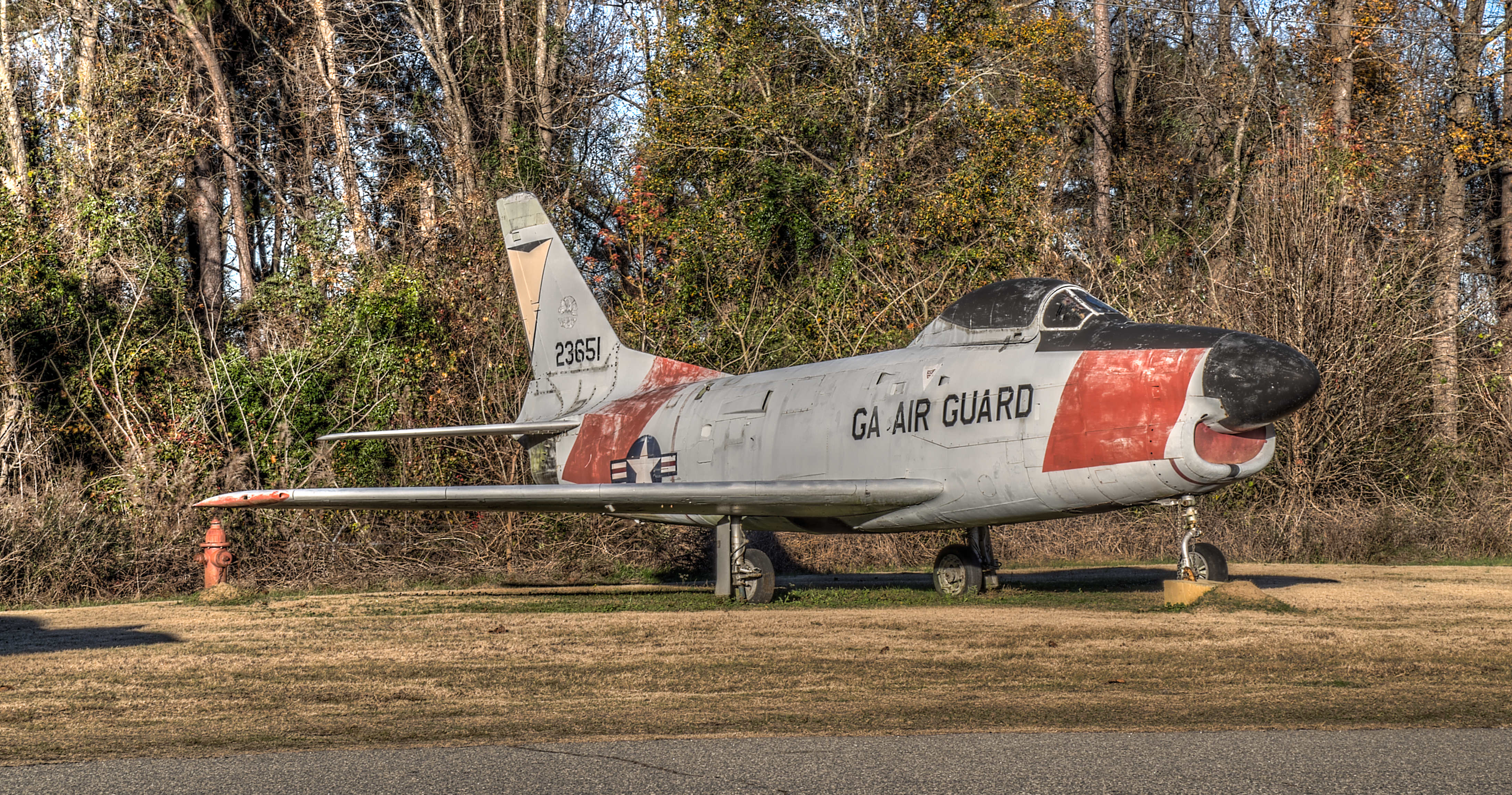
F-86 display at the Museum of Aviation, Robins AFB

- 52-1976 – Cleveland Park, Greenville, South Carolina.
- 52-1983 (displayed as 52-4812)- Vermillion County Airport, Danville, Illinois.
- 52-1993 – EAA AirVenture Museum, Oshkosh, Wisconsin.
- 52-2044 – Front Royal Warren County Airport, Front Royal, Virginia.
- 52-2048 – Veterans of Foreign Wars (VFW) Post 7472, Ellicott City, Maryland.
- 52-2054 – Lockheed Plant 42, Palmdale, California.
- 52-2058 – Preserved by West Virginia Air National Guard, Eastern West Virginia Regional Airport, Martinsburg, West Virginia, ANG Base on field.
- 52-2090 – Museum of Flying, Los Angeles, California.
- 52-5737 – Veterans Memorial Park, Burlington Township, New Jersey.
- 52-5747 (displayed as 53-1483) – Tactical Air Command Memorial Park, Langley AFB, Virginia.
- 53-1230 – Castle Air Museum, former Castle AFB, Atwater, California.
- 53-1239 – Barnes Air National Guard Base, Westfield, Massachusetts. It was on display at the Pate Museum of Transportation in Cresson, Texas before that museum shutdown.
- 53-1250 – Lakeville Veterans Memorial, Lakeville, Minnesota.
- 53-1251 – Cannon AFB Memorial Park, Cannon AFB, New Mexico.
- 53-1253 – Jamestown Regional Airport, North Dakota.
- 53-1255 – War Memorial Auditorium, Holiday Park (west side), Fort Lauderdale, Florida.
- 53-1296 – Greater Wilmington Airport/New Castle Air National Guard Base, Delaware.
- 53-1298 – Churubusco Park, Churubusco, Indiana.
- 53-1300 – Combat Air Museum at Topeka Regional Airport (Forbes Field) in Topeka, Kansas.
- 53-1302 – South Dakota Air and Space Museum, Ellsworth AFB, South Dakota.
- 53-1304 – March Field Air Museum, March ARB (former March AFB), Riverside, California.
- 53-1306 (displayed as 53-0915) – American Legion Post 915, Syracuse, New York.
- 53-1308 – Wings Over the Rockies Air and Space Museum, former Lowry AFB, Denver, Colorado.
- 53-1328 – Pacific Coast Air Museum, Santa Rosa, California.
- 53-1337 – American Legion Post 34, Shortsville, New York.
- 53-1338 – Beaver County Airport, Pennsylvania.
- 53-1339 – 175th Wing complex, Warfield Air National Guard Base, Baltimore, Maryland.
- 53-1344 – President Lincoln and Soldiers' Home National Monument, Washington D.C.
- 53-1351 – Planes of Fame, Chino, California.
- 53-1352 – National Museum of the United States Air Force, Wright-Patterson AFB, Dayton, Ohio.
- 53-1353 – Hanscom AFB, Bedford, Massachusetts.
- 53-1358 – Wisconsin National Guard Memorial Library and Museum, Volk Field, Camp Douglas, Wisconsin.
- 53-1359 – Legion Community Park, Argyle, Wisconsin.
- 53-1361 – Middlesboro – Kentucky Airport, Middlesboro, Kentucky.
- 53-1370 – Goldsboro, North Carolina.
- 53-1372 – Hettinger, North Dakota.
- 53-1375 – Strategic Air Command & Aerospace Museum in Ashland, Nebraska.
- 53-1386 – Memorial Park, McEntire Air National Guard Base, South Carolina.
- 53-1392 – Walhalla Municipal Airport, Walhalla, North Dakota.
- 53-1501 – Mid-America Air Museum, Liberal, Kansas.
- 53-1503 – McCook Army Air Base, McCook, Nebraska.
- 53-1511 – Museum of Aviation, Robins AFB, Georgia.
- 53-1515 – Apple Valley Airport, Victorville, California.
- 53-1525 – Pima Air & Space Museum, adjacent to Davis-Monthan AFB, Tucson, Arizona.

F-86L

- 50-0560 – March Field Air Museum, March ARB (former March AFB), Riverside, California.
- 51-2968 – Aerospace Museum of California, Sacramento, California.
- 51-2993 – Battleship Memorial Park, Mobile, Alabama.
- 51-3064 – Air Power Park, Hampton, Virginia.
- 51-5891 – Georgia ANGB – 165th AG, Savannah, Georgia.
- 51-6055 – Hill Aerospace Museum, Hill AFB, Utah.
- 51-6071 – Davis Monthan AFB Warrior Park, Tucson, Arizona.
- 51-6078 – City of Milton, Milton, West Virginia.
- 51-6144 – Perrin Air Force Base Museum, Denison, Texas.
- 52-3651 – Museum of Aviation, Warner Robins AFB, Macon, Georgia.
- 52-4142 – Air National Guard, Charlotte-Douglas International Airport, Charlotte, North Carolina.
- 52-4159 – Sullenberger Aviation Museum, Charlotte, North Carolina
- 52-4168 – 122nd Bomb Squadron – Jackson Barracks Military Museum, New Orleans, Louisiana.
- 52-4191 – Pacific Aviation Museum Pearl Harbor, Pearl Harbor, Hawaii.
- 52-4256 – Reflections of Freedom Air Park, McConnell AFB, Wichita, Kansas.
- 52-10052 – Crane Park in Monroe, New York.
- 52-10057 – Valdosta, Georgia.
- 52-10133 (displayed as 51-0133) – Flag Park, Tyndall AFB, Florida.
- 53-0566 – American Legion Post 353, Wild Horse Park, Mustang, Oklahoma.
- 53-0568 – Veterans Memorial Park, Winnemucca, Nevada.
- 53-0635 – Air Victory Museum, Lumberton, New Jersey.
- 53-0642 – California ANGB – 144th Fighter Wing, Fresno, California.
- 53-0658 – MAPS Air Museum, Green, Ohio.
- 53-0665 – Veterans of Foreign Wars (VFW) Post 7714, Imperial, Pennsylvania.
- 53-0668 – Berry Field ANGB, Nashville, Tennessee.
- 53-0700 – Ehlert Park, Brookfield, Illinois.
- 53-0704 – Travis AFB Heritage Center, California.
- 53-0719 – Wells Municipal Airport, Wells, Minnesota.
- 53-0750 – Iowa City Municipal Airport, Iowa.
- 53-0782 – Peterson Air and Space Museum, Peterson AFB, Colorado Springs, Colorado.
- 53-0831 – Nebraska ANGB – 155th ARG, Lincoln, Nebraska.

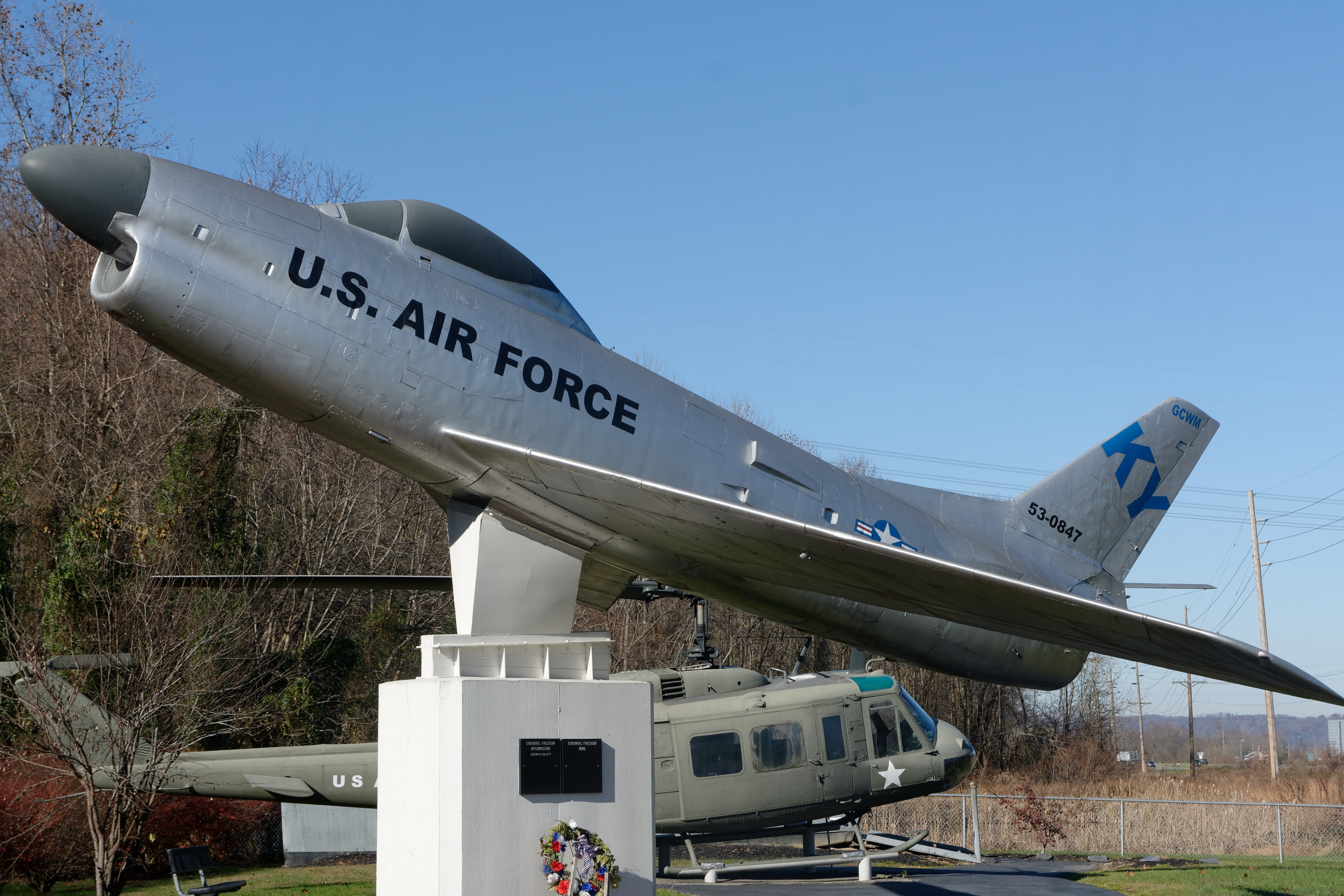
Greenup, Kentucky

- 53-0847 – County War Memorial, Greenup, Kentucky.
- 53-0894 – Pennsylvania ANGB – 171st ARW, Pittsburgh, Pennsylvania.
- 53-0965 – Pima Air & Space Museum, adjacent to Davis-Monthan AFB in Tucson, Arizona.
- 53-0997 – Bert Mooney Airport, Butte, Montana.
- 53-1022 – Fanning Field / Idaho Falls Regional Airport, Idaho Falls, Idaho.
- 53-1030 – NAS Fort Worth JRB (former Carswell AFB), Fort Worth, Texas
- 53-1045 – Historic Wendover Airfield, Wendover, Utah.
- 53-1060 – Yankee Air Museum, Belleville, Michigan.
- 53-1064 – Memorial Park, McEntire Air National Guard Base, South Carolina.
- 53-4035 – Linear Air Park / Texas Museum of Military History, Dyess AFB, Abilene, Texas.

CAC CA-27 Mk.30

- A94-916 - Clark Regional Airport, Clark County, Indiana. The true identity of this airframe is unknown. There is speculation that it is an FJ-3 Fury, as it is displayed in US Navy colors.

Canadair CL-13 Mk.5

- RCAF23147 – Pima Air & Space Museum, Tucson, Arizona.
- RCAF23226 – Former England AFB, Louisiana .
- RCAF23231 – Joe Davies Heritage Airpark at Palmdale Plant 42, Palmdale, California .
- RCAF23344 - Fairchild Air Force Base Heritage Air Park, Washington.

Canadair CL-13 Mk.6

- RCAF23226 – Former England AFB, Louisiana .

Under restoration or in storage

F-86F

- 52-4689 – to display by the National Air and Space Museum's Steven F. Udvar-Hazy Center in Chantilly, Virginia. Formerly displayed at the Vintage Flying Museum in Fort Worth, Texas.

Canadair CL-13 Mk.5

- RCAF23300 – in storage by private owner in Carson City, Nevada.

Canadair CL-13 Mk.6

- RCAF23678 – in storage by private owner in Encino, California.
