= Warbird Heritage Foundation =

U.S. non-profit organization

- Location within Illinois
- Established: 2003
- Founder: Paul Wood
- Type: Nonprofit
- Coordinates: 42.4215°N 87.8735°W
- Website: www.warbirdheritagefoundation.org

The Warbird Heritage Foundation is a non-profit organization located at the Waukegan National Airport in Waukegan, Illinois, that performs at airshows with retired military aircraft.

== History ==
The foundation was established by Paul Wood in 2003.

A P-51 owned by the foundation and flown by Vlado Lenoch was destroyed in a fatal accident in July 2017.

A Boeing B75 belonging to the foundation was damaged in an accident in 2018.

== Collection ==
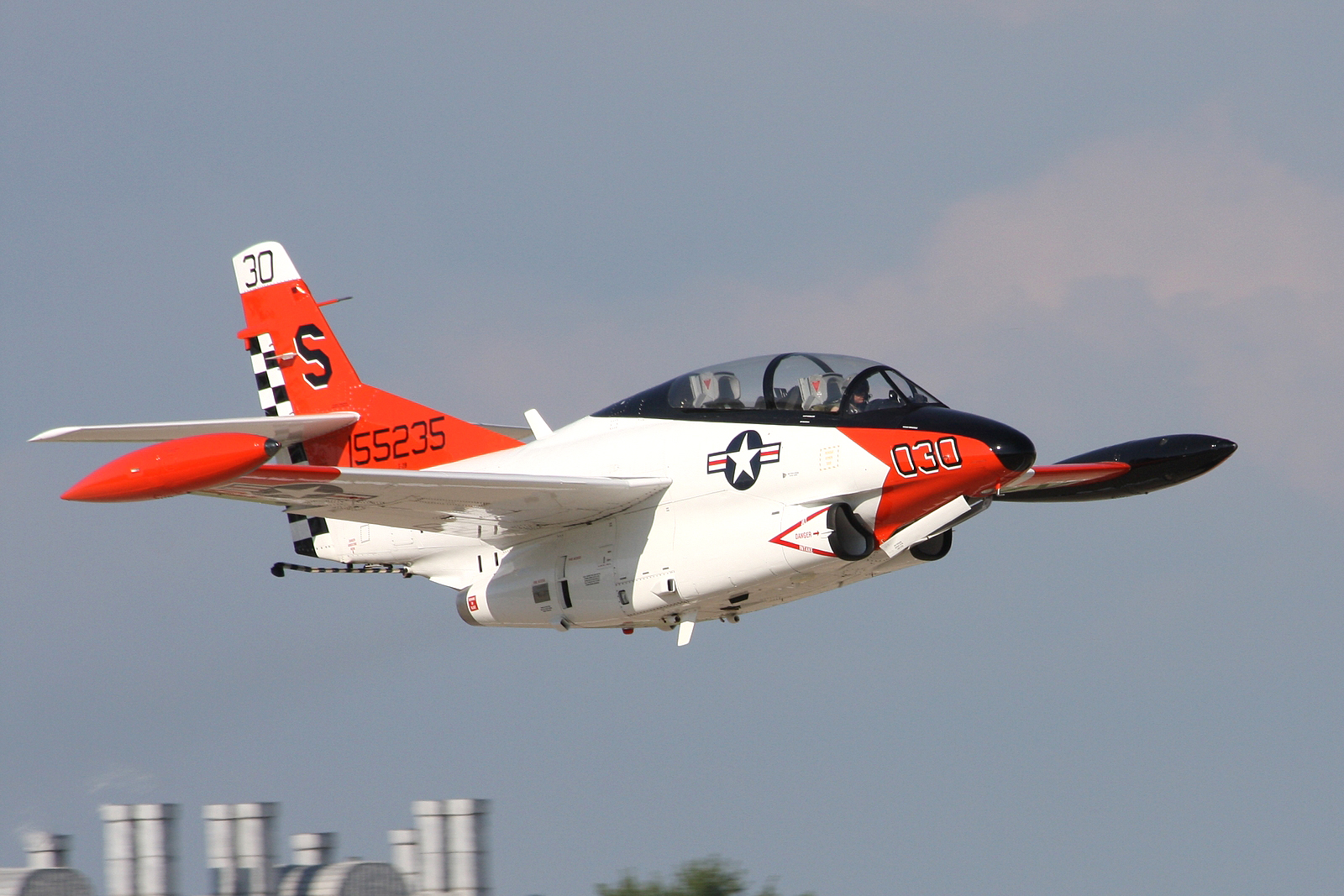
North American Rockwell T-2B Buckeye

- Aero L-39C Albatros
- Aeronca L-3B Grasshopper
- Boeing N2S-3
- Cessna L-19 Bird Dog
- Douglas A-4B Skyhawk
- Douglas AD-1 Skyraider
- Goodyear FG-1D Corsair
- Lockheed T-33A
- Nieuport 28 – replica
- North American F-86F Sabre
- North American P-51D Mustang
- North American P-51D Mustang – on loan
- North American T-2B Buckeye
- North American T-6G Texan

== Events ==
The Northern Illinois Airshow, formerly known as the Waukegan Air Show and Wings Over Waukegan, is hosted at the airport.
