= Fuji Motor Museum & Air Museum =

- 河口湖自動車博物館・飛行舘
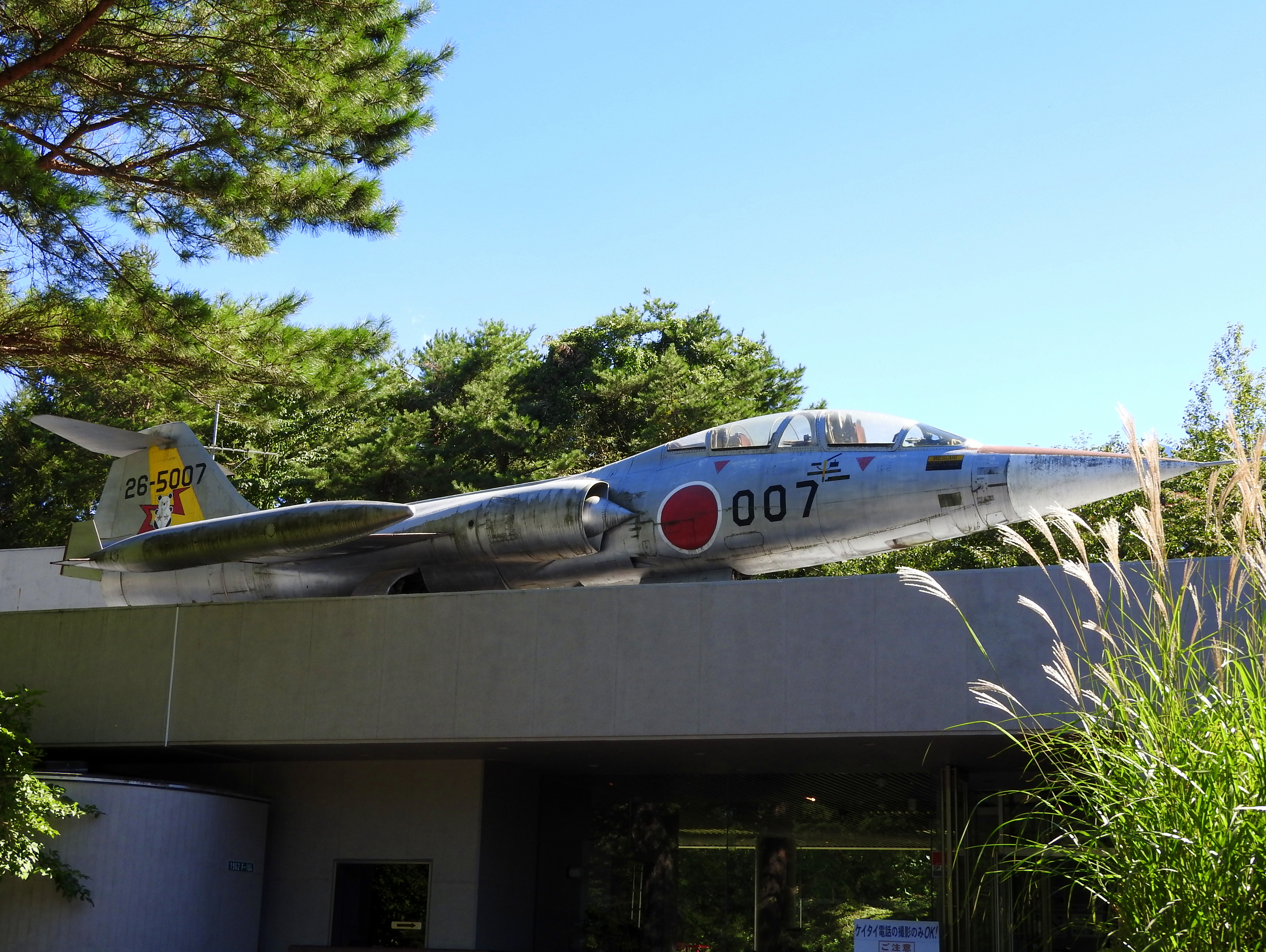
- Lockheed F-104DJ Starfighter above the museum entrance
- Former name: Kawaguchiko Motor Museum / Fighter Museum
- Established: 1981
- Location: Narusawa, Fujizakura Kogennai, Minatmitsuru-gun, Yamanashi Prefecture, Japan 401-0320
- Coordinates: 35.4532°N 138.7414°E
- Founder: Nobuo Harada
- Website: www.car-airmuseum.com

Fuji Motor Museum & Air Museum (富士自動車博物館・航空博物館, Fuji Jidōsha Hakubutsukan Kōkū Hakubutsukan) is a museum located in Yamanashi prefecture, Japan. Founded in 1981 by former race driver and businessman Nobuo Harada, it has a collection of antique motor vehicles. In 2001 it opened a new area to display a collection of 20th century military aircraft used by Japan, from Japanese Imperial Forces during World War II and the Japan Self-Defense Forces in the postwar period.

== Aircraft restorations ==
Nobuo Harada and his team made a number of trips to former Pacific battlefields and recovered a number of wrecks of Japanese aircraft from World War II. Subsequently, they restored three complete Mitsubishi A6M Zero fighters, and the skeleton of another. One of the complete aircraft is now displayed in the lobby of the Yūshūkan museum adjoining Yasukuni Shrine in Tokyo.

Harada and his team also recovered the damaged rear fuselage of a Mitsubishi G4M Betty bomber of the Imperial Japanese Navy Air Service. The forward fuselage was later built by them from scratch. The museum subsequently restored a Nakajima Ki-43 Hayabusa/Oscar fighter of the Imperial Japanese Army Air Service.

The museum was restoring a Nakajima C6N Saiun in 2022.

== Photography ==
The museum does not allow photography other than those taken by mobile phones.

== Aircraft on display ==
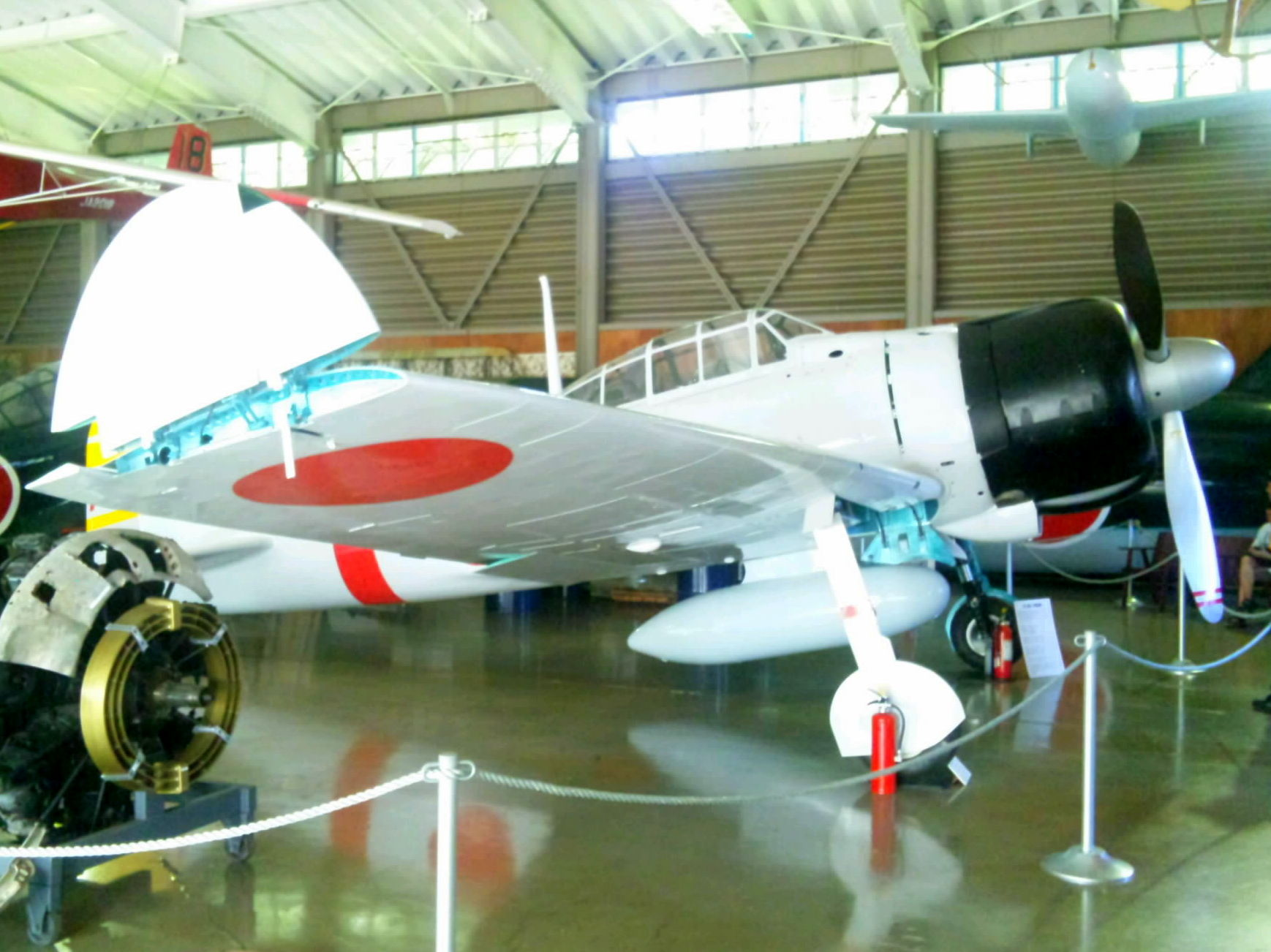
Mitsubishi A6M2 Zero

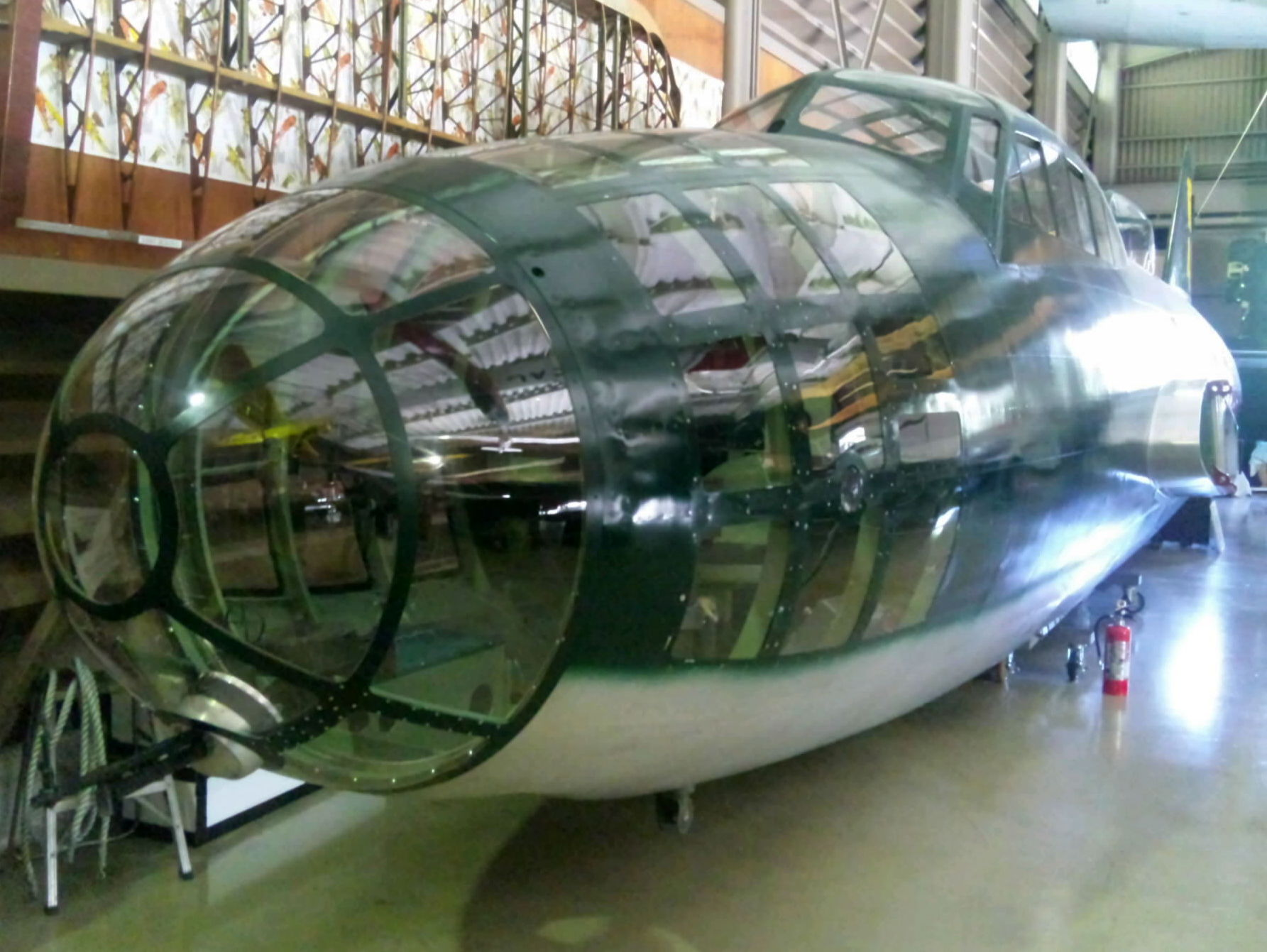
Mitsubishi G4M2 Betty

The aircraft on display can vary from year to year.

- Curtiss C-46 Commando 61-1127 (Japan Air Self-Defence Force)
- Grumman S2F-1 Tracker 4111 (United States Navy)
- Lockheed T-33A Shooting Star 51-5639 (Japan Air Self-Defence Force)
- Lockheed F-104DJ Starfighter 26-5007 (Japan Air Self-Defence Force)
- Mitsubishi A6M2 Zero Model 21 91518 (Imperial Japanese Navy Air Service)
- Mitsubishi A6M5 Zero Model 52 1493 (Imperial Japanese Navy Air Service)
- Mitsubishi G4M2 Betty 12107 (Imperial Japanese Navy Air Service)
- North American F-86F Sabre 02-7970 (Japan Air Self-Defence Force)
- North American F-86F Sabre 02-7960 (Japan Air Self-Defence Force)
- North American T-6G Texan 52-0098 (Japan Air Self-Defence Force)
- Piper L-19B Super Cub 12045 (National Safety Force)
- Sikorsky H-19C Chickasaw 51-5639 (Japan Ground Self-Defence Force)
- Wright Flyer (replica)
- Yokosuka K5Y (replica) (Imperial Japanese Navy Air Service)
- Yokosuka MXY7 Ohka (Imperial Japanese Navy Air Service)

== Access ==
The museum is open every day in August, but closed to the public for the rest of the year. It is accessible by car, and there is also a bus station for an infrequent local community bus across the street from the museum.

== See also ==
- List of aerospace museums
