= Thalaikoothal =

Killing of the elderly in Tamil Nadu, India

Thalaikoothal (Tamil: தலைக்கூத்தல், lit. 'showering') is the traditional practice of senicide (killing of the elderly) or involuntary euthanasia, by their own family members, observed in some parts of southern districts of Tamil Nadu state of India.

== Methods ==
Typically, the person is given an extensive oil-bath early in the morning and subsequently made to drink glasses of tender coconut water, which results in kidney failure, high fever, fits, and death within a day or two. This technique may also involve a head massage with cold water, which might lower body temperature sufficiently to cause heart failure. Alternative methods involve force feeding cow's milk while plugging the nose, causing breathing difficulties (the "milk therapy"), or use of poisons.

== Incidence ==
Though thalaikoothal is illegal in India, the practice has long received covert social acceptance as a form of mercy killing, and people rarely complain to the police. In some cases, the family informs their relatives before performing thalaikoothal, and occasionally the victims even request it. However, social acceptance may lead to more egregious abuses: the issue gained a higher profile in early 2010, when an 80-year-old man escaped after discovering his intended fate and heard his family members discussing how they were going to "share" his lands, and took refuge in a relative's home.

Investigation revealed the practice to be "fairly widespread" in the southern districts of Tamil Nadu. Dozens or perhaps hundreds of cases occur annually.

== Response ==
In 2010, after an exposé in Virudhunagar district, the administration set up teams of officers to monitor the senior citizens.

== Representation in modern cinema ==
- Marudhu (2016)
- K.D. Engira Karuppudurai (2019)
- Baaram (2019)
- Pani-Fever (2019)
- Thalaikoothal (2023)

== See also ==
- Ättestupa
- Granny dumping
- Lapot
- Ubasute
