= Chikuhoku =

Chikuhoku 筑北村
- Village
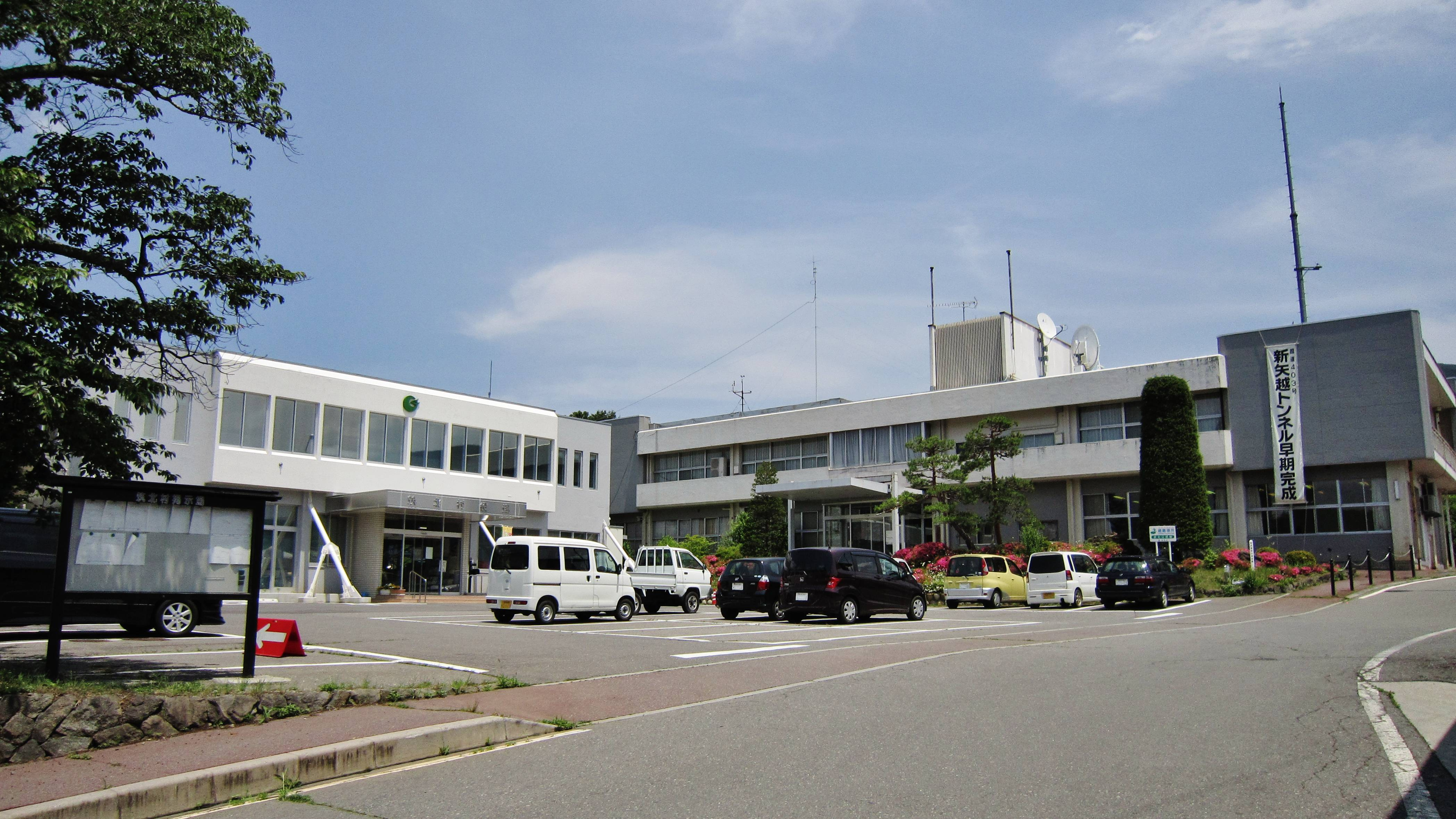
- Chikuhoku Village Hall

- Flag Seal

- Location of Chikuhoku in Nagano Prefecture

- Coordinates: 36°25′34.8″N 138°0′55″E
- Country: Japan
- Region: Chūbu (Kōshin'etsu)
- Prefecture: Nagano
- District: Higashichikuma

Government
  - Mayor: Morihiko Ota (November 2021)

Area
  - Total: 99.47 km^{2} (38.41 sq mi)

Population (February 2018)
  - Total: 4,688
  - Density: 47.13/km^{2} (122.1/sq mi)
- Time zone: UTC+9 (Japan Standard Time)
- Symbols
- Phone number: 0263-66-2111
- Address: 2187 Sakakita, Chikuhoku-mura, Higashichikuma-gun, Nagano-ken 399-7601
- Website: Official website

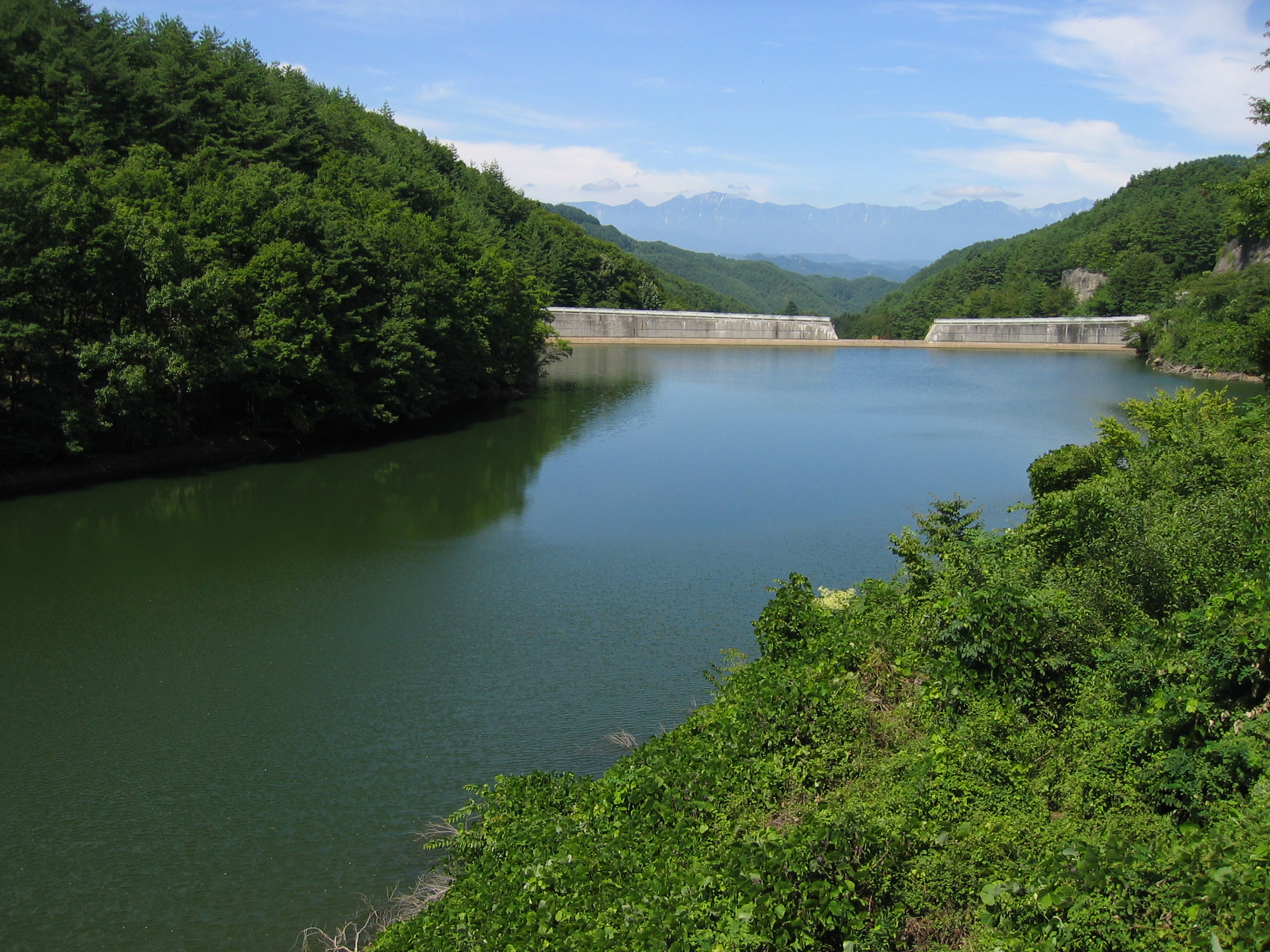
Higashijo Reservoir

Chikuhoku (筑北村, Chikuhoku-mura) is a village located in Nagano Prefecture, Japan. As of 28 February 2018, the village had an estimated population of 4,688 in 1,873 households, and a population density of 47 persons per km^{2}. The total area of the village is 99.47 square kilometres (38.41 sq mi).

== Geography ==
Chikuhoku is located in the center of Nagano Prefecture in the Matsumoto Basin. Higashijo Dam and Onikuma Dam are located in Chikuhoku.

=== Climate ===
The village has a climate characterized by cool, humid summers and cold winters (Köppen climate classification Dfa). The average annual temperature in Chikuhoku is 9.6 °C. The average annual rainfall is 2515 mm with July as the wettest month. The temperatures are highest on average in August, at around 22.4 °C, and lowest in January, at around -3.8 °C.

=== Surrounding municipalities ===
- Nagano Prefecture
  - Aoki
  - Azumino
  - Chikuma
  - Ikusaka
  - Matsumoto
  - Nagano
  - Omi
  - Ueda

== Demographics ==
Per Japanese census data, the population of Chikuhoku has decreased by more than half over the past 70 years.

Historical population
Year	Pop.	±%
1940	8,886	—
1950	11,361	+27.9%
1960	9,757	−14.1%
1970	8,105	−16.9%
1980	7,556	−6.8%
1990	7,111	−5.9%
2000	6,049	−14.9%
2010	5,172	−14.5%
2020	4,149	−19.8%

== History ==
The area of present-day Chikuhoku was part of ancient Shinano Province. Most of the area was under the control of Matsumoto Domain during the Edo period. The villages of Honjō, Sakakita, and Sakai were created with the establishment of the modern municipalities system on April 1, 1889. The village of Chikuhoku was incorporated on October 11, 2005, by a merger of the three villages.

== Education ==
Chikuhoku has three public elementary schools and one public middle school operated by the village government, and one middle school operated jointly between Chikuhoku and neighboring Omi village. The village does not have a high school.

== Transportation ==
=== Railway ===
- Shinano Railway - Shinano Railway Line
  - Nishijō - Sakakita - Hijiri-Kōgen - Kamuriki

=== Highway ===
- National Route 143
- National Route 403

== Local attractions ==
- Site of Aoyagi Castle
- Mount Kamuriki, known in Japanese folklore as the location of Mount Ubasute

== Notable people from Chikuhoku ==
- Tomio Hora, historian
