= Lapot (disambiguation) =

The lapot (Serbo-Croatian: лапот) is a legendary tradition of killing frail parents in the Serbian highlands, to avoid supporting them.

Lapot may also refer to:

- Bast shoe (ethnic name - singular: lapot; plural: lapti), a traditional shoe made from bast
- Mikoyan-Gurevich MiG-105 (codename: Russian: лапоть, romanized: Lapot, lit. 'Shoe'), a Soviet landing test vehicle for the "Spiral" spaceplane programme
- Lapot, a 1992 novel by Živojin Pavlović about the Serbian tradition
- Lapot (genus), a rhizarian genus, in the phylum Cercozoa
- Stanisław Łapot (1914–1972), Deputy Prime Minister of Poland

== See also ==
- Pot (disambiguation)
