= Kumla Church =

Kumla Church may refer to one of several churches in Sweden:

- Kumla Church, Närke
- Kumla Church, Östergötland
- Kumla Church, Västmanland
