= Mount Kamuriki =

Mountain peak in Japan

- 冠着山
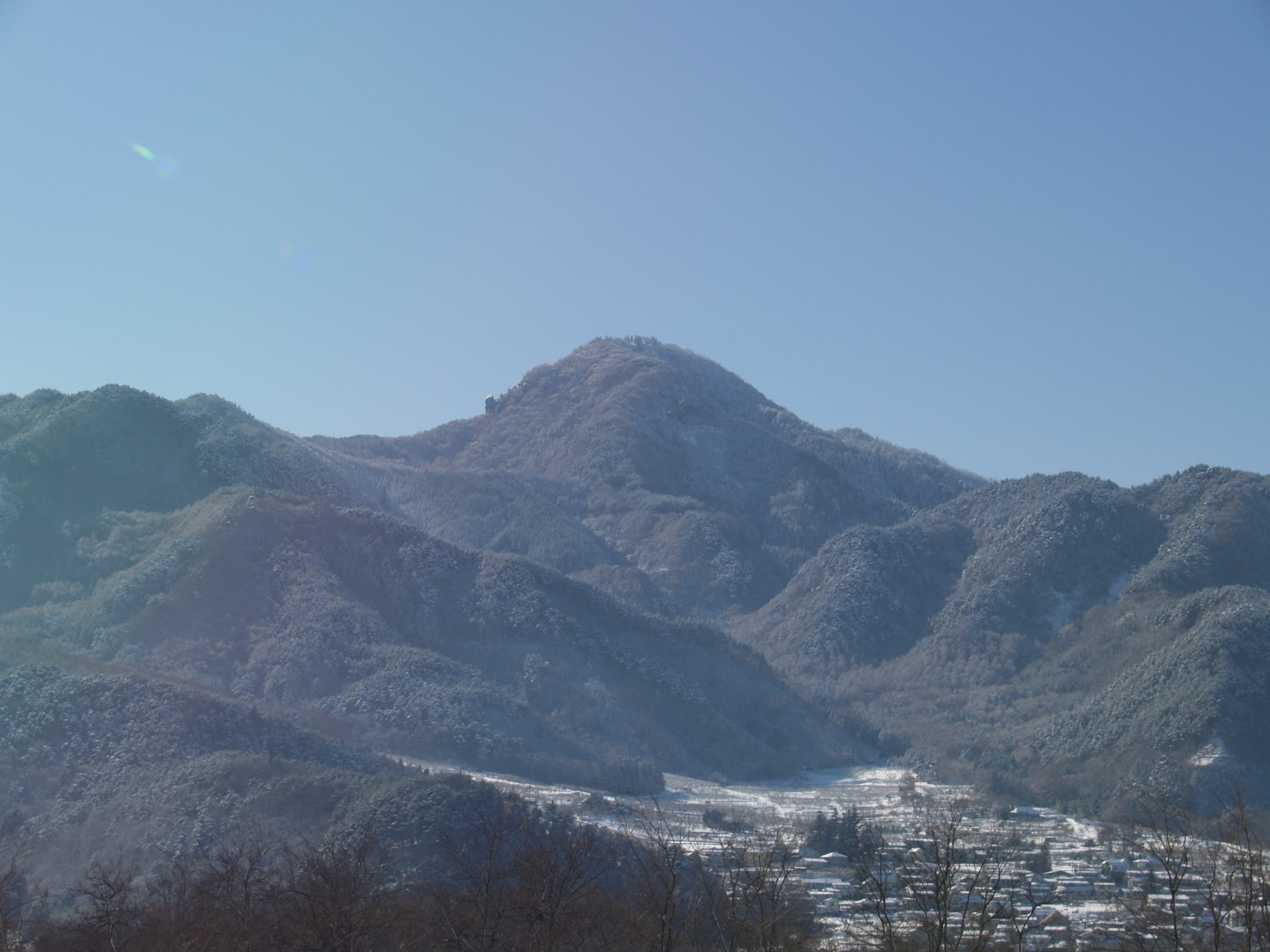

Highest point
- Elevation: 1,252 m (4,108 ft)
- Coordinates: 36°28′07″N 138°06′24″E

Geography
- Location within Nagano Prefecture Location within Japan
- Location: Chikuma and Chikuhoku, Nagano Prefecture; Japan
- Parent range: Chikuma Mountains

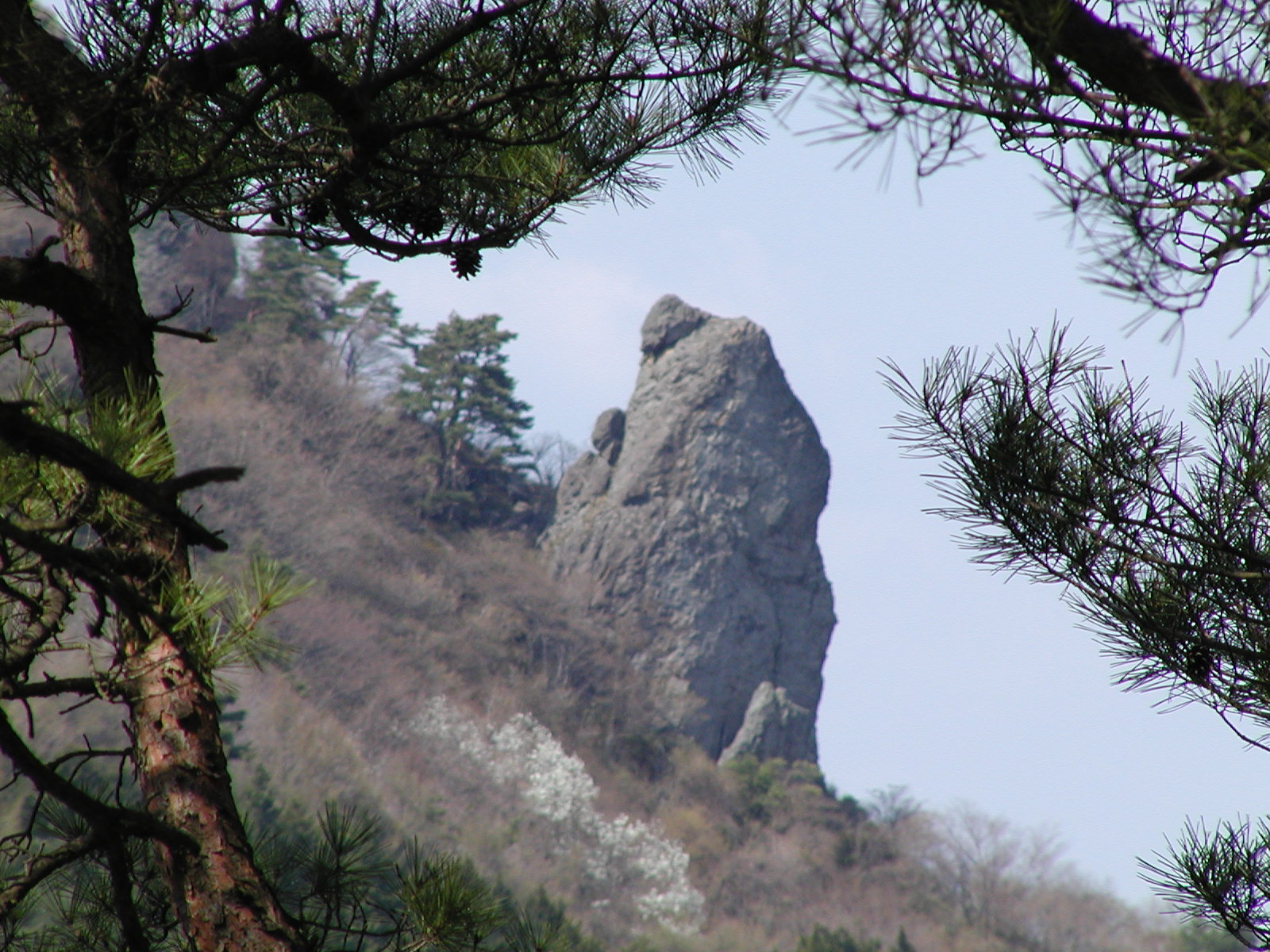
Bokodaki Iwa

Mount Kamurigi (冠着山, Kamuriki-san) is a 1,252 m (4,108 ft) mountain peak on the border of the city of Chikuma and the village of Chikuhoku in Nagano Prefecture in the Chūbu region of Japan. It is also called Ubasuteyama or Obasuteyama (姨捨山) after an old legend. the mountain is located within the borders of the Yatsugatake-Chūshin Kōgen Quasi-National Park.

== Geography ==
Mount Kamuriki is southwest of the Nagano Basin and is a Quaternary intrusion into the central uplift zone and western sedimentary zone of northern Fossa Magna where the sandstone, conglomerate and tuff deposits of the Tertiary strata were deposited during the time the area was ocean floor. The summit is a bipyrite andesite eroded lava dome, and although no direct evidence of volcanic activity exists, columnar joints can be observed on the rock on the eastern slope of the summit. A large portion of the summit collapsed during the 1847 Nagano earthquake.

== Ubasuteyama legend ==
The mountain is strongly associated with the Ubasuteyama legend, which is mentioned in the Kokin Wakashū poetry anthology of 905 AD, indicating that the legend itself was much older. Per Japanese folklore, the pre-modern Japanese practiced senicide, whereby an infirm or elderly relative who were a burden on the community were taken to a remote, desolate place, and left there to die. The identification of Mount Kamuriki as this location appears to be from legends in the Yamato Monogatari (951 AD), the Sarashina Nikki (1059 AD), and the Konjaku Monogatarishū, (c.1120 AD) among others. The mountain has a landform (the Bokodaki Iwa), which resembles a person carrying another person on his back up the mountain.

== Tagoto-no-tsuki rice terraces ==
The mountain and the Tagoto-no-tsuki rice terraces at its foothills were designated one of the National Places of Scenic Beauty of Japan in 1990. and also an Important Cultural Landscape of Japan in the year 2010. The Tagoto-no-tsuki rice terraces were developed during the mid-16th century in the middle of the Edo period, and approximately 1500 rice terraces remain in use. The area under protection by the government is approximately 40 hectares at an altitude of 460 to 560 meters. The landscape was featured in literature and painting subjects, including some haiku by Basho, especially in the Edo period.

== See also ==
- List of Places of Scenic Beauty of Japan (Nagano)
- Cultural Landscape (Japan)
- Ubasute
