= How the Killing of the Old Men Was Stopped =

Serbian fairy tale

How the Killing of the Old Men Was Stopped is a Serbian fairy tale that first appeared in Kazadzic, a journal of Serbian folklore, having been submitted by Mr. I. L. Szeckovic from Paracin. It is Aarne-Thompson type 981, "Wisdom of Hidden Old Man Saves Kingdom."

== Synopsis ==
A man hid his father in a land where everyone was supposed to be put to death at fifty. He won a bet about first seeing the sunrise by following his father's advice and looking west, so he saw it on a mountaintop. People concluded that the old should no longer be put to death.

== Motifs ==
This story type is known the world over, and although the precise problem solved by the old man differs, the lesson is invariably the same: to cherish the old as a source of wisdom.

== Variants ==
=== Antiquity ===
Justin's Historia Philippicae contains a variant in chapter XVIII,3,1.

=== Europe ===
A Maltese variant titled "The Kaukama and the Kaukam" was included by Margaret Murray and L. Galea in Maltese Folk-Tales.

"Why People Ceased to Kill Old Men," is a variant collected from the Gagauz of Moldova.

A Ukrainian variant, "How They Used to Put Old People On the Plank," was collected from an informant named Naum Savchenko.

Jung Károly published a variant collected from a female narrator in 1951.

=== Africa ===
A variant was collected from the Wala people of Ghana by Mona Fikry-Atallah.

"Impossible Against Impossible" is a Liberian variant.

=== Asia ===
In Japan, there is a legend called Ubasute or Ubasute-yama. Uba means old woman. However, in the story, sometimes be an old father type. There are two types of stories: The unreasonable question type and the branch-and-fold type.

"About The Country That Exiled People Over Seventy Years Old," in the Konjaku Monogatarishū is an Indian variant. It replaces the execution of elders with exile and a woman solves the riddles.

Keigo Seki's Folktales of Japan includes a variant, "The Mountain Where Old People Were Abandoned".
