= Omi, Nagano =

Village in Nagano Prefecture, Japan

Omi 麻績村
- Village
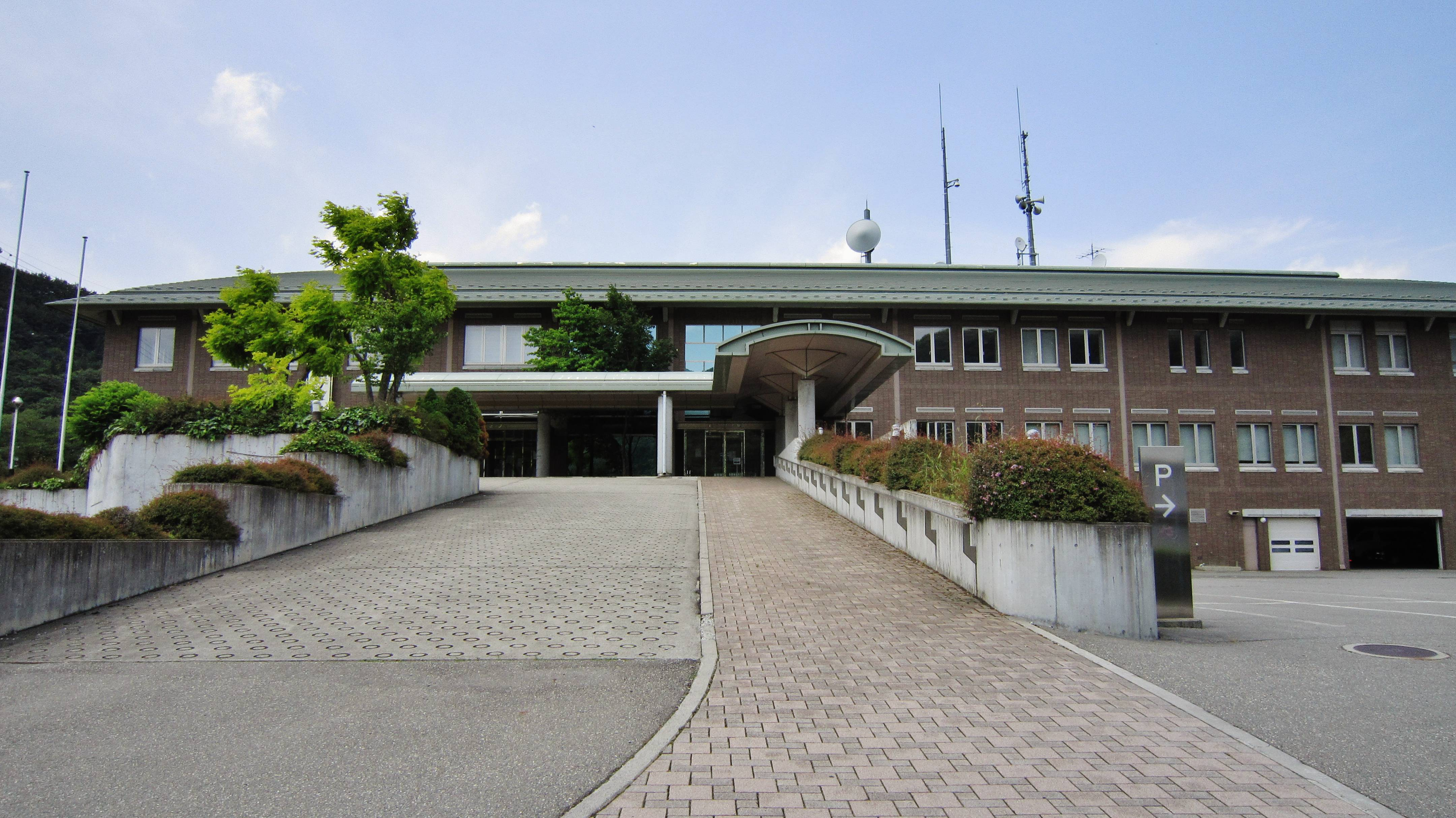
- Omi Village Hall

- Flag Seal

- Location of Omi in Nagano Prefecture

- Location within Japan
- Coordinates: 36°27′21.9″N 138°2′42.7″E
- Country: Japan
- Region: Chūbu (Kōshin'etsu)
- Prefecture: Nagano
- District: Higashichikuma

Area
  - Total: 34.38 km^{2} (13.27 sq mi)

Population (April 2019)
  - Total: 2,738
  - Density: 79.64/km^{2} (206.3/sq mi)
- Time zone: UTC+9 (Japan Standard Time)
- Symbols
  - Tree: Magnolia kobus
  - Flower: Erythronium japonicum
  - Bird: Common cuckoo
- Phone number: 0263-69-3111
- Address: 3837 Asa, Omi-mura, Higashichikuma-gun, Nagano-ken 399-7701
- Website: Official website

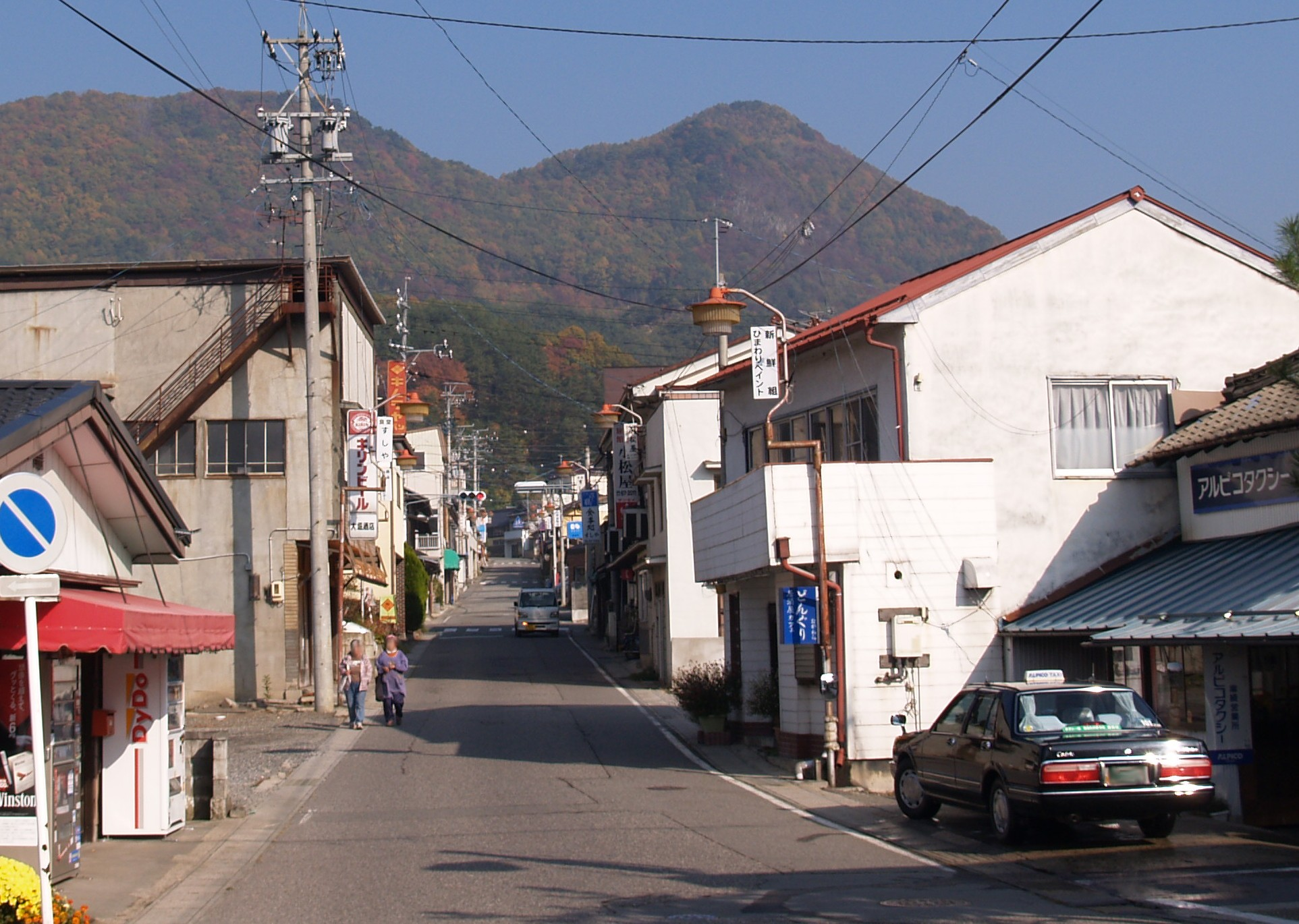
Nagano Route 429 in Omi Village

Omi (麻績村, Omi-mura) is a village located in Nagano Prefecture, Japan. As of 1 April 2019, the village had an estimated population of 2,738 in 1130 households, and a population density of 80 persons per km^{2}. The total area of the village is 34.48 square kilometres (13.31 sq mi).

== Geography ==
Omi is located in the centre of Nagano Prefecture. The Kitayama Dam and the Hijiri Highlands are located in the village.

=== Surrounding municipalities ===
- Nagano Prefecture
  - Chikuhoku
  - Chikuma
  - Ikusaka
  - Nagano

=== Climate ===
The village has a climate characterized by characterized by hot and humid summers, and cold winters (Köppen climate classification Cfa). The average annual temperature in Omi is 10.3 °C. The average annual rainfall is 1159 mm with September as the wettest month. The temperatures are highest on average in August, at around 23.7 °C, and lowest in January, at around -2.3 °C.

== Demographics ==
Per Japanese census data, the population of Omi has been declining over the past 70 years.

Historical population
Year	Pop.	±%
1940	4,819	—
1950	5,855	+21.5%
1960	5,080	−13.2%
1970	4,512	−11.2%
1980	4,016	−11.0%
1990	3,622	−9.8%
2000	3,347	−7.6%
2010	2,971	−11.2%
2020	2,593	−12.7%

== History ==
The area of present-day Ikusaka was part of ancient Shinano Province and the name of "Omi" appears in the Kamakura period Azuma kagami. The area was part of the holdings of Matsumoto Domain during the Edo period. The village of Ikusaka was established on April 1, 1889 by the establishment of the modern municipalities system. An attempt to merge with neighboring Chikuhoku was rejected by voters in 2004.

== Economy ==
The economy of the village is based on agriculture.

== Education ==
Omi has one public elementary school and one public middle school shared with the neighboring village of Chikuhoku. The village does not have a high school.

== Transportation ==
=== Railway ===
- East Japan Railway Company - Shinonoi Line
  - Hijiri-Kōgen

=== Highway ===
- National Route 403
- Nagano Expressway

== Local attractions ==
- Hijiri Museum
