= Kitayama Dam =

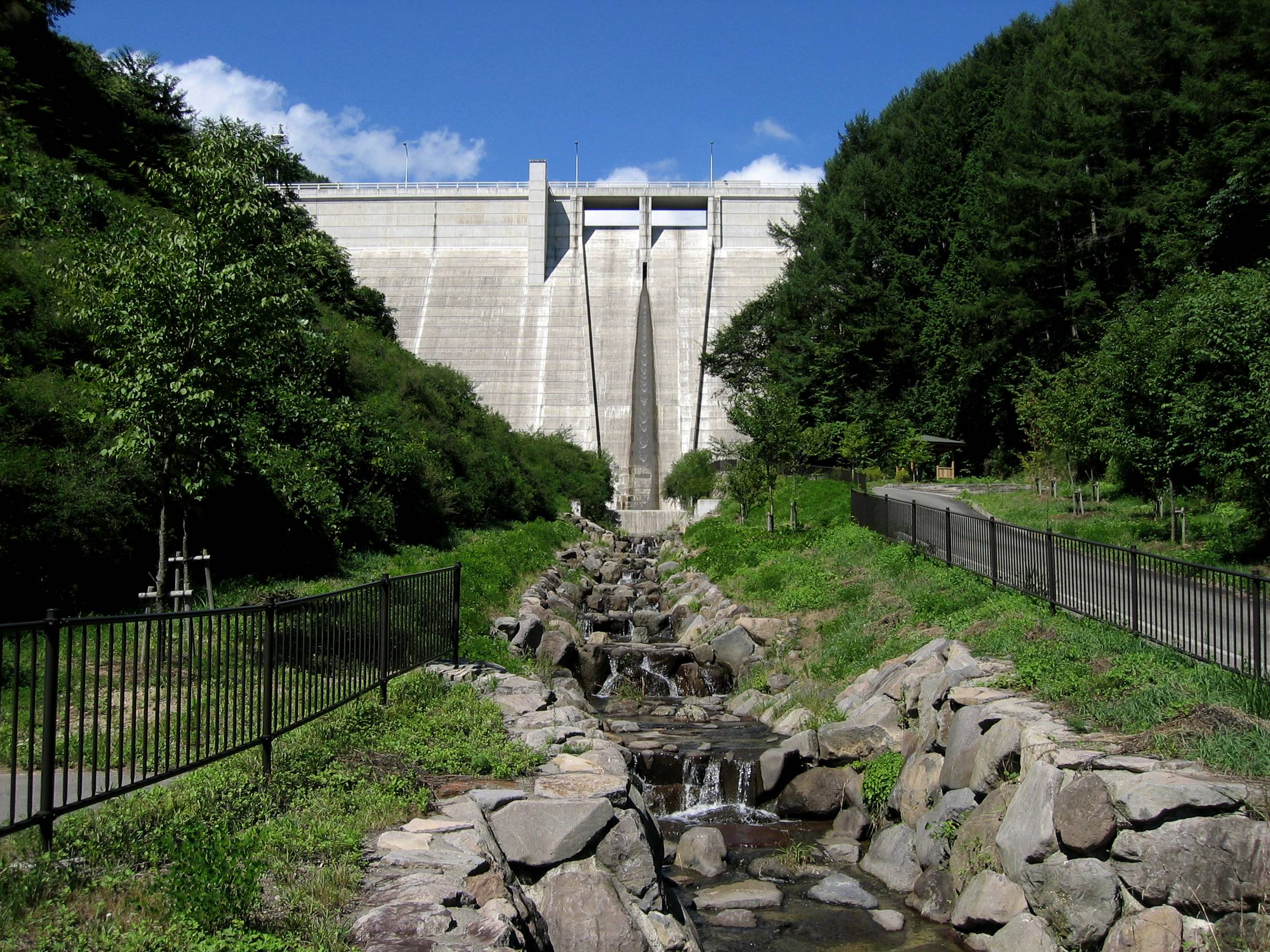

- Location within Japan
- Official name: 北山ダム
- Location: Omi, Nagano, Japan
- Coordinates: 36°28′58″N 138°3′4″E
- Construction began: 1989
- Opening date: 1999

Dam and spillways
- Type of dam: Gravity dam
- Height: 43 m (141 ft)
- Length: 109 m (358 ft)
- Dam volume: 51,000 m^{3}

Reservoir
- Total capacity: 213,000 m^{3}
- Catchment area: 1.3 km^{2}
- Surface area: 2 ha

Kitayama Dam (北山ダム, Kitayama damu) is a dam in Omi, Nagano Prefecture, Japan, completed in 1999.
