= Hijiri Museum =

Coordinates: 36.4878°N 138.0702°E

- 聖博物館
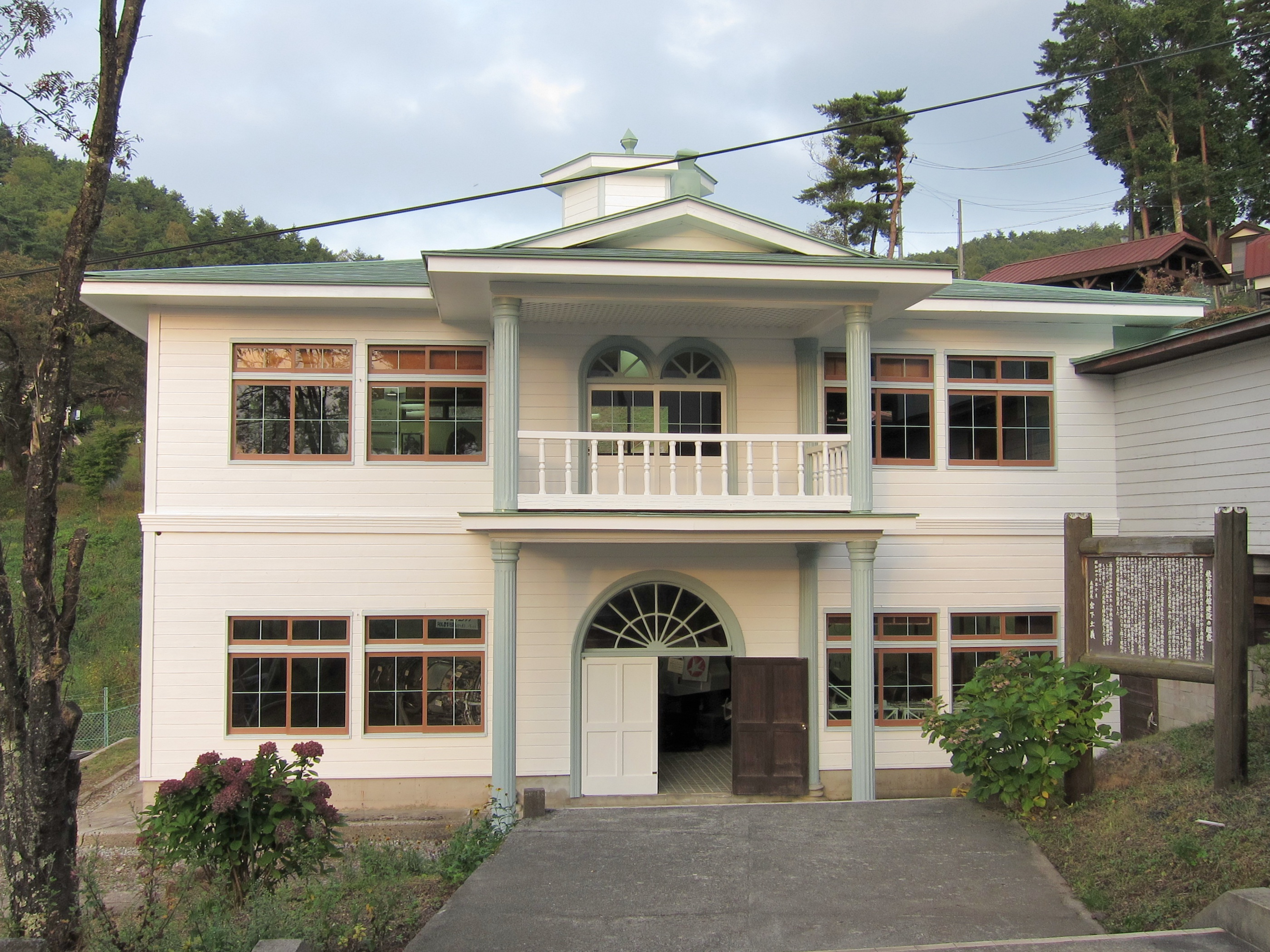
- Hijiri Aviation Museum
- Established: 20 July 1965
- Location: Omi, Nagano, Japan

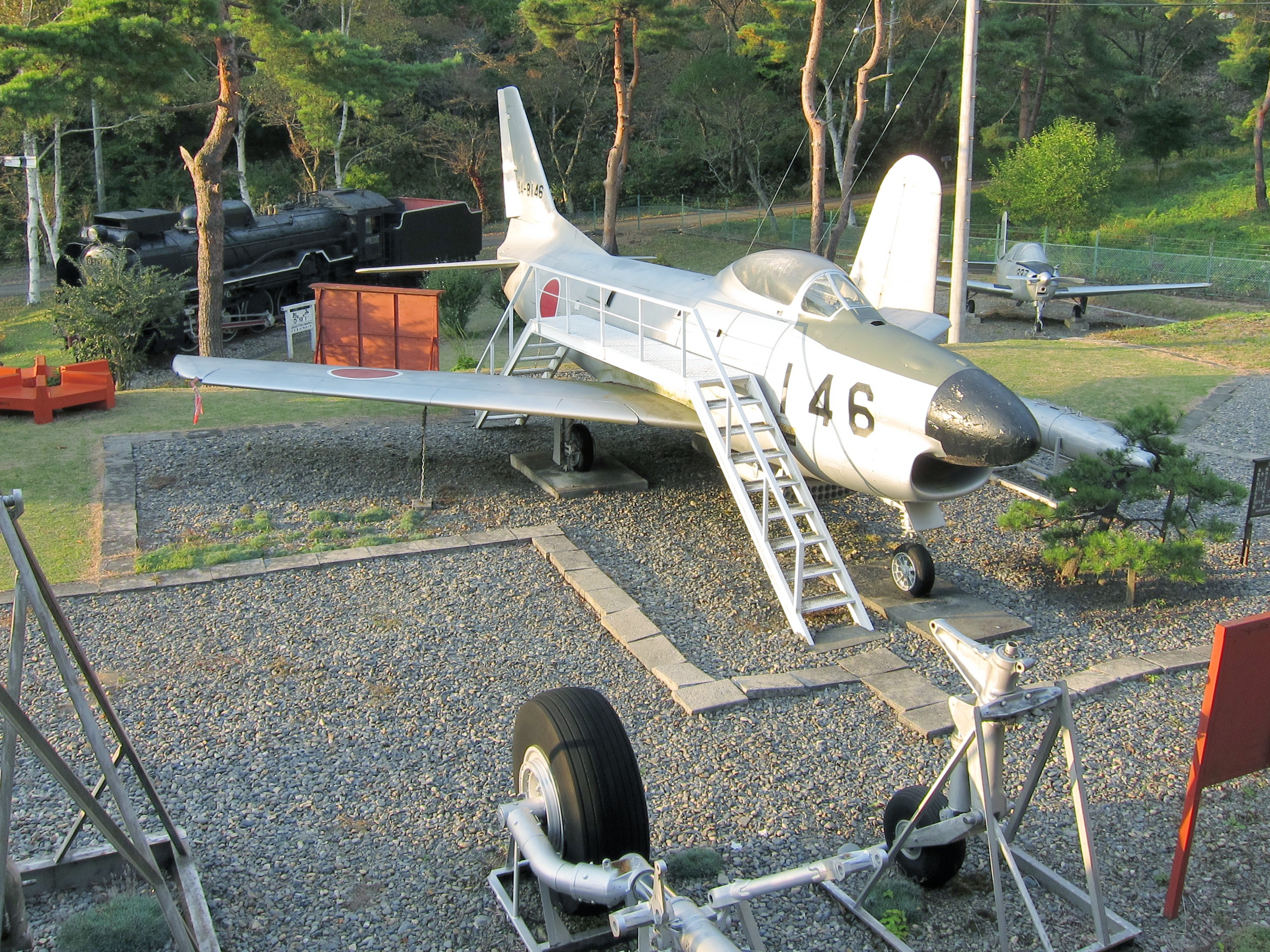
F-86D and T-34A and D51 on display at Hijiri Museum

Hijiri Aviation Museum (聖博物館, Hijiri hakubutsukan) is a local history museum located in Omi, Nagano. The museum was opened by the village of Omi on July 20, 1965, to contain displays of local natural history (birds, fish, insects, mineral samples and plants) and human history (Buddhist statues, historical documents and records pertaining to Omi Village). It was expanded on November 19, 1971, with the addition of an aviation pavilion and a number of outdoor static exhibits of former Japan Self-Defense Forces aircraft. The museum facilities were renovated in April 2012. The display also includes a JNR Class D51 steam locomotive manufactured in 1943 and a 41 cm/45 3rd Year Type naval gun salvaged from the wreckage of the Japanese battleship Mutsu.

== Aircraft on display ==
- North American F-86D Sabre 94-8146
- North American F-86F-40 Sabre 82-7865
- Beechcraft T-34A Mentor 51-0337
- Lockheed F-104J Starfighter 46-8608
- Curtiss C-46D Commando 91-1144 (nose section and some other parts only)
- Sikorsky H-19C Chickasaw 11-4716
