= Omberg =

Mountain in Sweden

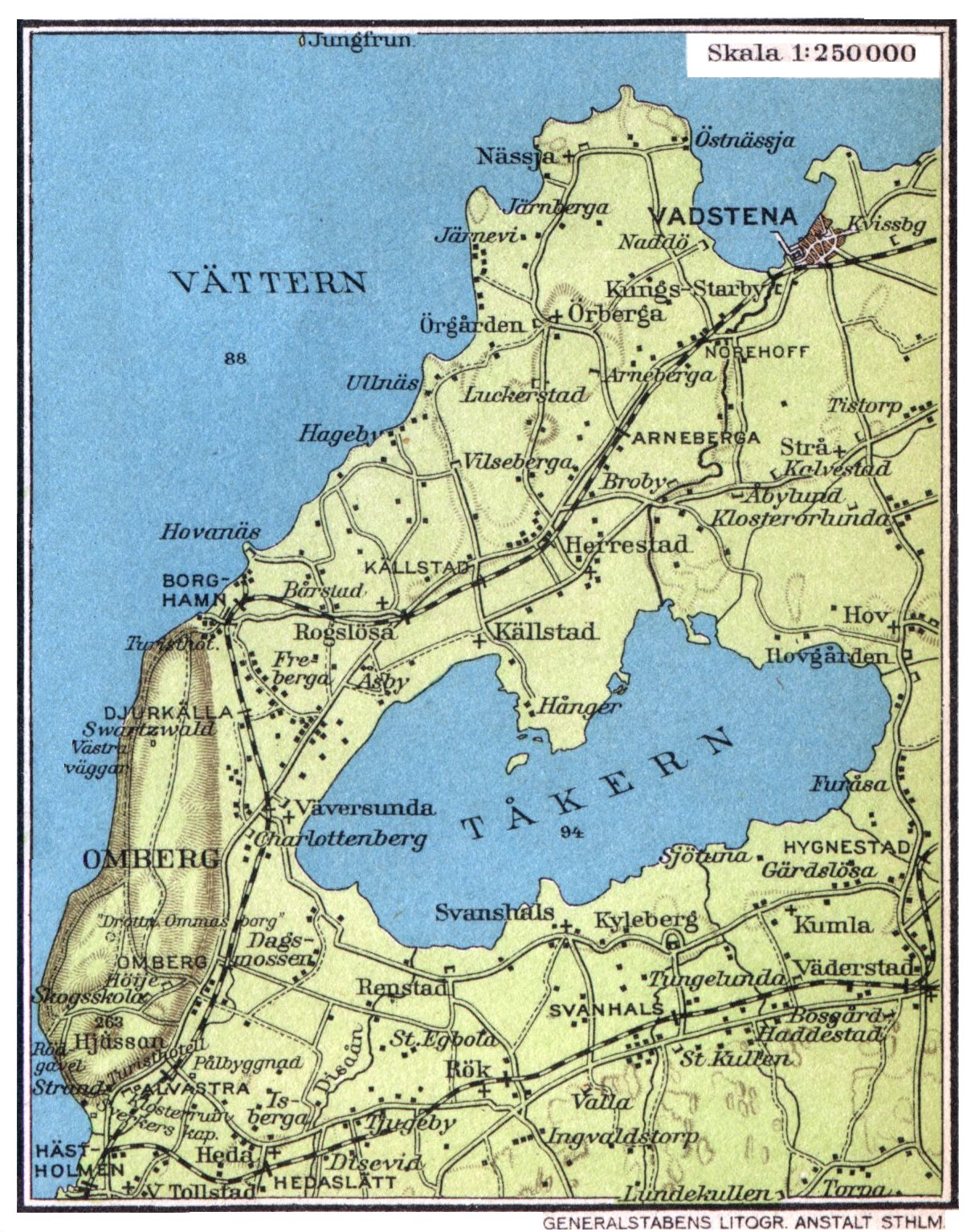
- 1928 map of the Omberg area.

Highest point
- Elevation: 262.8 m (862 ft)
- Coordinates: 58°18′01″N 14°38′51″E

Geography
- Location within Sweden
- Location: Sweden

Geology
- Rock age: Paleoproterozoic
- Mountain type: Granite horst

Omberg (Swedish pronunciation: [ˈɔ̌mːbærj]) is a forested mountain in western Östergötland County in Sweden. Administratively it is split between the municipalities of Ödeshög in the south and Vadstena in the north. It lies between Lake Vättern and Lake Tåkern. Alvastra Abbey lies at its foot.

Geologically Omberg is a horst, a fault-bounded and uplifted block of bedrock. The western cliff of Omberg has been indicated as an ättestupa in folk history.
