= Sakakita, Nagano =

Former village in Higashichikuma District, Japan

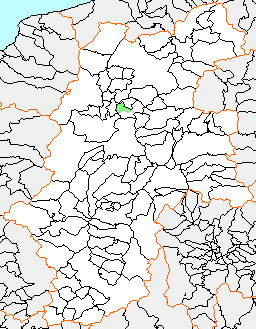
Map of Sakakita, Nagano

Sakakita (坂北村, Sakakita-mura) was a village located in Higashichikuma District, Nagano Prefecture, Japan.

== Population ==
As of 2003, the village had an estimated population of 2,139 and a density of 71.85 persons per km^{2}. The total area was 29.77 km^{2}.

== History ==
On October 11, 2005, Sakakita, along with the villages of Honjō and Sakai (all from Higashichikuma District), was merged to create the village of Chikuhoku.
