= Lapot =

Historical senicide practice

Lapot (Serbian: лапот, pronounced [lâpot]) is the legendary practice of senicide among the Timok Romanians of present-day Eastern Serbia: killing one's parents, or other elderly family members, once they become a financial burden on the family. According to T. R. Georgevitch (Đorđević), writing in 1918 about the eastern highlands of Serbia, in the region of Zaječar, the killing was carried out with an axe or stick, and the entire village was invited to attend. In some places corn mush was put on the head of the victim to make it seem as if the corn, not the family, was the killer.

Georgevitch suggests that this legend may have originated in tales surrounding the Roman occupation of local forts.

The Romans ... were very bellicose people. Their leader ordered all the holders of the fort up to forty years of age to be active fighters, from forty to fifty to be guards of the fort, and after fifty to be killed, because they have no military value. Since that period the old men were killed.

Anthropologist Senka Kovač, in a study on aging, mentions that the name "lapot" is given to this custom of killing the elderly in eastern Serbia.

In a study published in 1999, Bojan Jovanović argues that earlier anthropologists such as Trojanović, Georgevitch, and Čajkanović had confused myth with reality and that the well-known story of a grandson who had hidden his grandfather to protect him from lapot after a bad harvest, bringing him back to the village when the old man's wisdom had shown a way to survive, was the basis for establishing that the old should be respected for their knowledge and wise counsel.

The tradition was the topic of the 1972 TV docudrama Legenda o lapotu (The Legend of Lapot) by Goran Paskaljević, in which after a bad harvest, an elderly man who could no longer work was ritually slain. The 1992 novel Lapot by Živojin Pavlović received the NIN Prize. In 2004, Italian news agency ANSA reported from Belgrade that an attempt by the Serbian government to introduce a law restricting free dispensing of lifesaving medicines to the over 60s, had been described by the Serb media as a case of "lapot".

== See also ==
- Ubasute
- Euthanasia
- Senicide
- Ättestupa
