= Tåkern =

Lake in Östergötland, Sweden

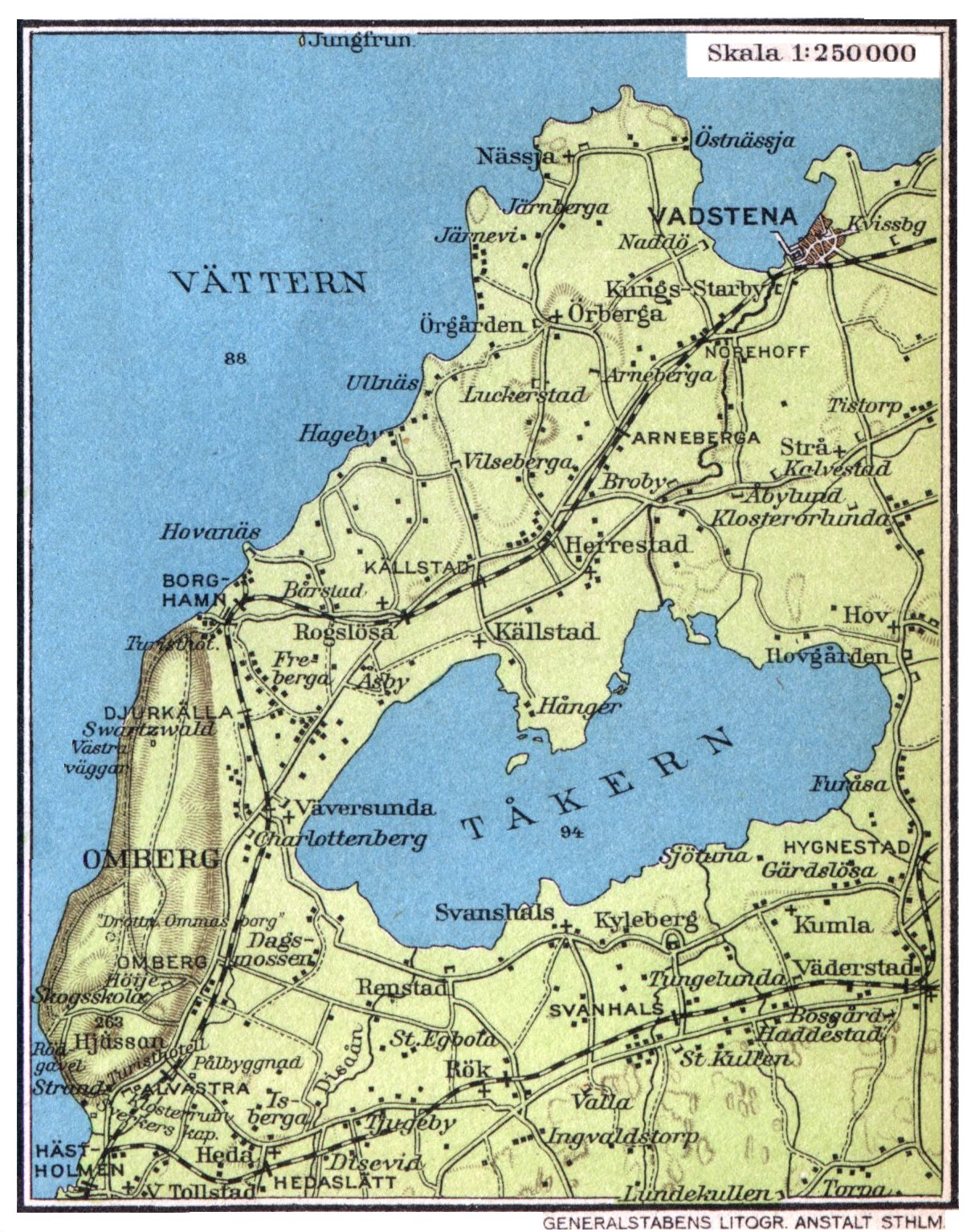
- Lake Tåkern on a map from 1928

- Location within Sweden
- Location: Östergötland County
- Coordinates: 58°21′N 14°48′E
- Basin countries: Sweden
- Max. length: 12 km (7.5 mi)
- Max. width: 8 km (5.0 mi)
- Average depth: 0.8 m (2.6 ft)

Ramsar Wetland
- Designated: 5 December 1974
- Reference no.: 23

Lake Tåkern (Swedish pronunciation: [ˈtǒːkɛɳ]) is a lake in Östergötland County, Sweden. It is considered one of northern Europe's foremost bird lakes. It is 12 km (7.5 mi) long and 8 km (5.0 mi) wide, with an average depth only 0.8 metres (2.6 feet). The lake lies around 20 km (12 mi) west of Mjölby, bordering in the west to Omberg. The whole lake, with the surrounding beaches, has been a nature reserve since 1975. From April to the end of July, it is not open to the public, except for visiting areas and walking routes.

The lake's history as a birdlake is related to the lake's water level lowering between 1842 and 1844. A number of bird species benefited from this. A change of the water level in the 1960s was made to prevent large differences in the water level.

Tåkern is in Ramsar Convention, an international convention for protection of valuable wetlands.

== See also ==
- Nearby lakes: Lake Vättern, Lake Vänern, Lake Boren, Lake Roxen.
- Nearby churches: Kumla Church, Östergötland
- Nearby sights: The Rök runestone, The Alvastra pile-dwelling
