= Ikusaka Dam =

Coordinates: 36°25′27″N 137°56′17″E

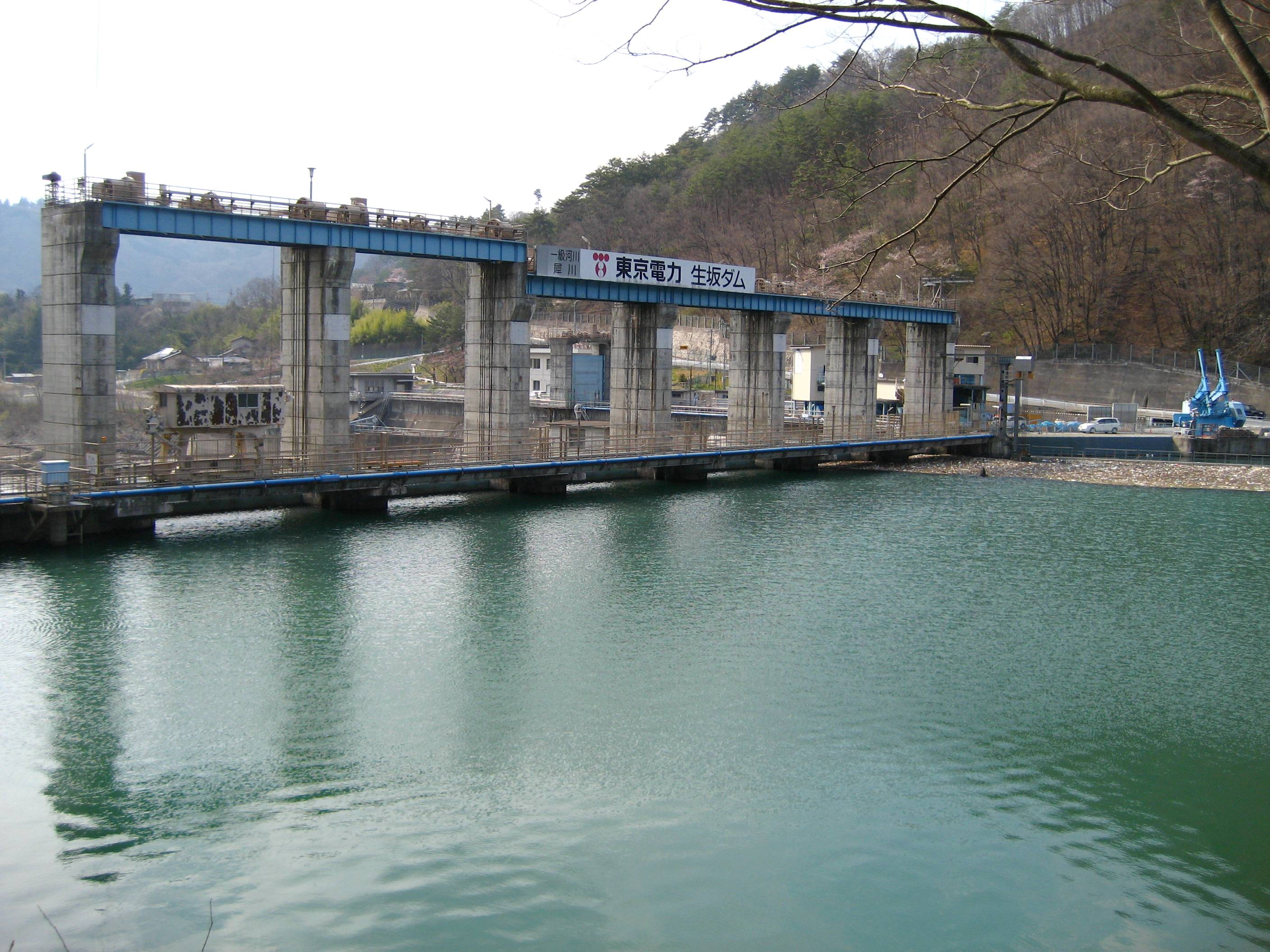
- Interactive map of Ikusaka Dam
- Location: Ikusaka, Nagano, Japan
- Construction began: 1961; 65 years ago
- Opening date: 1964; 62 years ago

Dam and spillways
- Height: 19.5 m (64 ft)
- Length: 108.4 m (356 ft)
- Dam volume: 23,000 m^{3} (810,000 cu ft)

Reservoir
- Total capacity: 3,110,000 m^{3} (110,000,000 cu ft)
- Catchment area: 2,263 km^{2} (874 sq mi)
- Surface area: 60 ha (150 acres)

Ikusaka Dam (生坂ダム, Ikusaka damu) is a dam in the village of Ikusaka, Nagano Prefecture, Japan, completed in 1964.

== Images ==
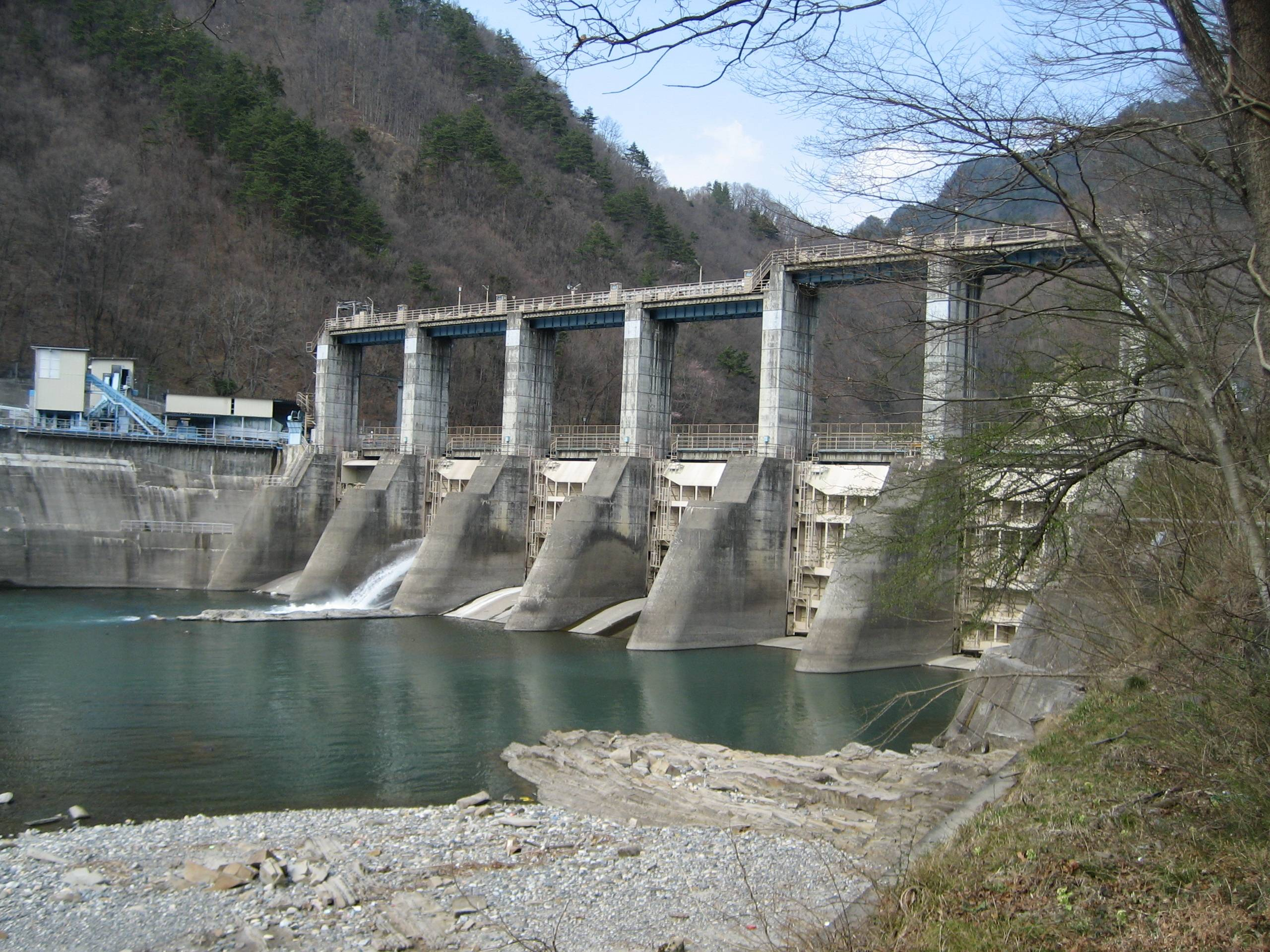
Ikusaka Dam

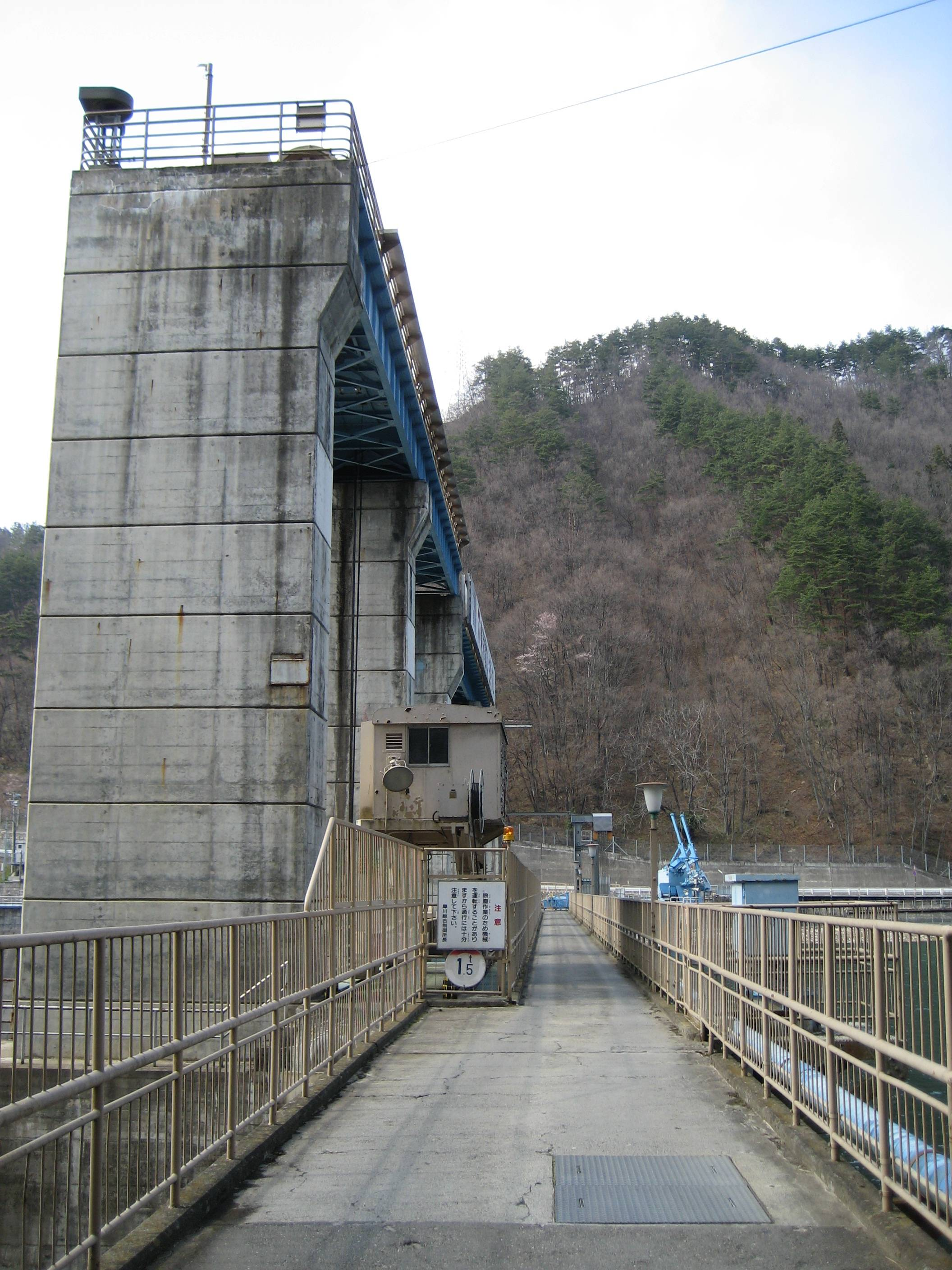
Ikusaka Dam road

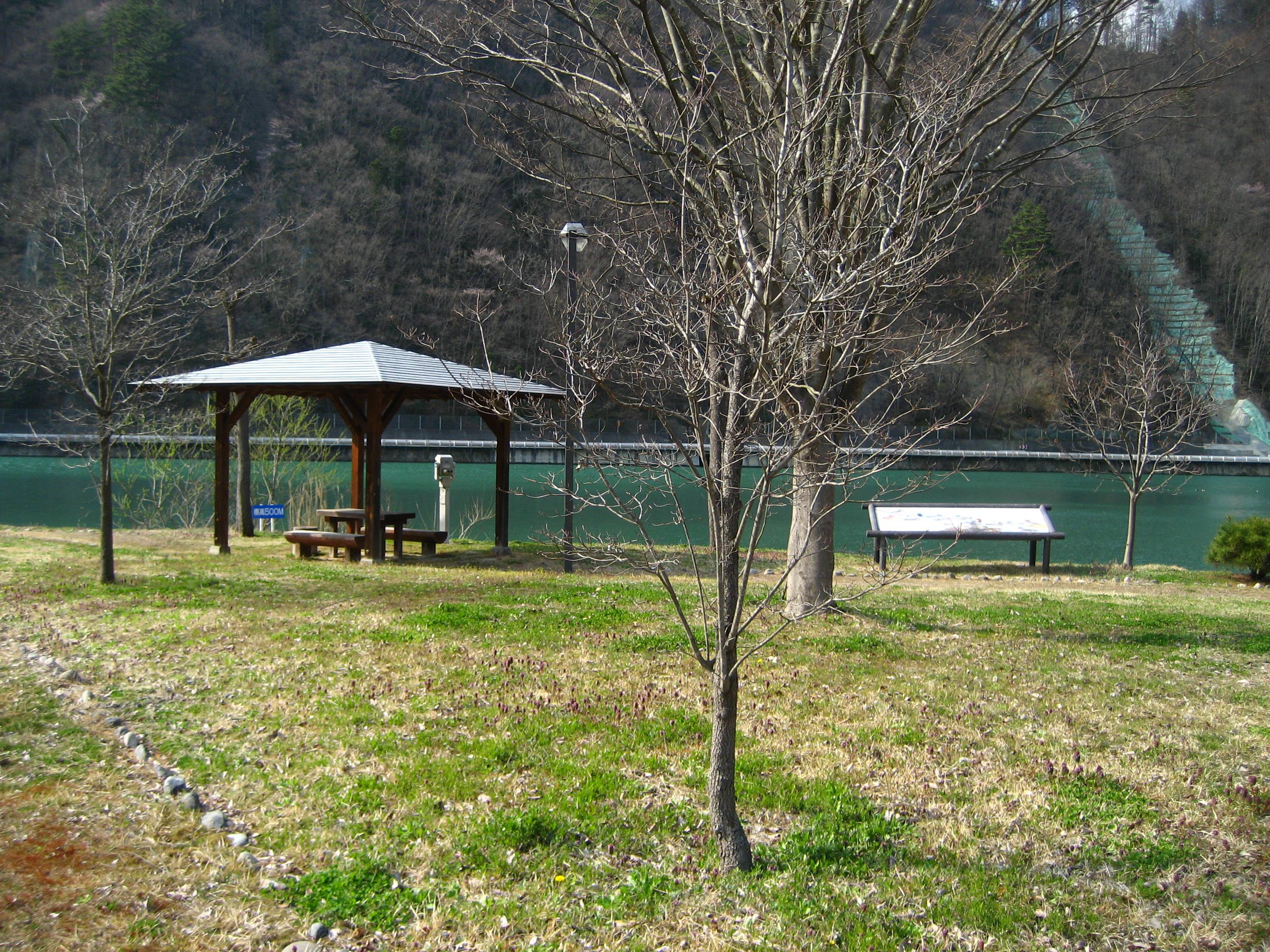
Mizutori park, next to the dam

== See also ==
- List of dams and reservoirs in Japan
