= Higashijo Dam =

Coordinates: 36°22′53″N 138°03′36″E

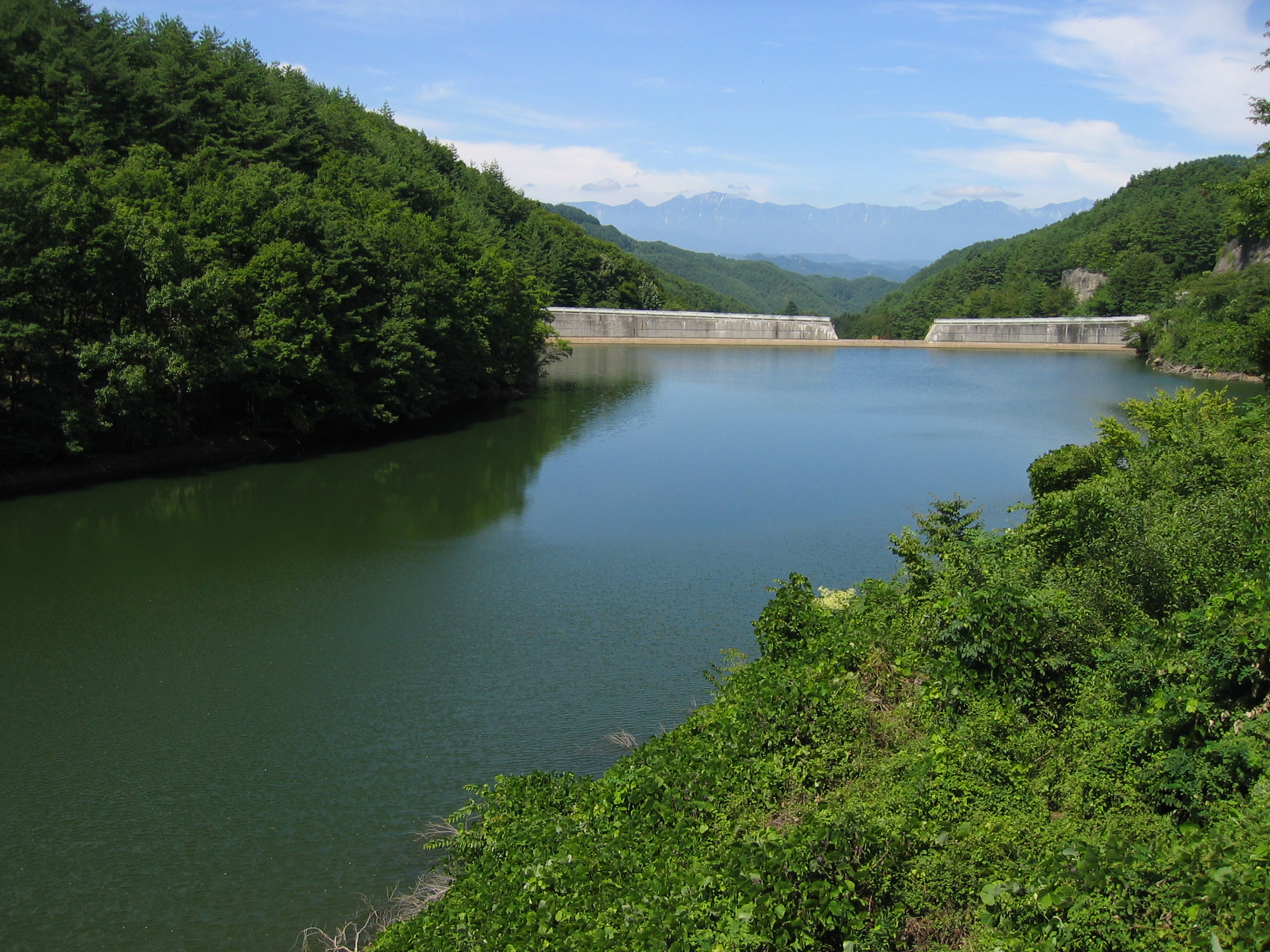
- Interactive map of Higashijo Dam
- Location: Chikuhoku, Nagano, Japan

Higashijo Dam (東条ダム, Higashijō damu) is a dam in Chikuhoku, Nagano Prefecture, Japan.
