= Sakai, Nagano =

Dissolved municipality in Nagano prefecture, Japan

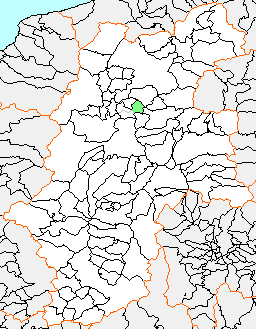
Map of Sakai, Nagano

Sakai (坂井村, Sakai-mura) was a village located in Higashichikuma District, Nagano Prefecture, Japan.

== Population ==
As of 2003, the village had an estimated population of 1,588 and a density of 42.45 persons per km^{2}. The total area was 37.41 km^{2}.

== History ==
On October 11, 2005, Sakai, along with the villages of Honjō and Sakakita (all from Higashichikuma District), were merged to create the village of Chikuhoku.
