= Honjō, Nagano =

Village in Nagano Prefecture, Japan

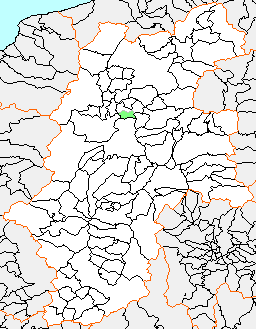
Map of Honjō, Nagano

Honjō (本城村, Honjō-mura) was a village located in Higashichikuma District, Nagano Prefecture, Japan.

As of 2003, the village had an estimated population of 2,148 and a density of 66.46 persons per km^{2}. The total area was 32.32 km^{2}.

On October 11, 2005, Honjō, along with the villages of Sakai and Sakakita (all from Higashichikuma District), was merged to create the village of Chikuhoku.
