= Ikusaka =

Village in Nagano Prefecture, Japan

Ikusaka 生坂村
- Village
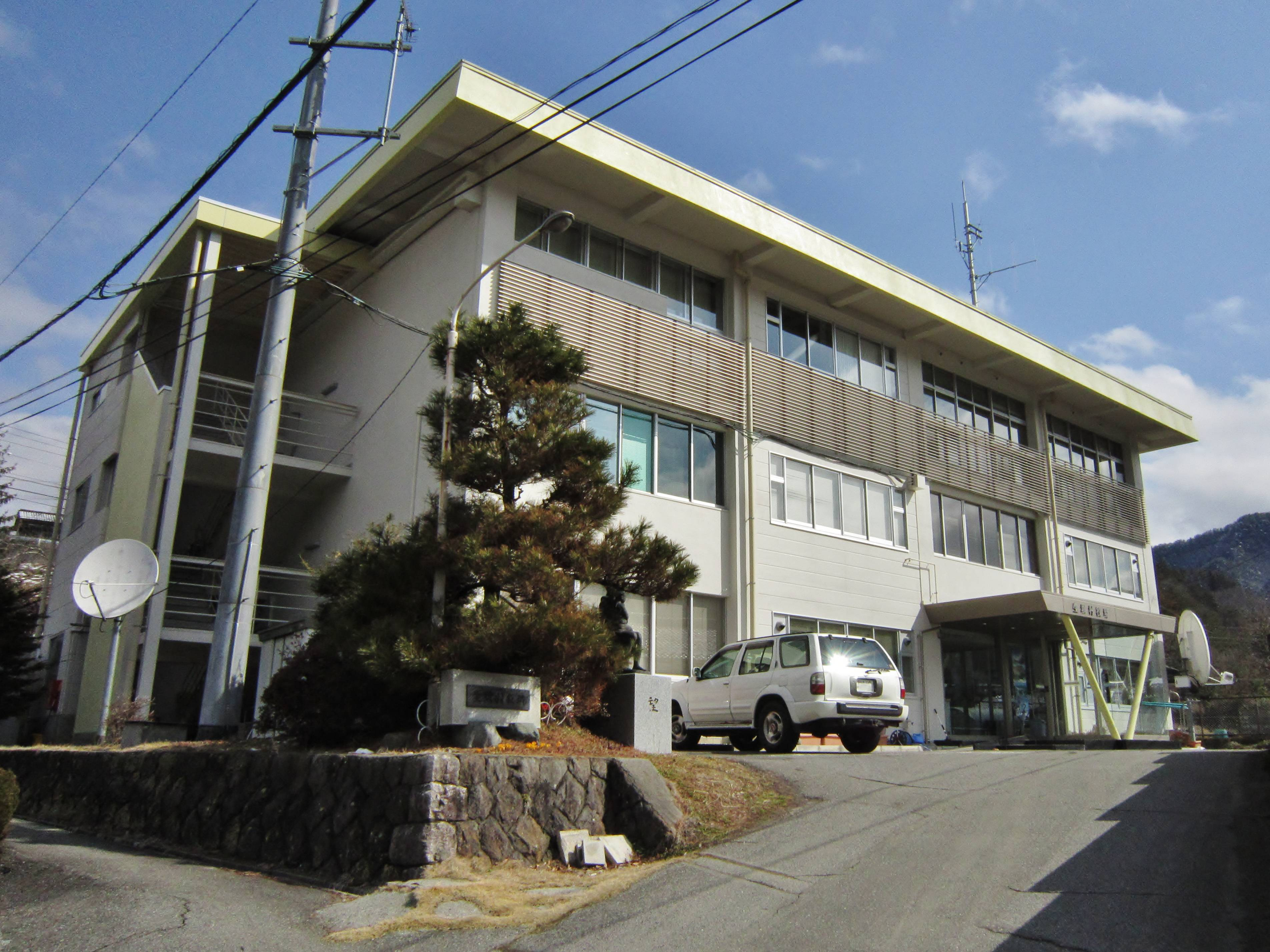
- Ikusaka Village Hall

- Flag Seal

- Location of Ikusaka in Nagano Prefecture

- Coordinates: 36°25′30.7″N 137°55′39.1″E
- Country: Japan
- Region: Chūbu (Kōshin'etsu)
- Prefecture: Nagano
- District: Higashichikuma

Area
  - Total: 39.05 km^{2} (15.08 sq mi)

Population (December 2019)
  - Total: 1,743
  - Density: 44.64/km^{2} (115.6/sq mi)
- Time zone: UTC+9 (Japan Standard Time)
- Symbols
  - Tree: Quercus dentata
  - Flower: Azalea
- Phone number: 0263-69-3111
- Address: 5493-2 Kami-ikusaka, Ikusaka-mura, Higashichikuma-gun, Nagano-ken 399-7201
- Website: Official website

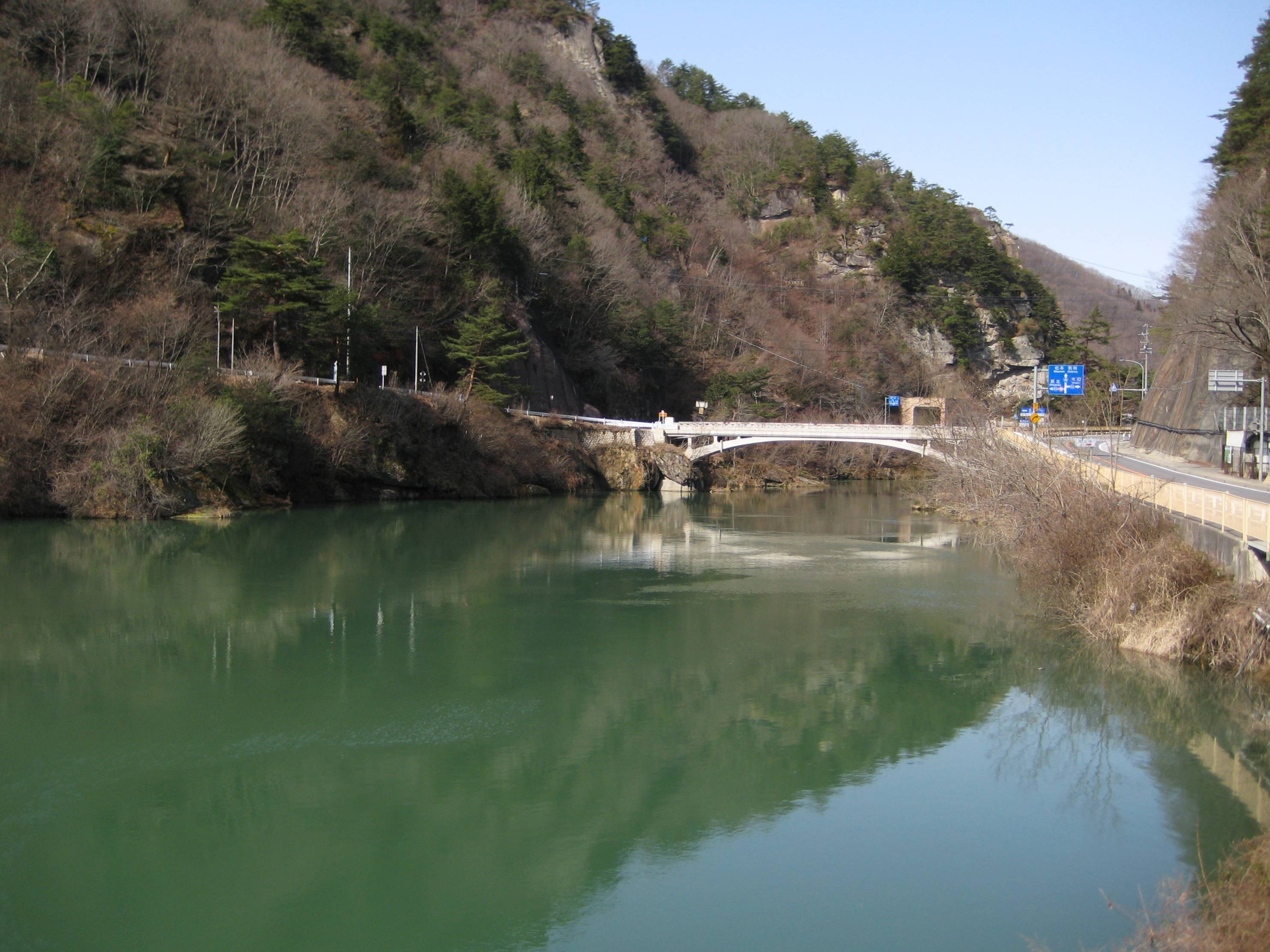
Sanseijibashi bridge

Ikusaka (生坂村, Ikusaka-mura) is a village located in Nagano Prefecture, Japan. As of 1 December 2019, the village has an estimated population of 1,743 in 721 households, and a population density of 44.6 persons per km^{2}. The total area of the village is 39.05 square kilometres (15.08 sq mi).

== Geography ==
Ikusaka is located in the center of Nagano Prefecture. The Ikusaka Dam and Taira Dam are located in the village.

=== Surrounding municipalities ===
- Nagano Prefecture
  - Azumino
  - Chikuhoku
  - Ikeda
  - Nagano
  - Ōmachi

=== Climate ===
The village has a climate characterized by hot and humid summers, and cold winters (Köppen climate classification Cfa. The average annual temperature in Ikusaka is 11.5 °C. The average annual rainfall is 1148 mm with September as the wettest month. The temperatures are highest on average in August, at around 24.8 °C, and lowest in January, at around -1.1 °C.

== Demographics ==
Per Japanese census data, the population of Ikusaka has decreased by about two-thirds over the past 60 years.

Historical population
Year	Pop.	±%
1960	4,855	—
1970	3,684	−24.1%
1980	3,142	−14.7%
1990	2,738	−12.9%
2000	2,416	−11.8%
2010	1,953	−19.2%
2020	1,639	−16.1%

== History ==
The area of present-day Ikusaka was part of ancient Shinano Province. The area was part of the holdings of Matsumoto Domain during the Edo period. The village of Ikusaka was established on April 1, 1889, by the establishment of the modern municipalities system.

== Economy ==
The economy of the village is based on agriculture, with tobacco as the primary crop.

== Education ==
Ikusaka has one public elementary school and one public middle school operated by the village government. The village does not have a high school.

== Transportation ==
=== Railway ===
The village does not have any passenger railway service.

=== Highway ===
- National Route 19
