= Senicide =

Killing of the elderly actively or passively by themselves

Senicide, also known as geronticide or gerontocide, is the practice of killing the elderly. This killing of the elderly can be characterized by both active and passive methods as senio-euthanasia or altruistic self-sacrifice. The aim of active senio-euthanasia is to relieve the clan, family, or society from the burden of an old person. But an old person might kill themself (autothanasia) altruistically. In case of the altruistic self-sacrifice, the aim is to fulfill an old tradition or to stop being a burden to the clan. Both are understood as a sacrificial death.

Senicide is found in various cultures all over the world and has been practiced during different time periods. The methods of senicide are rooted in the traditions and customs of a given society.

== Terminology ==
The word senicide "is less well known, though of older provenance" than geronticide. It is "so rare a word that Microsoft Word’s spellcheck underlines it in red, itching to autocorrect it to suicide", according to historian Niall Ferguson. In an article for The Fortnightly Review, African explorer Harry Johnston first used the term "senicide" in 1889. He reported that in ancient Sardinia, the Sardi considered it a sacred duty to kill their elderly relatives with a club or by forcing them to jump from a high cliff.

Various authors use the terms "gerontocide" and "geronticide" interchangeably. Maxwell might have used geronticide for the first time in 1983. Today we find both terms in common usage; "senicide", referring to the cultural and ritual killing of the old aged; and "geronticide", referring to the murder or manslaughter of any senior person.

== Senicide in ethnography and history ==
Since there is little evidence of these killings, such as court records or very rare eyewitness accounts, it has been suggested that most of these reports are myths about practices of foreign peoples or past times. Schulte criticized in a review of sources on native North America the quality of the data, the role of hearsay and uncredited copying of information. "This is particularly unfortunate as there is indeed some positive evidence for a practice of gerontocide, which could serve as a basis for serious studies" (2001, p. 25). However, senicide can be easily detected in the custom of thalaikoothal to this day in India.

The low value and image of old age is the source of all ageism, which may lead especially in very old age and times of great need to senicide. According to author Michael Brogden, most "societies kill the elderly“ under certain conditions, or more precisely: "it is the social group that kills". Brogden also noted that very often in close family groups, it is the son, after an intensive discussion among the elders, who carries out the killing.

Pousset found in an overview of some ethnological studies or collections (Koty, 1934; Simmons, 1945; Glascock, 1982; Maxwell/Silverman, 1989; Südkamp; Beauvoir, 1996) that 162 ethnic groups worldwide practiced senicide (2023).

It has been claimed that only in a "few idyllic pastures for older people" was there no senicide, not even reflected in legends, folk and fairy tales (see the collection of Dee L. Ashliman) or in ethnographic studies (Brogden/ Nijhar, 2000). There is no pervasive or extensively confirmed senicide among the Hungarians, Finns, Jews, Egyptians, and Persians. Simone de Beauvoir names other ethnic groups like the Kuna, Inca and Balinese, who have a strong cultural tradition of respect for their older citizens and no extensive tradition of senicide. There are other groups in which older citizens lose prestige, but these groups do not practice senicide. These include Arando, Choroti, Jivaro, Lele, Lepcha, Mataco, Miao, Mende and Zande (Beauvoir, 1996). Concerning some ethnic groups like the Aleuts, more research is needed as different results are found whether they do practice senicide.

== Forms of senicide ==
In senio-euthanasia or involuntary euthanasia, the old person is actively killed by strangulation, drowning, stabbing, by a club, shooting, submersion in an oil-bath, being pushed or forced to jump from a cliff, hypo- or hypermedication, and other methods. Senio-euthanasia might also occur passively by omission and termination of treatment as well as neglect by abandonment until death. In some cases, senicide progresses slowly through a long period of social death. This situation in today’s old age homes is frequently referred to as “granny dumping”. An old person may altruistically use either an active or passive method to end his life like throwing under a train or poisoning, or he dies a silent-passive death by laying down in the savannah or a cavern e.g. - dying a psychogenic death. The old person may also voluntarily refuse all food and fluids (VRFF) - also voluntarily stop eating and drinking (VSED). This ends in terminal dehydration. Émile Durkheim described the type of psychogenic death as fatalistic suicide. VRFF was already known by the Greeks and Romans in antiquity as a highly distinctive method to end life, the autothanasia. The Greeks called the method of stopping voluntarily all food and fluids kartería (endurance), the Romans inedia (no food), (Hooff, 1990).

== Motivation for senicide ==
The social motivations for senicide are disputed. Motivations arising during times of environmental difficulties and war. For reasons of conflict are somewhat understandable. However, there are ethnic groups who practice senicide primarily from socio-tradition. External factors are not the primary motivations. These societies emphasize socio-cultural explanations that give an added value or unique perspective to the death of an elder person. They see the elderly person’s death as voluntary and their deaths as valiant and commendable under the circumstances. All cases arise from material necessity. Modern forms of senicide are senio-euthanasia via neglect, stopping various life-supporting devices, and under- or overmedication in family or old age homes are more clandestine. The form of altruistic VRFF as extinction is known as the “silent scandal” (Pousset 2023, p. 2)

== Risk and protection factors ==
Modern societies are questioning the value of the old. Risk factors for the older generations include low income, food insecurity, religious indifference, greediness of potential heirs, and hostility. Factors protecting older citizens include a protective family environment, personal wealth, empathetic family concern, and social respectability. Personal wealth is ambivalent in nature, it can be both a protective factor and a risk factor. Also, in many Asian or African cultures - known for their traditional honoring of old age - individuals must face the collapse of any respect in some outstanding cases. In Kenya there are reports from “greedy” children who hunt or kill their parents or grandparents by accusing them of witchcraft. “Each year, more than 400 older people are killed in Kenya’s coastal region, with over 1,000 facing death threats” according to the founder of an old age rescue centre near Malindi. In this region, threatened elders seek shelter and protection. This form of senicide or active senio-euthanasie can be considered as gerontocide or bluntly murder.

== COVID-19 and senicide ==
The COVID-19 pandemic brought to light attitudes of ageism in policy and private life which neglected the value and vulnerability of the elderly heavily or completely. Senicide related to the pandemic was counted as "the word of the hour" by Niall Ferguson. Usually pandemics hit children first, but the coronavirus primarily targeted the elderly. Niall Ferguson argued hopefully in 2020: "Senicide will never be tolerated in the 2020s, least of all in modern, developed democracies".

== By culture ==
=== India ===
In the southern Indian state of Tamil Nadu, the illegal practice of senicide – known locally as thalaikoothal – is said to occur dozens or perhaps hundreds of times each year. The practice is illegal in India.

=== Inuit ===
In earlier times Inuit would leave their elderly on the ice to die but it was rare, except during famines. The last known case of Inuit senicide was in 1939.

=== Chukchi ===
Ethnographic accounts describe a historical practice of voluntary death among the Chukchi of northeastern Siberia, in which elderly or terminally ill individuals could request death at the hands of close relatives. Anthropologist Rane Willerslev has argued that the practice was culturally understood as a form of ritual sacrifice rather than ordinary suicide.

=== Native Americans ===
Some encyclopedic sources have reported that certain nomadic groups, including the Shoshone and Ahtna, abandoned elderly individuals during periods of migration or resource scarcity. Modern scholarship, however, generally interprets these accounts as survival-driven abandonment rather than institutionalized senicide.

Some sources have reported that among the Aché of Paraguay, elderly individuals, particularly women, were sometimes killed in situations of extreme resource scarcity or mobility stress.

=== Japan ===
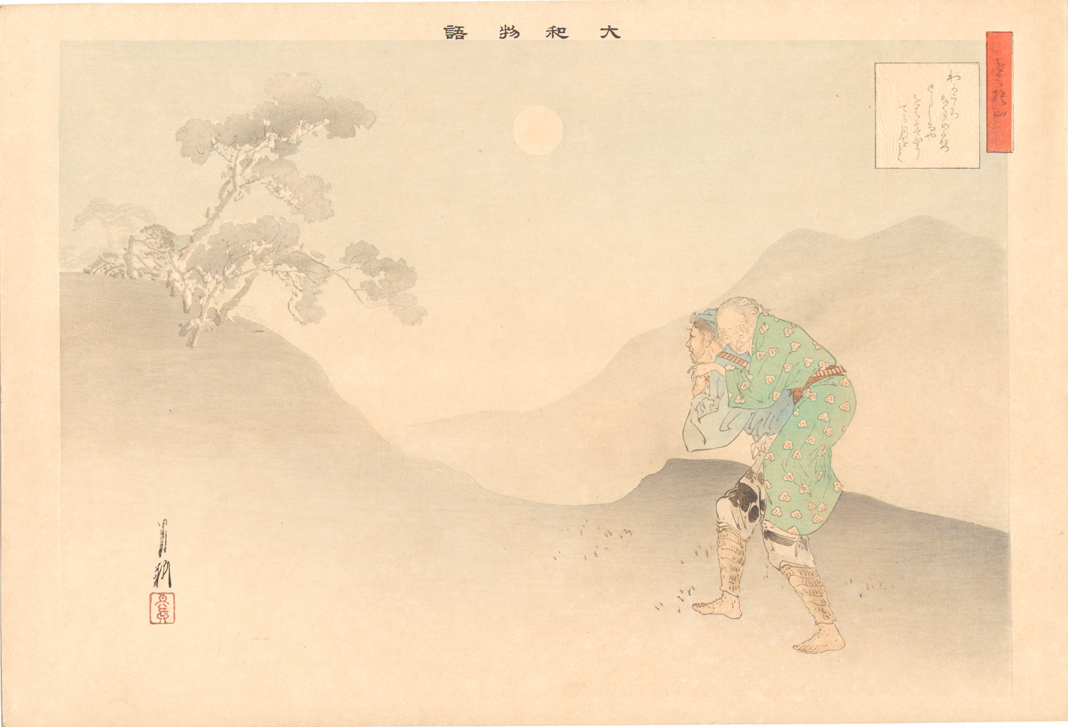
Scene depicting the legend of ubasute, in which an elderly woman is abandoned on a mountain in Sarashina, Japan

According to legends a practice called Ubasute (姥捨, 'abandoning an old woman') was performed in Japan in the distant past, whereby an infirm or elderly relative was carried to a mountain, or some other remote, desolate place, and left there to die. However there is no evidence that this has ever been a common custom.

=== Korea ===
According to Korean folklore, a practice called "Goryeojang" or "Goryeo burial" was performed in Korea in the distant past. whereby an infirm or elderly female relative was left to death by starvation. The term "Goryeo" places the practice in the Goryeo dynasty (the far past). The folklore element has been traced to Chinese and Japanese stories rather than Korean origin, but it was also associated with the existence of grave goods in common Goryeo-era stone tombs, with the characteristic small rice pot found by "pot hunters" as evidence of that practice.

=== Sweden ===
In Swedish folklore, the ättestupa is a cliff where elderly people were said to leap, or be thrown, to death. While the trope has survived as an urban legend, and a metaphor for deficient welfare for the elderly, a researcher argues that the practice never existed.

=== Serbia ===
Lapot is a mythical Serbian practice of disposing of one's parents.

=== Ancient Rome and Greece ===
Parkin provides eighteen cases of senicide which the people of antiquity believed happened. Of these cases, only two of them occurred in Greek society; another took place in Roman society, while the rest happened in other cultures. One example that Parkin provides is of the island of Keos in the Aegean Sea. Although many different variations of the Keian story exist, the legendary practice may have begun when the Athenians besieged the island. In an attempt to preserve the food supply, the Keians voted for all people over 60 years of age to die by suicide by drinking hemlock. The other case of Roman senicide occurred on the island of Sardinia, where human sacrifices of 70-years-old fathers were made by their sons to the titan Cronus.

== See also ==
- Ageism
- Altruistic suicide
- Assisted suicide
- Involuntary euthanasia
- Granny dumping
- Matricide
- Patricide
