= Onikuma Dam =

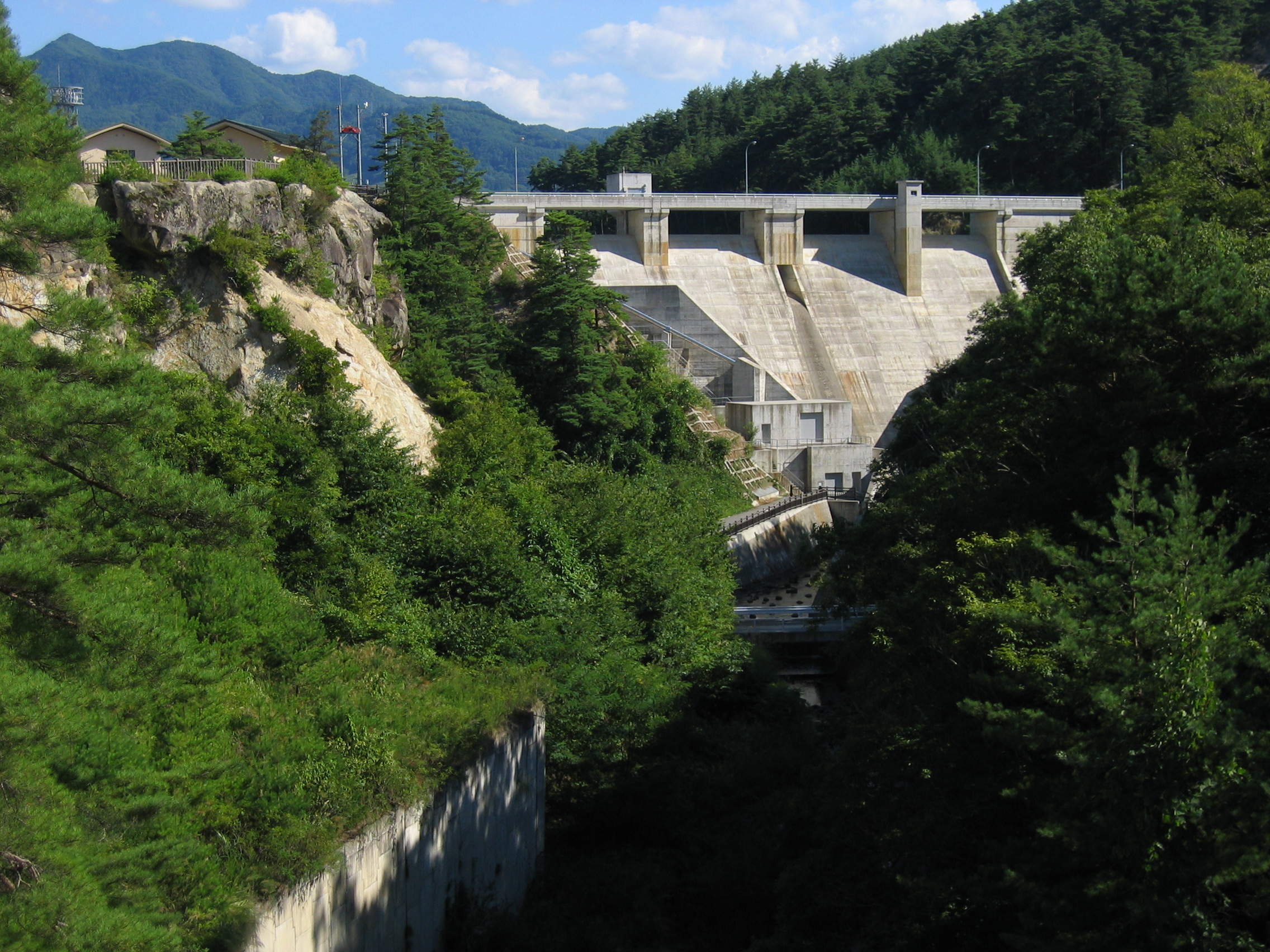
- Interactive map of Onikuma Dam
- Location: Nagano Prefecture, Japan
- Coordinates: 36°25′08″N 137°59′59″E

Onikuma Dam (Japanese: 小仁熊ダム) is a dam in the Nagano Prefecture, Japan, completed in 2003.
