= Kumla Church, Östergötland =

Church building in Mjölby Municipality, Sweden

Coordinates: 58°19′48″N 14°52′56″E

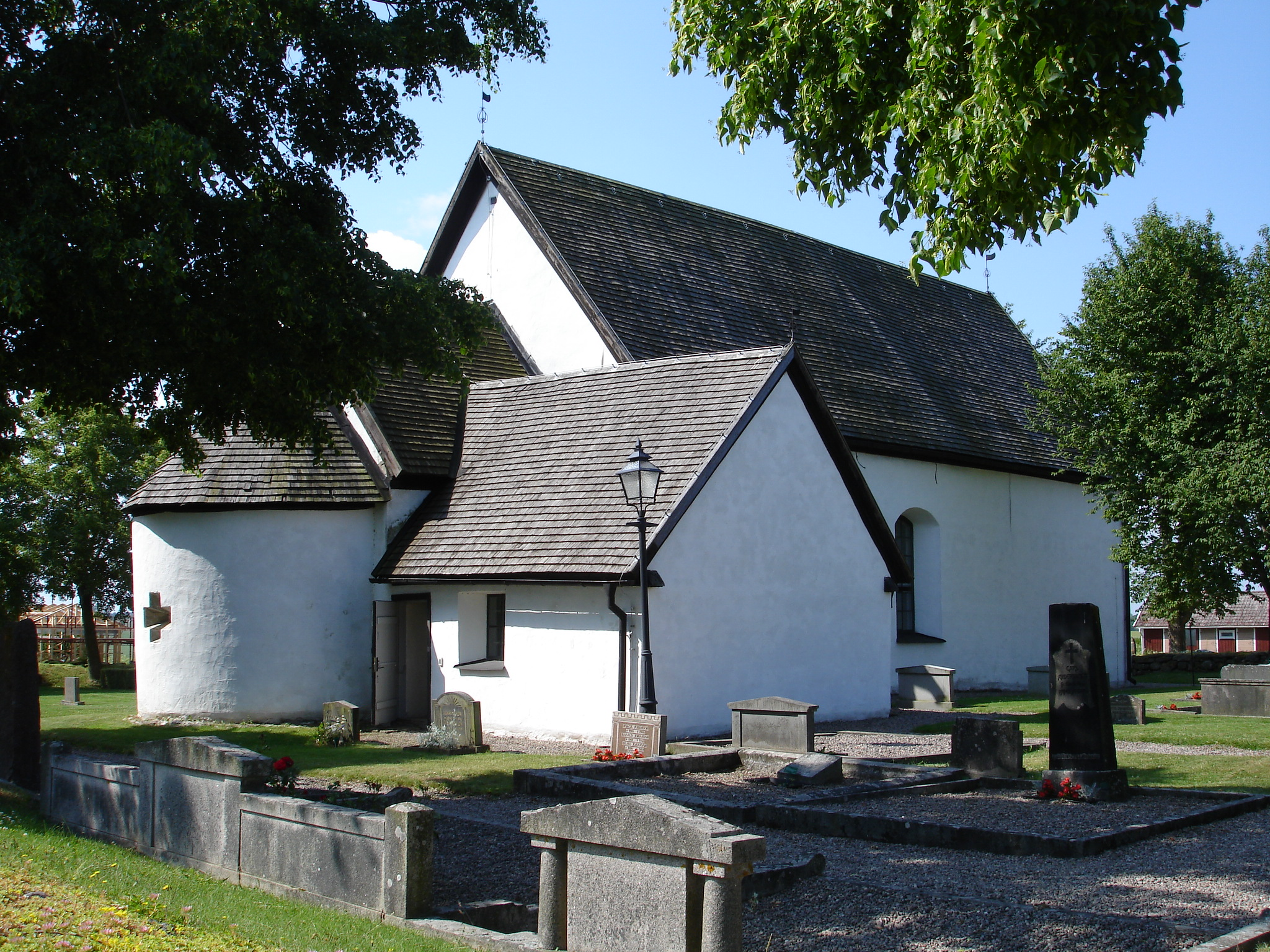

Kumla Church (Swedish: Kumla kyrka) is a limestone church, built in the 12th century. It is located at the lake Tåkern in Kumla socken in Mjölby Municipality in Östergötland, Sweden.
