= Taira Dam =

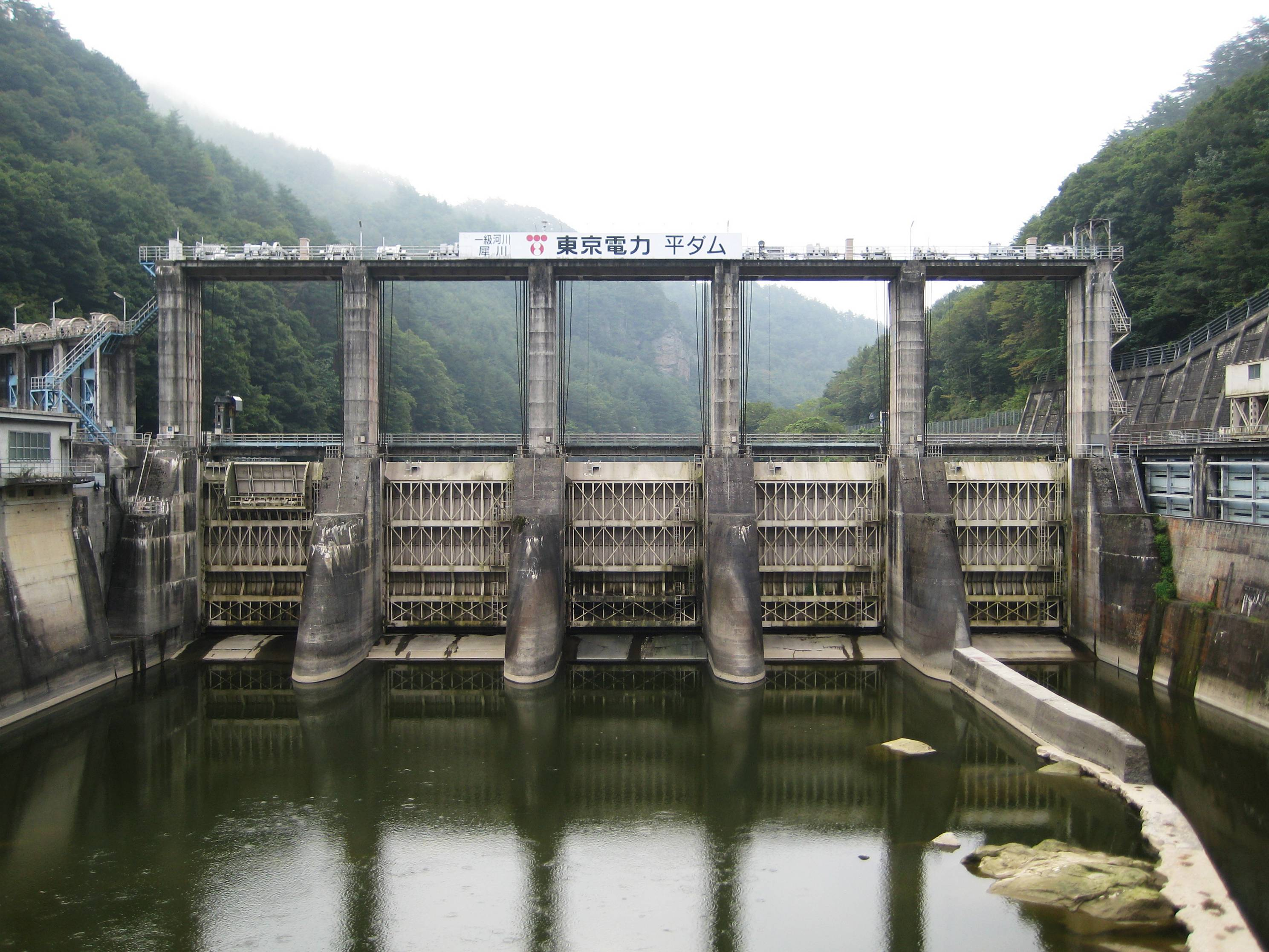
- Interactive map of Taira Dam
- Location: Nagano Prefecture, Japan
- Coordinates: 36°28′41″N 137°57′13″E
- Owner: TEPCO Renewable Power

Dam and spillways
- Type of dam: Gravity concrete dam
- Height: 19.5 m (64 ft)
- Length: 87.8 m (288 ft)
- Dam volume: 17,000m^{2}

Power Station
- Installed capacity: 15.6 MW

Taira Dam (Japanese: 平ダム) is a dam in the Nagano Prefecture, Japan, completed in 1957. It is a gravity-type concrete dam with a height of 19.5 meters and is owned by TEPCO Renewable Power. It can generate up to 15,600 kilowatts of electricity.
