= Ättestupa =

Supposed sites of senicide in Sweden

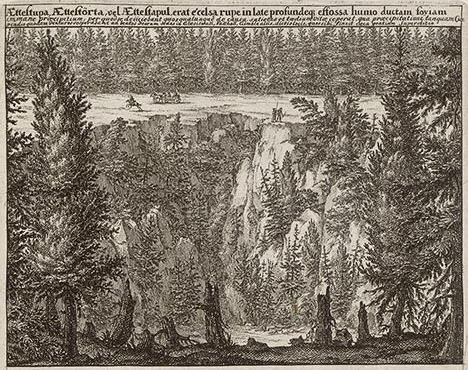
Ättestupa in Västergötland as depicted by Willem Swidde in Erik Dahlbergh, Suecia antiqua et hodierna (1705)

Ättestupa (Swedish for 'kin/clan precipice') is a name given to a number of precipices in Sweden.

The name supposedly denotes sites where ritual senicide took place during pagan Norse prehistoric times, whereby elderly people threw themselves, or were thrown, to their deaths. According to legend, this was done when old people were unable to support themselves or assist in a household.

== History of the term ==
Senicide and suicide precipices are mentioned in several sources from antiquity, such as the Ligurians in Paradoxographus Vaticanus and Procopius in his description of the Heruli from the 6th century CE. Solinus wrote about the Hyperboreans at the North Pole, where it is daylight for half a year—between the vernal equinox to the autumnal equinox, and described the climate as being so healthy that the people there did not die, but instead, threw themselves from a precipice into the sea.

The term ättestupa came into use in Sweden in the 17th century, inspired by the Old Icelandic saga Gautreks saga, which is partly set in the Swedish region of Götaland. The saga contains a comical episode known as Dalafíflaþáttr ('the story of the fools from the valleys') in which one particular family is so miserly that they prefer to kill themselves than see their wealth spent on hospitality. In this tale, the family members kill themselves by jumping off a cliff which the saga calls the Ættarstapi or Ætternisstapi ("dynasty precipice"), a word which occurs in no Old Norse texts other than this saga. Gautreks saga became known in Sweden in 1664, when an edition and Swedish translation was published by Olaus Verelius.

This seems to have inspired Swedish antiquarians from the 17th century through into the 19th to label various cliffs with the name ättestupa. The Swedish linguist Adolf Noreen started questioning the myth at the end of the 19th century, and it is now generally accepted among researchers that the practice of suicide precipices never existed. Place-names which Gautreks saga inspired, however, continue to exist in the Swedish landscape.

The term ättestupa has been used often in modern times, in political contexts, to underline how bad an insufficiently funded social security program can be, especially for retirees.

== Associated locations ==
Several places in Sweden are alleged to be former suicide precipices:

- Keillers Park in Gothenburg has a precipice called Ättestupan.
- A part of the village Åby outside of Norrköping was called Ättetorp, and in the nearby forest there is a precipice called Ättestupan.
- Precipices at Vargön and close to the lake Vristulven in Västergötland
- Ättestupeberget at Långared (Alingsås kommun, Västergötland) (RT 90: X=6431606, Y=1297860)
- Ättestupan in Västra Tunhem (Vänersborgs kommun, Västergötland) (RT 90: X=6474997, Y=1301199)
- Kullberget in Hällefors (Örebro län) is locally called "ättestupan".
- Olofströms kommun between Olofström – Gaslunda, by the lake Orlunden
- The western cliff faces of Omberg in Östergötland are said to be an ättestupa.
- Virsehatt nature reserve in Halland is said to be an ättestupa.

== In popular culture ==
In the 1960s, the Swedish comedy radio program Mosebacke Monarki satirically introduced ättestupa, abbreviated ÄTP, as an alternative to ATP, a state-provided pension.

In the 2019 folk horror film Midsommar, the protagonists witness an ättestupa ceremony the day after they arrive at their Swedish friend's ancestral commune for a midsummer festival.

In season 2, episode 8 of the CBS remake of Ghosts titled "The Liquor License", the Viking ghost character Thorfin reveals he practiced ättestupa during a conversation. The episode first aired On 9 December 2022.

Season 1, episode 1 of the Netflix show Norsemen titled "The Homecoming" includes an extended scene with a group of old men from Norheim being encouraged to complete an ättestupa ceremony by a slave. After the first man jumps to his death, the rest are not persuaded enough to follow. The slave, who says he cannot really force them to do anything they do not want to, negotiates with them to instead stay away from Norheim so the rest do not find out they refused to jump.

== See also ==
- Ubasute
- Euthanasia
- Thalaikoothal
