= Granny dumping =

Abandoning elderly people in a care facility

Granny dumping is "the abandonment of an elderly person in a public place such as a hospital or nursing home, especially by a relative". The term was introduced in the early 1980s by professionals in the medical and social work fields. It may be carried out by family members who are unable or unwilling to continue providing care due to financial problems, burnout, lack of resources (such as home health or assisted living options), or stress. However, instances of institutional granny dumping, by hospitals and care facilities, has also been known to occur.

The "dumping" may involve the literal abandonment of an elderly person, who is taken to a location such as hospital waiting area or emergency room and then left, or in the refusal to return to collect an elderly person after the person is discharged from a hospital visit or hotel stay. While leaving an elderly person in a hospital or nursing facility is a common form of the practice, there have been incidences of elderly people being "dumped" in other locations, such as the side of a public street.

== Historical background, causes, and costs ==
A practice known as ubasute, existed in Japanese mythology since centuries ago, involving legends of senile elders who were brought to mountaintops by poor citizens who were unable to look after them. The widespread economic and demographic problems facing Japan have seen it on the rise, with relatives dropping off seniors at hospitals or charities. 70,000 (both male and female equally) elderly Americans were estimated to have been abandoned in 1992 in a report issued by the American College of Emergency Physicians.

In this same study, ACEP received informal surveys from 169 hospital Emergency Departments and report an average of 8 "granny dumping" abandonments per week. According to The New York Times, 1 in 5 people are now caring for an elderly parent and many people are spending more time caring for an elderly parent than their own children. Social workers have said that this may be the result of millions of people who are near the breaking point of looking after their elderly parents who are in poor health.

In the US, granny dumping is more likely to happen in states such as Florida, Texas, and California where there are large populations of retirement communities. Congress has attempted to step in by mandating to emergency departments requiring them to see all patients. In some US states, and some other countries, the practice is illegal, or is subject to efforts to declare it illegal.

However, since 1989, Medicaid has covered fewer and fewer medical bills through reimbursement (in 1989, it was 78% but that number is decreasing) and reduced eligibility. In some cases, the hospitals may not want to take the risk of having a patient who cannot pay so they will attempt to transfer their care to another hospital. According to the Consolidated Omnibus Budget Reconciliation Act of 1985 set into place by Ronald Reagan, a hospital can transfer at the patient's request or providers must sign a document providing why they believe a patient's care should be better served at another facility. With 40% of revenue coming from Medicaid and Medicare a hospital must earn 8 cents per dollar to compensate for the loss of 7 cents per Medicaid/Medicare patients. Hospitals had to pay an additional 2 billion dollars to private payers to cover costs for Medicare/Medicaid patients in 1989.

== By caregivers ==
In cases where granny dumping is practiced by family members or caregivers, the dumping falls into two categories: temporary, or permanent. Temporary abandonment of elderly persons is generally due to the inability or expense of finding temporary care for a person with complex medical needs. Needing a break, or wishing to go on a holiday, the normal caregivers will take their elderly patient to a hospital emergency room, or possibly a hotel, and then leave, with the plan to return once the vacation is over.

Incidents of granny dumping often happen before long weekends and may peak before Christmas when families head off on holidays. Caregivers in both Australia and New Zealand report that old people without acute medical problems are dropped off at hospitals. As a result, hospitals and care facilities have to carry an extra burden on their limited resources.

== Institutional ==
A hospital or care facility's legal obligation in such cases can be complicated. The protocols to handle a permanently abandoned elderly person are unclear and vary between institutions. However, the expense of providing emergency or long-term care to an abandoned elderly person can represent a considerable burden on a facility's budget, capacity, and manpower. This has led to institutional granny-dumping, where a hospital or nursing facility likewise abandon the elderly person to avoid the expense of their care.

Hospitals generally seek to place an abandoned elderly person with a long-term care or nursing facility, but such facilities may have no capacity, or may refuse to take the patient, who may have no ability to pay. When this occurs, hospitals are faced with the dilemma of either providing care themselves at great expense, or similarly dumping the patient by taking them off of hospital property and leaving them.

Nursing homes may similarly abandon low-income residents by evicting them and leaving them in hotels, homeless shelters, or on the street. Nursing homes may refuse to readmit residents after a trip home. In a granny dumping practice also called hospital dumping, residents may be sent to a hospital for temporary treatment and not permitted to return.

Another form of institutional granny dumping may occur when a nursing home closes, and staff abandon residents in the facility, or leave them in hotels, homeless shelters, or similar. During the COVID-19 pandemic, institutional granny dumping by nursing homes became a widespread problem in the United States as above average numbers of care facilities closed with no alternatives to provide care for the displaced residents.
