= Ubasute =

Mythical practice of senicide in Japan

Coordinates: 36°28′07″N 138°06′24″E

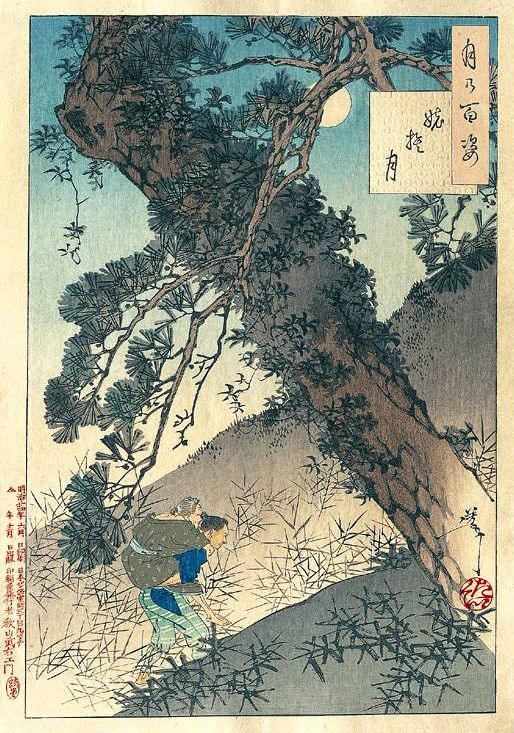
Ubasute no tsuki (The Moon of Ubasute), one of the 100 works in the series One Hundred Aspects of the Moon, by Tsukioka Yoshitoshi

Ubasute (姥捨て, "abandoning an old woman"; also called obasute and sometimes oyasute 親捨て "abandoning a parent") is a mythical practice of senicide in Japan, whereby an infirm or elderly relative was carried to a mountain, or some other remote, desolate place, and left there to die.

Kunio Yanagita concluded that the ubasute folklore comes from India's Buddhist mythology. According to the Kodansha Illustrated Encyclopedia of Japan, ubasute "is the subject of legend, but…does not seem ever to have been a common custom."

== Folklore ==
In one Buddhist allegory, a son carries his mother up a mountain on his back. During the journey, she stretches out her arms, catching the twigs and scattering them in their wake, so that her son will be able to find the way home.

A poem commemorates the story:

In the depths of the mountains,
Whom was it for the aged mother snapped
One twig after another?
Heedless of herself
She did so
For the sake of her son

== In popular culture ==
- The practice of ubasute is explored at length in the Japanese novel The Ballad of Narayama (1956) by Shichirō Fukazawa. The novel was the basis for three films: Keisuke Kinoshita's The Ballad of Narayama (1958), Korean director Kim Ki-young's Goryeojang (1963), and Shohei Imamura's The Ballad of Narayama, which won the Palme d'Or in 1983.
- Ubasute is mentioned in the 2016 American horror film The Forest, as an explanation for why locals believe that the Aokigahara forest is haunted by vengeful wraiths (yūrei).

== Places ==
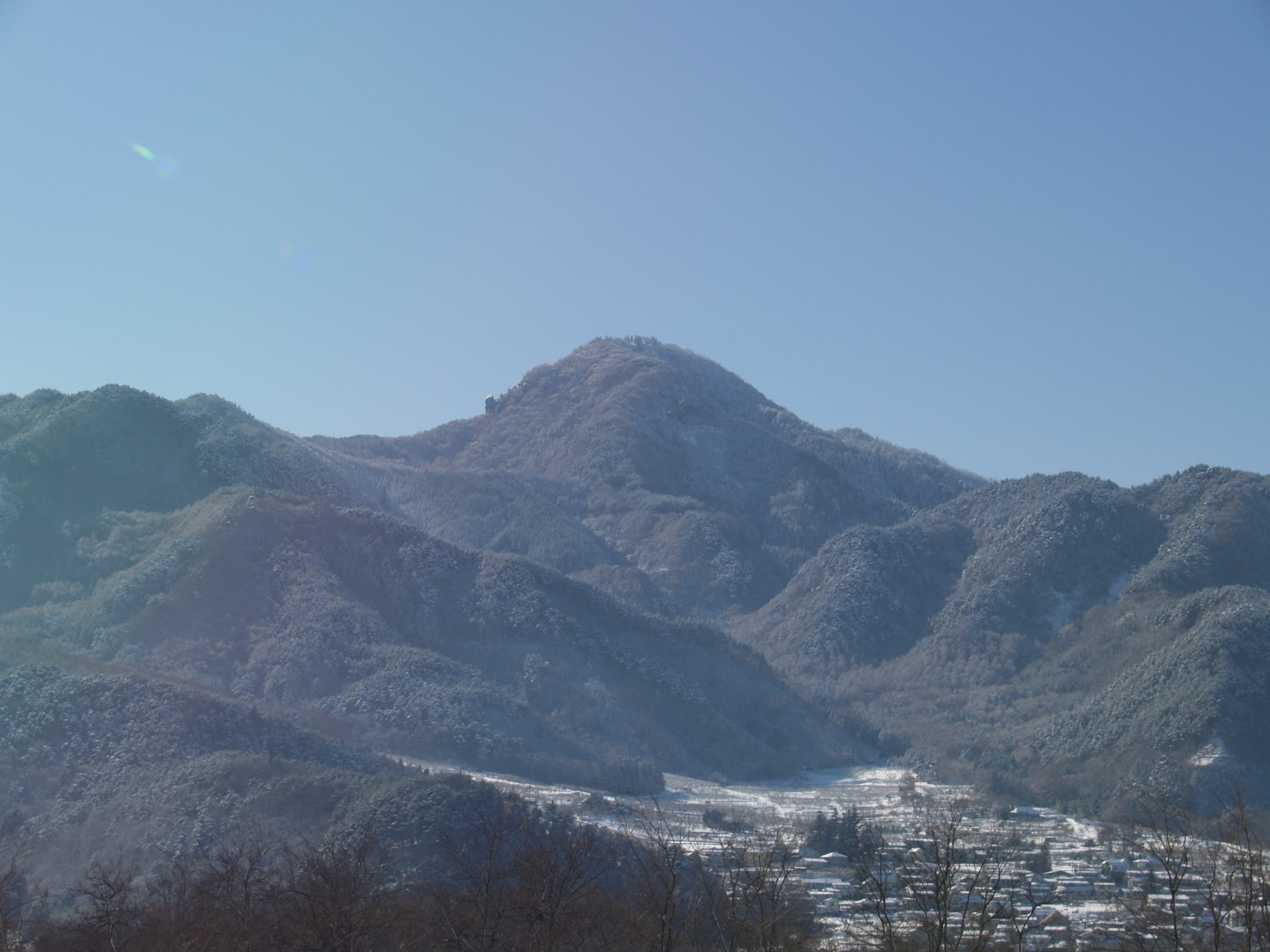
Ubasute Mountain

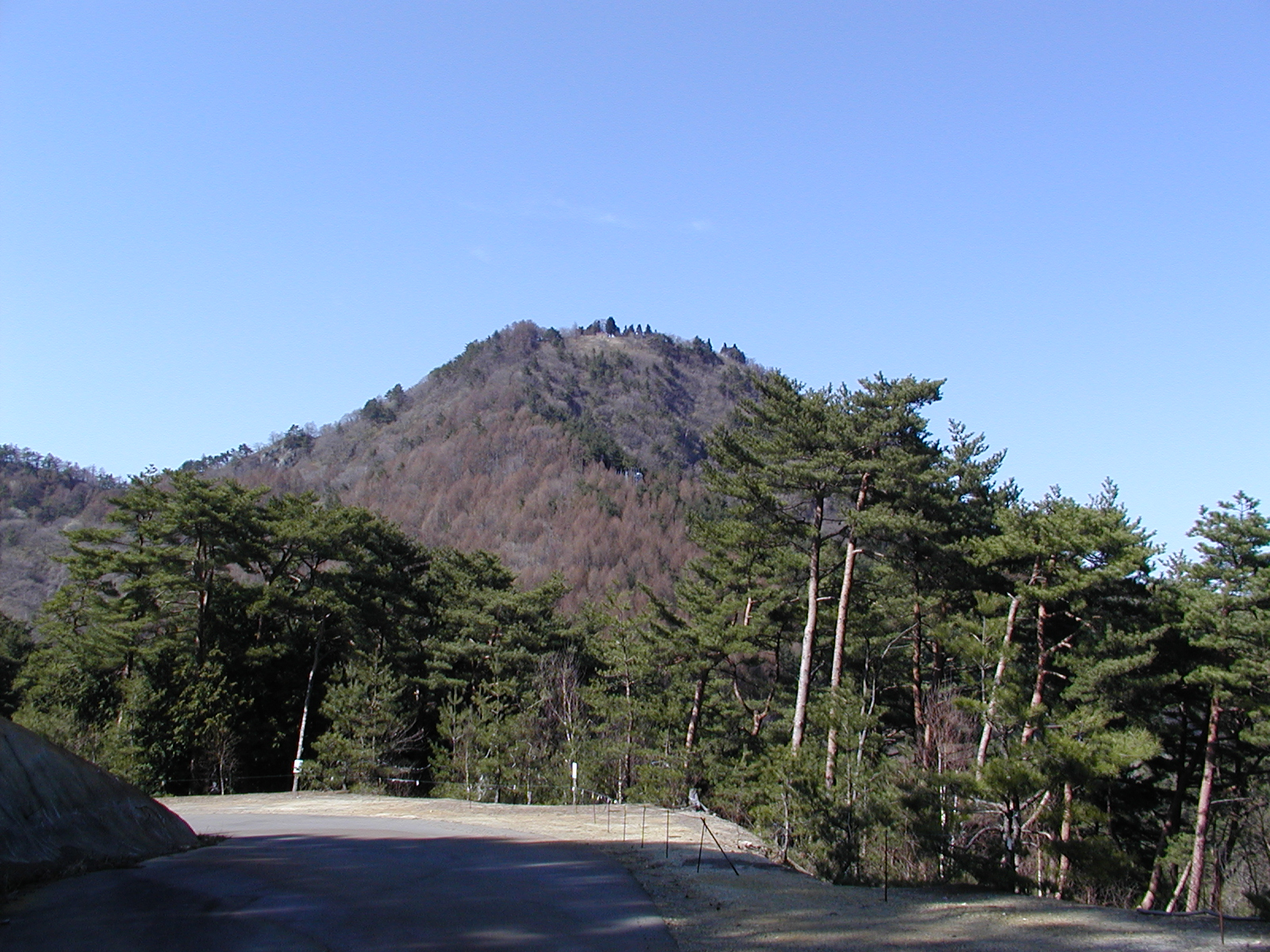
Ubasute Mountain

- Ubasute-yama (姨捨山) is the common name of Kamuriki-yama (冠着山), a mountain (1,252 metres or 4,108 feet) in Chikuma, Nagano, Japan.
- Obasute Station, Chikuma, Nagano Prefecture, Japan
- According to folklore, the Aokigahara forest at the base of Mount Fuji was once such a site, where its reputation as a suicide site might have originated.

== See also ==
- Ättestupa
- Granny dumping
- Lapot
