= Index of Japan-related articles (A) =

This page lists Japan-related articles with romanized titles beginning with the letter A. For names of people, please list by surname (i.e., "Tarō Yamada" should be listed under "Y", not "T"). Please also ignore particles (e.g. "a", "an", "the") when listing articles (i.e., "A City with No People" should be listed under "City").

== A ==
- A.I. Love You

== Ab ==
- Aba, Okayama
- Abashiri, Hokkaidō
- Abashiri Subprefecture
- ABCL/1
- ABCL/R
- ABCL/R2
- Abe clan of Mikawa
- Hiroshi Abe (actor)
- Hiroshi Abe (astronomer)
- Abe Iso
- Kōbō Abe
- Abe Masakatsu
- Abe no Hirafu
- Abe no Seimei
- Nobuyuki Abe
- Sada Abe
- Yutaka Abe
- Abe River
- Shintaro Abe
- Shinzō Abe
- Abenobashi Magical Shopping District
- Abiko, Chiba
- Abolition of the han system
- Abu District, Yamaguchi
- Abu, Yamaguchi
- Abukuma River
- Abura kiri

== Ac ==
- Acala
- Ace File
- ActRaiser
- Acura

== Ad ==
- AD Police
- Adachi clan
- Adachi Kagemori
- Adachi Morinaga
- Adachi, Tokyo
- Adogawa, Shiga
- Adventure Island 2

== Af ==
- After Life (film)

== Ag ==
- Hiromitsu Agatsuma
- Agawa District, Kōchi
- Agawa, Kōchi
- Age District, Mie
- Agedashi tofu
- Agemono nabe
- Ageo, Saitama
- Ago, Mie
- Agon Shu
- Agui, Aichi
- Agumon
- Aguni, Okinawa

== Ai ==
- Aibo
- Aichi B7A
- Aichi D3A
- Aichi District, Aichi
- Aichi Kokuki KK
- Aichi M6A
- Aichi Prefecture
- Aida District, Okayama
- Aida, Okayama
- Show Aikawa
- Aiki Jinja
- Aikido
- Aikido Doshu
- Aikijutsu
- Aikikai Hombu Dojo
- Aiko
- Aim for the Ace!
- Aimi, Tottori
- Minako Aino
- Ainu people
- Ainu language
- Aio, Yamaguchi
- Aioi, Hyōgo
- Aioi, Tokushima
- Air Nippon
- Aira District, Kagoshima
- Aira, Kagoshima
- Aira, Kagoshima (Aira District)
- Aira, Kagoshima (Kimotsuki District)
- Aisai, Aichi
- Aito, Shiga
- Aiwa
- Aizu
- Aizumi, Tokushima
- Aizuwakamatsu

== Aj ==
- Aja Kong
- Aji, Kagawa
- Ajimu, Oita
- Ajisu, Yamaguchi

== Ak ==
- Aka, Fukuoka
- Akabira
- Akagi (manga)
- Akagi (train)
- Akagi, Gunma
- Akagi, Shimane
- Kei Akagi
- Ritsuko Akagi
- Akahata
- Akaike, Fukuoka
- Akaishi Mountains
- Akaiwa District, Okayama
- Ken Akamatsu
- Akan National Park
- Akan, Hokkaido
- Akaoka, Kōchi
- Akasaka, Okayama
- Akasaki, Tottori
- Genpei Akasegawa
- Akashi, Hyōgo
- Akashi Morishige
- Akashi-Kaikyo Bridge
- Akashiyaki
- Akaza Naoyasu
- Akebono Tarō
- Akechi Mitsuharu
- Akechi Mitsuhide
- Akechi, Gifu
- Akehama, Ehime
- Aki District, Kōchi
- Aki District, Hiroshima
- Aki Province
- Aki, Kōchi
- Aki, Oita
- Akihabara
- Akihabara Station
- Akihito
- Akira (manga)
- Akira (1988 film)
- Akiruno, Tokyo
- Akishima, Tokyo
- Akita clan
- Akita Inu
- Akita Prefecture
- Akita Sanesue
- Akita Toshisue
- Akita, Akita
- Akitsu, Hiroshima
- Akiyama Nobutomo
- Akiyama Saneyuki
- Toshiko Akiyoshi
- Akizuki Tanenaga
- Akizuki Tanezane
- Akō, Hyōgo
- Ako District, Hyogo
- Akuma
- Akuma (Street Fighter)
- Akune, Kagoshima
- Akutagawa Prize
- Ryūnosuke Akutagawa

== Al ==
- Albirex Niigata
- Alex Kidd
- Alex Kidd BMX Trial
- Alex Kidd in Miracle World
- Alex Kidd in Shinobi World
- All Japan Kendo Federation
- All Monsters Attack
- All Night Nippon Super Mario Bros.
- All Nippon Airways
- All Nippon Airways Flight 61
- All Purpose Cultural Cat Girl Nuku Nuku
- All your base are belong to us
- Altaic languages

== Am ==
- Ama District, Aichi
- Ama, Shimane
- Ame-no-Uzume
- Amagasaki, Hyogo
- Amagase, Ōita
- Amagi, Fukuoka
- Amago clan
- Amago Haruhisa
- Amago Katsuhisa
- Amago Kunihisa
- Amago Okihisa
- Amago Tsunehisa
- Amago Yoshihisa
- Amakasu Kagemochi
- Amakusa
- Amakusa District, Kumamoto
- Amakusa Shirō
- Amakusa, Kumamoto
- Amami rabbit
- Amanattō
- Yoshitaka Amano
- Amata District, Kyoto
- Amaterasu
- Amazake
- Amazing 3
- Amerikamura
- Ami shakushi
- Ami Yoshida

== An ==
- Anabuki, Tokushima
- Korechika Anami
- Anan, Tokushima
- Ando, Nara
- Toshiyuki Ando
- Android 18
- Hidetsugu Aneha
- Angel Sanctuary
- Angelic Layer
- Nippon Sei Ko Kai
- Anguirus
- The Animatrix
- Anime
- Anime Complex
- Anime International Company
- Aniplex
- Anjo, Aichi
- Anmitsu
- Annaka
- Hideaki Anno
- Ano, Mie
- Anpachi District, Gifu
- Anpachi, Gifu
- Anpan
- Anpanman
- Anrakuan Sakuden
- Anraku-ji (Ueda)
- Anrakuju-in
- Ansei Purge
- Anti-Comintern Pact

== Ao ==
- Aoimori Railway Line
- Aogaki, Hyogo
- Aomori
- Aomori, Aomori
- Aomori Prefecture
- Aoya, Tottori
- Aoyama, Mie
- Gosho Aoyama
- Aozora Bunko

== Ap ==
- APNIC

== Ar ==
- Arahata Kanson
- Arahitogami
- Arai, Niigata
- Arai Akino
- Arai Hakuseki
- Arai, Shizuoka
- Arakawa, Tokyo
- Shizuka Arakawa
- Sadao Araki
- Arao, Kumamoto
- Arashi
- Arashiyama
- Arata
- Ariake, Kagoshima
- Ariake, Kumamoto
- Ariake, Saga
- Arida District, Wakayama
- Arida, Wakayama
- Arisaka
- Arishima Takeo
- Arita, Saga
- Tsugumi Aritomo
- Arkanoid
- Arlong
- Art and architecture of Japan
- Art of Fighting
- Art-name
- Artemis (Sailor Moon)
- Artepiazza
- Article 9 of the Japanese Constitution
- Articuno
- Arts of the Far East

== As ==
- Asa District, Yamaguchi
- Asaba, Shizuoka
- Asagiri, Kumamoto
- Asago District, Hyogo
- Asago, Hyogo
- Shoko Asahara
- Asahi
- Asahi Breweries
- Asahi Camera
- Asahi Glass Co.
- Asahi Kasei
- Asahi Shimbun
- Asahi, Aichi
- Asahi, Chiba
- Asahi, Fukui
- Asahi, Gifu
- Asahi, Hokkaidō
- Asahi, Ibaraki
- Asahi, Mie
- Asahi, Nagano
- Asahi, Niigata
- Asahi, Okayama
- Asahi, Shimane
- Asahi, Toyama
- Asahi, Yamagata (Nishimurayama)
- Asahi, Yamagata (Higashitagawa)
- Asahi, Yamaguchi
- Asahi-ku, Osaka
- Asahikawa, Hokkaidō
- Asahikawa Airport
- Asai Ryōi
- Asaji, Ōita
- Asaka Yasuhiko
- Asaka, Saitama
- Yu Asakawa
- Asakiyumemishi
- Asakuchi District, Okayama
- Asakura District, Fukuoka
- Asakura, Ehime
- Asakura, Fukuoka
- Asakusa
- Asama (Shinkansen)
- Kia Asamiya
- Asano Sōichirō
- Tadanobu Asano
- Asashoryu Akinori
- ASCII (magazine)
- Ashibetsu, Hokkaidō
- Hitoshi Ashida
- Ashigaru
- Ashikaga clan
- Ashikaga clan (Fujiwara)
- Ashikaga era
- Ashikaga Institute of Technology
- Ashikaga Junior College
- Ashikaga murder case
- Ashikaga shogunate
- Ashikaga Station
- Ashikaga Takauji
- Ashikaga, Tochigi
- Ashikaga Yoshiaki
- Ashikaga Yoshiakira
- Ashikaga Yoshiharu
- Ashikaga Yoshihide
- Ashikaga Yoshihisa
- Ashikaga Yoshikatsu
- Ashikaga Yoshikazu
- Ashikaga Yoshimasa
- Ashikaga Yoshimitsu
- Ashikaga Yoshimochi
- Ashikaga Yoshinori
- Ashikaga Yoshitane
- Ashikaga Yoshiteru
- Ashikaga Yoshizumi
- Ashikari, Saga
- Ashikita District, Kumamoto
- Ashikita, Kumamoto
- Ashiya, Fukuoka
- Ashiya, Hyōgo
- Asian Cup 1992
- ASIMO
- Aso District, Kumamoto
- Kumiko Asō
- Aso, Kumamoto
- Assistant Language Teacher
- Astro Boy
- Asuka-dera
- Asuka period
- Asuka, Nara
- Asuke, Aichi

== At ==
- Atami, Shizuoka
- Atetsu District, Okayama
- Atlus
- Ato, Yamaguchi
- Attack on Pearl Harbor
- Atsugi, Kanagawa
- Atsumi District, Aichi
- Atsumi, Aichi
- Kiyoshi Atsumi

== Au ==
- Audition (1999 film)
- Aum Shinrikyo

== Av ==
- Avispa Fukuoka

== Aw ==
- Awa District, Tokushima
- Awa Province (Chiba)
- Awa Province (Tokushima)
- Awa, Tokushima
- Awaji Island
- Awaji Province
- Awaji, Hyogo
- Awara, Fukui

== Ay ==
- Aya, Miyazaki
- Ayabe, Kyoto
- Ayakami, Kagawa
- Ayama District, Mie
- Ayama, Mie
- Haruka Ayase
- Ayase, Kanagawa
- Ayauta District, Kagawa
- Ayauta, Kagawa

== Az ==
- Azai Hisamasa
- Azai Nagamasa
- Azai Sukemasa
- Azai, Shiga
- Myū Azama
- Azuchi-Momoyama period
- Azuchi, Shiga
- Azuki bean
- Kiyohiko Azuma
- Azuma, Gunma (Agatsuma)
- Azuma, Gunma (Sawa)
- Azuma, Gunma (Seta)
- Azuma, Kagoshima
- Azumanga Daioh
