= Amago =

Amago (尼子) is a Japanese word meaning "child of a nun", and has various other uses:

== People ==
- Amago clan, a Japanese daimyō clan
- Amago Haruhisa (1514–1561), Japanese daimyō
- Amago Katsuhisa (1553–1578), Japanese daimyō
- Amago Kunihisa (1492–1554), Japanese daimyō
- Amago Okihisa (1497–1534), Japanese daimyō
- Amago Tsunehisa (1458–1541), Japanese daimyō
- Amago Yoshihisa (1540–1610), Japanese daimyō

== Other uses ==
- Amago Station, a railroad station in Kōra, Shiga, Japan
- Oncorhynchus masou macrostomus or amago, a salmonid fish endemic to western Japan
