= Amorio =

Amorio or Amori may refer to:

- Amorio, Evros, a town in the Evros regional unit, Greece
- Amorium, an ancient city in Phrygia, near modern Emirdağ, Turkey
- Amori (film), a 2019 Indian Konkani-language film
- Amori Station, a railway station in Nagano, Japan

== See also ==
- Amoria (disambiguation)
- Aomori (disambiguation)
