= Siege of Yoshida-Kōriyama Castle =

Siege in 1540–1541 in Aki Province, Japan

Siege of Yoshida-Koriyama Castle
- Part of the Sengoku period
Date	September 1540 to February 1541
Location	Yoshida, Aki Province, Japan
Result	Mōri victory

Belligerents
Amago clan	Mōri clan Ōuchi clan

Commanders and leaders
Amago Haruhisa; Amago Hisayuki†; Kamei Hidetsuna; Kikkawa Okitsune; Kokushou Hisazumi; Misawa Tameyuki†; Takahashi Mototsuna†; Takao Hisatomo; Yonehara Tsunahiro; Yubara Munetsuna†	Mōri Motonari; Kunishi Motosuke; Awaya Motoyoshi; Awaya Motozane; Katsura Motozumi; Kodama Narimitsu; Watanabe Kayou Relief forces: Sue Harukata

Strength
30,000	18,000 total (8,000 Mori; 10,000 Ōuchi relief force)

The siege of Yoshida-Kōriyama Castle (吉田郡山城の戦い, Yoshida-Kōriyama-jō no tatakai) took place from 5 October 1540 (6th day of 9th month of Tenbun 9) until 8 February 1541 (13th day of 1st month of Tenbun 10) in Yoshida, Aki Province, Japan during the Sengoku period. Amago Haruhisa, with 30,000 men, attacked Yoshida-Kōriyama Castle, which belonged to Mōri Motonari and was defended by 8,000 men. When the Ōuchi clan sent an army under the command of Sue Harukata to relieve the siege, the Amago were forced to leave.

== Background ==
By the end of the 1530s, Mōri Motonari had cut ties with the Amago clan (also known as Amago) and realigned himself with the Ōuchi. Taking advantage of the growing weakness of the Takeda clan of Aki, Motonari grew ever more powerful in Aki Province. By 1540, the old lord of the Amago, Tsunehisa had nominally retired and turned over the leadership of the clan to his grandson, Haruhisa (also known as Akihisa.)

In that year Amago Haruhisa conceived of a plan to destroy Mōri Motonari and bring Aki province under the sway of the Amago. When a council of the Amago retainers was called to discuss the planned campaign, almost all spoke in favor of the attack. Amago Hisayuki, however, considered the risks to be too great and spoke out against it, but was derided by Tsunehisa as a coward and publicly humiliated. Hisayuki was given the task of engaging the Mōri's ally, the Shishido clan in Aki as part of an initial and concurrent operation of the larger Amago campaign into Aki.

== Siege ==
=== Amago attack on Yoshida-Kōriyama Castle ===
The initial phase of the campaign began in 19 July 1540 (15th day of 6 month of Tenbun 9), which involved an attack by the troops of Amago Hisayuki, his son Masahisa and his nephew Kunihisa on the domain of Motonari's ally, the Shishido clan, a foray that was to prove of little effect except to deny Haruhisa of some of his most capable generals and soldiers for the attack on Yoshida-Kōriyama Castle. In August Amago Haruhisa had gathered a force of 30,000 and departed Izumo Province, moving into the vicinity of the castle and establishing a headquarters nearby.

Meanwhile, Mōri Motonari had evacuated over 5,000 of Yoshida's citizens inside the walls of Yoshida-Kōriyama Castle. The castle itself was defended by around 3,000 soldiers, by which time urgent requests for aid were dispatched to the Ōuchi in Suo Province. Two days after arriving, the Amago launched an attack on Yoshida-Kōriyama Castle, which continued for several months.

=== The Ōuchi relief ===
The Ōuchi relief army, consisting of 10,000 men led by Sue Harukata, finally departed Suō Province in the 11th month (corresponding to December 1540 in Tenbun 10), pausing on Miyajima to offer prayers for victory at the Itskushima Shrine before landing in Aki and marching towards Yoshida-Kōriyama Castle. They arrived outside it in December 1540, four months after the siege had begun. A series of skirmishes ensued between the opposing armies into the following month (January 1541), which was largely to the detriment of the Amago. By this time the Amago force that had threatened the Shishido arrived and became heavily engaged in an attack by the Mōri and Ōuchi on the Amago's headquarters on Tenjinyama (天神山). In the ensuing action Amago Hisayuki was killed by an arrow on 8 February 1541 (13th day of 1st month of Tenbun 10) and the Amago suffered heavy losses.

In the wake of this fight, the Amago retainers, noting the army's dwindling supplies and poor morale, elected to retreat. The Môri and Ôuchi duly pursued but were hindered by snow.
