= Arata (name) =

Arata is both a Japanese and Italian surname, and a masculine Japanese given name. As an Italian surname, it means "plow", while in Japanese, its meaning depends on the kanji used to write it.

== Surname ==
In Japanese, Arata is typically written using kanji meaning "uncultivated field" (荒田) or "new field" (新田), though dozens of other ways of writing it also exist. People with these surnames include:

- Yukie Arata (荒田 雪江; born 1914), Japanese swimmer
- Yoshiaki Arata (荒田 吉明; 1924–2018), Japanese fusion power researcher
- Hideyuki Arata (新田 英之; born 1980), Japanese academic in the fields of engineering and physics
- Tomoyuki Arata (荒田 智之; born 1985), Japanese football striker in the J-League
- Mackenyu Arata (新田 真剣佑; born 1996), Japanese actor

Arata is also an Italian surname, from a southern Italian word for "plow". People with this surname include:

- Luis Arata (1895–1967), Argentine stage and film actor
- Antonino Arata (1883–1948), Italian prelate of the Catholic Church
- Ubaldo Arata (1895–1947), Italian cinematographer
- Tony Arata (born 1957), American singer-songwriter
- Michael Arata (born 1966), American actor and film producer
- Santiago Arata (born 1996), Uruguayan rugby union player

== Given name ==
As a given name, Arata is typically written using a kanji meaning "new" (新), though other ways of writing it are also seen (e.g. 新太). People with these given names include:

- Hamao Arata (濱尾 新; 1849–1925), Japanese politician and educator
- Arata Endo (遠藤 新; 1889–1951), Japanese architect
- Arata Isozaki (磯崎 新; 1931–2022), Japanese architect
- Arata Kochi (古知 新; born c. 1948), Japanese physician and public health expert
- Arata Furuta (古田 新太; born 1965 as Takafumi Furuta), Japanese actor
- Arata Iura (井浦 新; born 1974), Japanese actor and model
- Tamanoshima Arata (玉乃島 新; born 1977), Japanese sumo wrestler
- Arata Sugiyama (杉山 新; born 1980), Japanese football defender in the J-League
- Arata Fujiwara (藤原 新; born 1981), Japanese marathon runner
- Arata Izumi (和泉 新; born 1982), Japanese football midfielder in the Indian Super League
- Arata Kodama (児玉 新; born 1982), Japanese football defender in the J-League
- Arata Nishikiori (錦織 新; born 1991), Japanese female team handball player
- Arata Sonoda (園田 新; born 1994), Japanese Greco-Roman wrestler
- Arata Shiino (椎野 新; born 1995), Japanese baseball player
- Arata Tatsukawa (立川 新; born 1997), Japanese judoka
- Arata Hirose (広瀬新; born 2014), member of Dianna Project male-only Japanese idol trio Menhamu

Fictional characters with these given names include:

- Arata Wataya (綿谷 新), a main character in the 2000s and 2010s Japanese manga series Chihayafuru
- Arata Kasuga (春日 アラタ), a main character in the 2010s Japanese manga series Trinity Seven
- Arata Tsuchiyu (土湯 新), a character from the 2012–2020 anime series Haikyu!!
- Arata Shindo (慎導灼), a protagonist of the 2019 anime series Psycho-Pass 3
- Arata Sena (瀬名 アラタ), a protagonist of the 2013 anime series Little Battlers Experience WARS
- Arata Kagami (加賀美 新), a character from the 2006 tokusatsu series Kamen Rider Kabuto
