= Uyama =

Uyama is both a Japanese given name and a surname. Notable people with the name include:

- Uyama Hisakane (宇山 久兼; died 1566), Japanese samurai
- Megu Uyama (宇山 芽紅; born 1996), Japanese gymnast
- Satoru Uyama (宇山 賢; born 1991), Japanese épée fencer
