= Hirakawa =

Hirakawa may refer to:

== Places ==
- Hirakawa, Aomori, a Japanese city
- Hirakawa, Yamaguchi

== People with the surname ==
- Daisuke Hirakawa (平川 大輔; born 1973), Japanese voice actor
- Keiko Hirakawa (平川 啓子; born 1955), Japanese sport shooter
- Noritoshi Hirakawa (平川 典俊; born 1960), Japanese photographer
- Ryō Hirakawa (平川 亮; born 1994), Japanese racing driver
- Tadaaki Hirakawa (平川 忠亮; born 1979), Japanese football player
- Tadaichi Hirakawa (平川 唯; 1902–1993), Japanese radio announcer
