= Motosuke =

- Gender: Male

Origin
- Origin: Japanese
- Meaning: Different meanings depending on the kanji used

Motosuke (written: 元助, 元輔, 元相 or 資祐) is a masculine Japanese given name. Notable people with the name include:

- Ikeda Motosuke (池田 元助) (1559–1584), Japanese samurai
- Kiyohara no Motosuke (清原 元輔) (908–990), Japanese poet
- Kunishi Motosuke (国司 元相) (1492–1592), Japanese samurai
- Motosuke Takahashi (高橋 資祐) (1941–2007), Japanese animator, character designer and anime director
