= Hirakawa, Yamaguchi =

Dissolved municipality in Yamaguchi prefecture, Japan

Hirakawa (平川村, Hirakawa-son) was formerly a village located in Yamaguchi Prefecture, Japan. During the Edo period, it consisted of Hirainoshō / Yoshidagō / Tsunetomiho; Kurokawa village; and Hirano village. The village got its name by combining the first kanji in Hirai (平井) with the second kanji in Kurokawa (黒川).

It was located in the former Yoshiki District. On April 1, 1944, the village merged with surrounding 9 municipalities to become the city of Yamaguchi and the village dissolved.

== History ==
- April 1, 1889 - Due to town and village status enforcement, the village was founded within Yoshiki District. At the same time, the villages of Hirai, Kurokawa, and Yoshida merges?
- April 1, 1944 - The village of Hirakawa and the surrounding 9 municipalities (city of Yamaguchi, towns of Ogōri and Ajisu, and the villages of Ōtoshi, Sue, Natajima, Aiofutajima, Kagawa and Sayama) merged to become the new city of Yamaguchi and the village of Hirakawa dissolved.

== Current status ==
The village of Hirakawa became one of the regions of the city of Yamaguchi. Since the 1970s, more young people, mostly students, live in the Yoshida region because Yamaguchi University (Main Campus) has been relocated to the Yoshida Region.

== See also ==
- List of dissolved municipalities of Japan
- List of dissolved municipalities of Yamaguchi Prefecture
