= Saba District, Yamaguchi =

Former district in Yamaguchi prefecture, Japan

Saba (佐波郡, Saba-gun) was a district located in Yamaguchi Prefecture, Japan.

== Population ==
As of 2003, the district had an estimated population of 7,946 and a density of 27.37 persons per km^{2}. The total area was 290.35 km^{2}.

== Former towns and villages ==
- Tokuji 34°11′22″N 131°39′20″E

== History ==
=== Merger ===
On October 1, 2005 - the town of Tokuji, along with the towns of Aio, Ajisu and Ogōri (all from Yoshiki District), was merged with the old city of Yamaguchi (2nd Generation) to create the new and expanded city of Yamaguchi (3rd Generation). Both Yoshiki District and Saba District were dissolved as a result of this merger.
