= Arrata =

Arrata may refer to:

- Alfredo Vera Arrata (born 1935), Ecuadorian politician and Minister of Interior
- Noralma Vera Arrata (born 1936), Ecuadorian prima ballerina and choreographer

== See also ==
- Aratta, land appearing in Sumerian myths surrounding Emmerkar and Lugalbanda, two early and possibly mythical kings of Uruk
- Arata (disambiguation)
