= Arata =

Arata may refer to:

== People ==
- Arata (name)
- Arata (actor), Japanese actor
- Arata (rapper), American rapper

== Places and jurisdictions ==
- Arata River, a river in Gifu Prefecture, Japan
- Curiate Italian for Arathia, a former Ancient city and bishopric in Cappadocia, eastern Anatolia (Asian Turkey), now a Latin Catholic titular see

== See also ==
- Aratta, land appearing in Sumerian myths surrounding Enmerkar and Lugalbanda, two early and possibly mythical kings of Uruk
- Arrata (disambiguation)
