= Tokuji, Yamaguchi =

Dissolved municipality in Yamaguchi prefecture, Japan

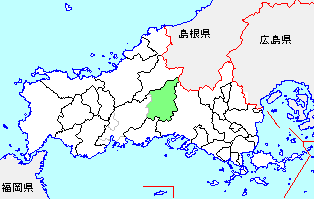
Tokuji in Yamaguchi Prefecture

Tokuji (徳地町, Tokuji-chō) was a town located in Saba District, Yamaguchi Prefecture, Japan.

As of 2003, the town had an estimated population of 7,946 and a density of 27.37 persons per km^{2}. The total area was 290.35 km^{2}.

On October 1, 2005, Tokuji, along with the towns of Aio, Ajisu and Ogōri (all from Yoshiki District), was merged into the expanded city of Yamaguchi.

Tokuji was home to Saba High School, which has a student body of around 100. Tokuji is a location of washi (traditional handmade Japanese paper) making since 1186.
