= Imai Station =

Railway station in Nagano, Nagano Prefecture, Japan

SE10 Imai Station 今井駅
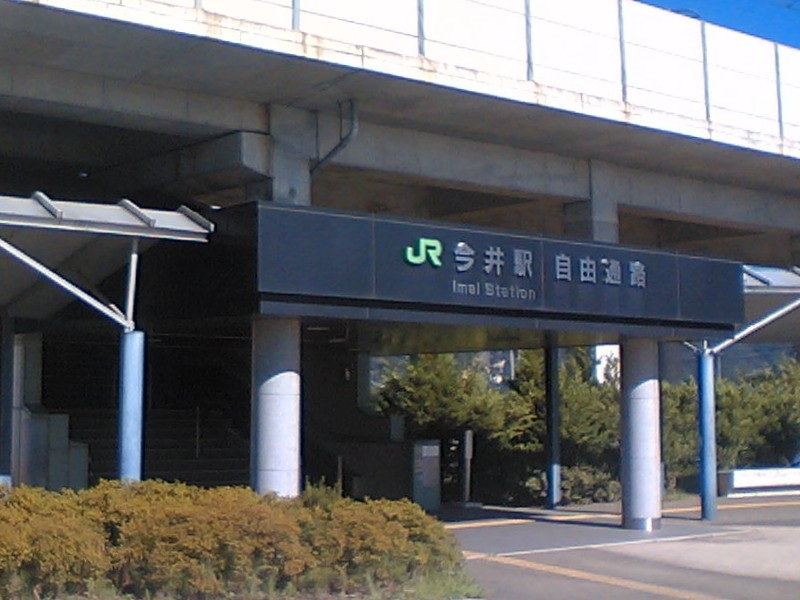
- East entrance of Imai Station, August 2006

General information
- Location: 296-2 Kawanakajima-machi Imai, Nagano-shi, Nagano-ken 381-2226; Japan
- Coordinates: 36.5956°N 138.1453°E
- Elevation: 359.0 meters
- Operator: JR East
- Line: ■ Shin'etsu Main Line
- Distance: 2.1 km from Shinonoi
- Platforms: 2 side platforms
- Tracks: 2

Other information
- Website: Official website

History
- Opened: 1 October 1997

Passengers
- FY2015: 1,966 (daily)

Services
Preceding station	JR East	Following station
Shinonoi SE09 Terminus	Shin'etsu Main Line Shinonoi – Nagano	Kawanakajima SE11 towards Niigata
Shinonoi SN15 towards Shiojiri	Shinonoi Line Local & Rapid Misuzu	Kawanakajima SE11 towards Shinonoi
Preceding station	Shinano Railway	Following station
Shinonoi towards Karuizawa	Shinano Railway Line Local	Kawanakajima towards Nagano
Location
- Location within Nagano Prefecture Location within Japan

Imai Station (今井駅, Imai-eki) is a railway station in the city of Nagano, Nagano Prefecture, Japan.

== Lines ==
Imai Station is served by the Shin'etsu Main Line and is 2.1 kilometers from the terminus of the line at Shinonoi Station. Shinanoi Line and Shinano Railway trains also stop at this station after continuing past the nominal terminus of these lines at Shinanoi en route to Matsumoto.

== Station layout ==
The station consists of two opposed elevated side platforms serving two tracks, with the station building underneath. The station has a Midori no Madoguchi staffed ticket office.

=== Platforms ===
1	■ Shin'etsu Main Line	for Shinonoi, Matsumoto and Shiojiri
	■ Shinonoi Line	for Shinonoi, Matsumoto and Shiojiri
	■ Shinano Railway Line	for Togura, Ueda and Komoro
2	■ Shin'etsu Main Line	for Nagano

== History ==
Imai Station opened on 1 October 1997.

== Passenger statistics ==
In fiscal 2015, the station was used by an average of 1,966 passengers daily (boarding passengers only).

== See also ==
- List of railway stations in Japan
