= Kawanakajima Station =

Railway station in Nagano, Nagano Prefecture, Japan

SE11 Kawanakajima Station 川中島駅
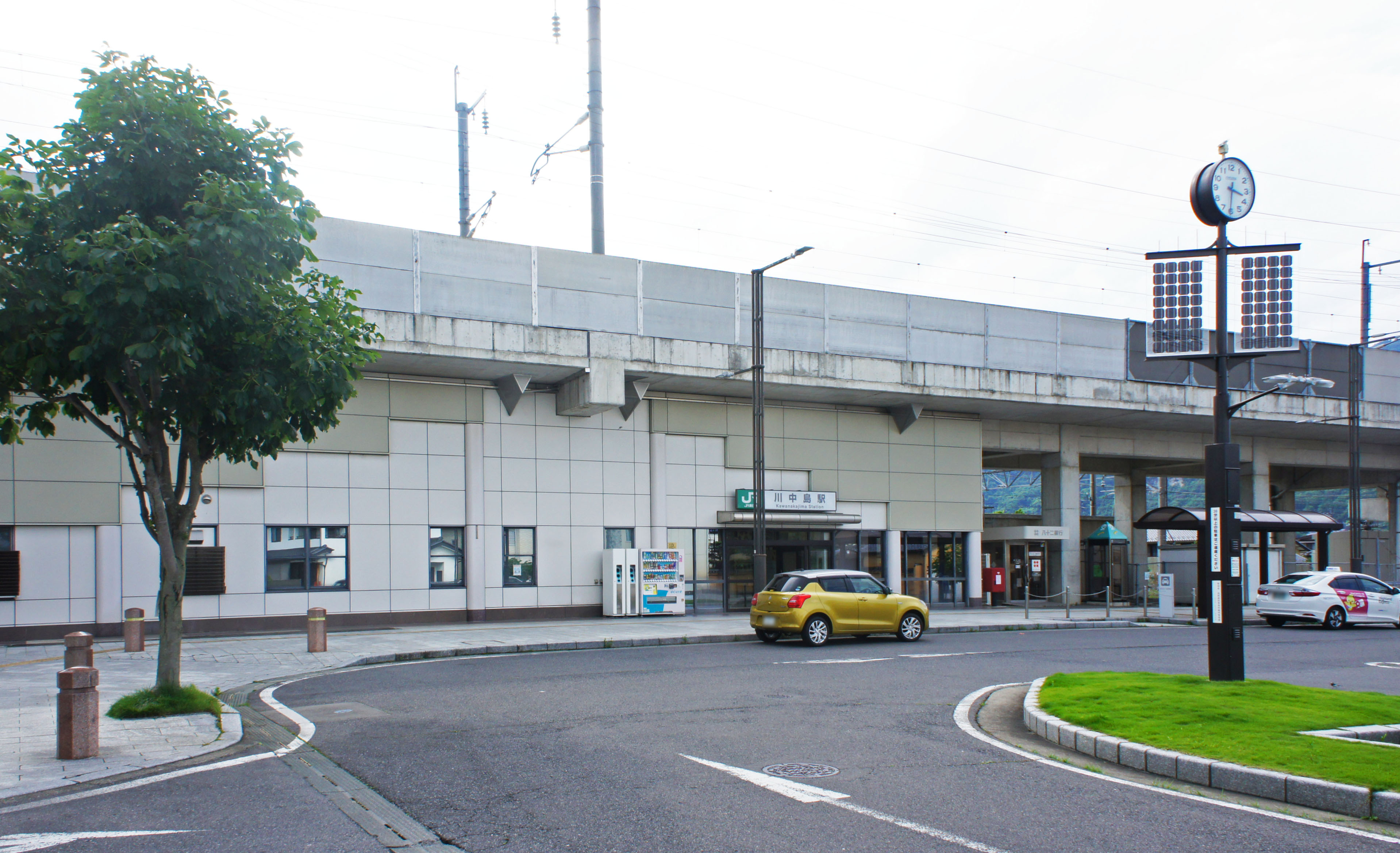
- Kawanakajima Station, July 2021

General information
- Location: Kawanakajima-machi Kamihigano, Nagano-shi, Nagano-ken 381-2233; Japan
- Coordinates: 36.6140°N 138.1509°E
- Elevation: 362.4 meters
- Operator: JR East; JR Freight
- Line: ■ Shin'etsu Main Line
- Distance: 4.3 km from Shinonoi
- Platforms: 1 island platform
- Tracks: 2

Other information
- Website: Official website

History
- Opened: 20 July 1917

Passengers
- FY2015: 1,585 (daily)

Services
Preceding station	JR East	Following station
Imai SE10 towards Shinonoi	Shin'etsu Main Line Shinonoi – Nagano	Amori SE12 towards Niigata
Shinonoi SE09 towards Shiojiri	Shinonoi Line Rapid (limited service)	Nagano SE13 towards Shinonoi
Imai SE10 towards Shiojiri	Shinonoi Line Local & Rapid Misuzu	Amori SE12 towards Shinonoi
Preceding station	Shinano Railway	Following station
Shinonoi towards Karuizawa	Shinano Railway Line Rapid	Nagano Terminus
Imai towards Karuizawa	Shinano Railway Line Local	Amori towards Nagano
Location
- Location within Nagano Prefecture Location within Japan

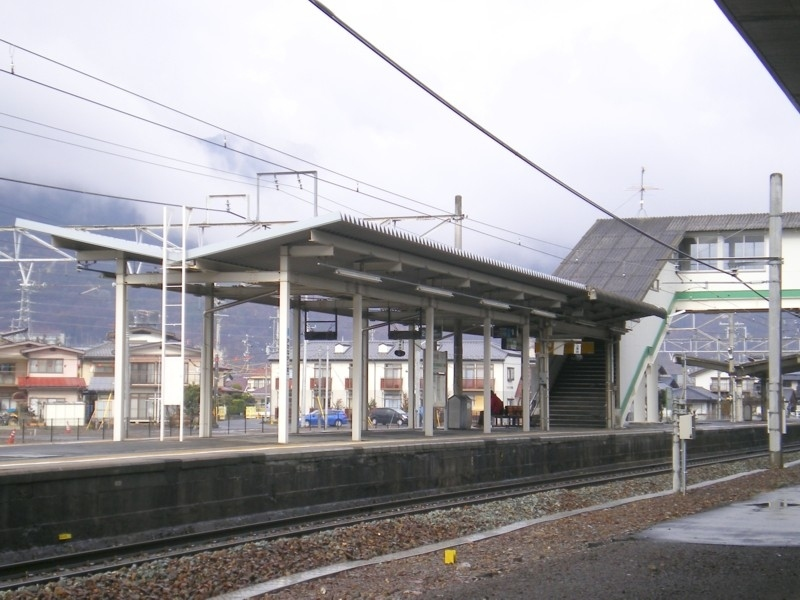
Platform

Kawanakajima Station (川中島駅, Kawanakajima-eki) is a railway station in the city of Nagano, Nagano Prefecture, Japan.

== Lines ==
Kawanakajima Station is served by the Shin'etsu Main Line and is 4.3 kilometers from the terminus of the line at Shinonoi Station. Shinanoi Line and Shinano Railway trains also stop at this station after continuing past the nominal terminus of these lines at Shinanoi en route to Matsumoto. The station is also a freight terminal for the Japan Freight Railway Company (JR Freight).

== Station layout ==
The station consists of one ground-level island platform serving two tracks, connected to the station building by a footbridge. The station has a Midori no Madoguchi staffed ticket office.

=== Platforms ===
1	■ Shin'etsu Main Line	for Shinonoi, Matsumoto and Shiojiri
	■ Shinonoi Line	for Shinonoi, Matsumoto and Shiojiri
	■ Shinano Railway Line	for Togura, Ueda and Komoro
2	■ Shin'etsu Main Line	for Nagano

== History ==
Kawanakajima Station opened on 20 July 1917. With the privatization of Japanese National Railways (JNR) on 1 April 1987, the station came under the control of JR East.

== Passenger statistics ==
In fiscal 2015, the station was used by an average of 1,585 passengers daily (boarding passengers only).

== Surrounding area ==
- site of the Battle of Kawanakajima

== See also ==
- List of railway stations in Japan
