= Yoshiki District, Yamaguchi =

Former district in Yamaguchi prefecture, Japan

Yoshiki (吉敷郡, Yoshiki-gun) was a district located in Yamaguchi Prefecture.

As of 2003, the district had a total estimated population of 39,900 and the total area was 82.98 km^{2}.

Before its dissolution, it included three towns:

- Aio
- Ajisu
- Ogōri

On October 1, 2005, theses towns, along with the town of Tokuji (from Saba District), were merged with the old city of Yamaguchi to create the new and expanded city of Yamaguchi. Yoshiki District was dissolved as a result of this merger.

== District Timeline ==
=== Mergers and separations ===
- 1889 - Due to enforcement of the town and village system in Japan, the town of Yamaguchi and the villages of Kami-unorei, Shimo-unorei, Yoshiki, Miyano, Ōuchi, Hirakawa, Yabara-asada, Niho, Osaba, Daidō, Suzenji, Sue, Natajima, Ogōri, Kagawa, Aiofutajima, Aio, Iseki, Higashi-kiwa and Nishi-kiwa were formed as Yoshiki District. (1 town, 20 villages)
- July 1, 1898 - The village of Yabara-asada changed its name to the village of Ōtoshi.
- April 1, 1899 - The village of Sayama broke off from the village of Iseki. (1 town, 21 villages)
- August 1, 1901 - The village of Ogōri was elevated to town status to become the town of Ogōri. (2 towns, 20 villages)
- April 1, 1905 - The town of Yamaguchi absorbed the village of Kami-unorei. (2 towns, 19 villages)
- July 1, 1915 - The town of Yamaguchi absorbed the village of Shimo-unorei. (2 towns, 18 villages)
- April 10, 1929 - The town of Yamaguchi, and the village of Yoshiki were merged to form the city of Yamaguchi. (1 town, 17 villages)
- April 29, 1940 - The village of Aio was elevated to town status to become the town of Aio. (2 towns, 16 villages)
- November 3, 1940 - The village of Iseki was renamed and elevated to town status to become the town of Ajisu. (3 towns, 15 villages)
- April 1, 1941 - The village of Miyano was merged into the city of Yamaguchi. (3 towns, 14 villages)
- November 1, 1943 - The village of Nishi-kiwa was merged into the city of Ube. (3 towns, 13 villages)
- April 1, 1944 - The towns of Ogōri and Ajisu, and the villages of Hirakawa, Ōtoshi, Sue, Natajima, Aiofutajima, Kagawa and Sayama were merged with the city of Yamaguchi to become the new city of Yamaguchi. (1 town, 6 villages)
- November 23, 1947 - The town of Ajisu broke off from the city of Yamaguchi. (2 towns, 6 villages)
- November 1, 1949 - The town of Ogōri broke off from the city of Yamaguchi. (3 towns, 6 villages)
- October 1, 1954 - The village of Higashi-kiwa was merged into the city of Ube. (3 towns, 5 villages)
- April 1, 1955 - The villages of Ōuchi, Niho and Osaba were merged to create the town of Ōuchi. (4 towns, 2 villages)
- April 10, 1955 - The village of Daidō was merged into the city of Hōfu. (4 towns, 1 village)
- November 3, 1956 - The village of Suzenji was merged into the city of Yamaguchi. (4 towns)
- May 1, 1963 - The town of Ōuchi was merged into the city of Yamaguchi. (3 towns)
- October 1, 2005 - The towns of Aio, Ajisu and Ogōri, along with the town of Tokuji (from Saba District), were merged with the old city of Yamaguchi to create the new and expanded city of Yamaguchi. Yoshiki District was dissolved as a result of this merger.

== See also ==
- List of dissolved districts of Japan
