= List of Trinity Seven characters =

The major characters of the series as they appear in the manga.

The following is a list of characters from the Trinity Seven manga series.

== Main characters ==
=== Arata Kasuga ===
Voiced by: Yoshimasa Hosoya (drama CD), Yoshitsugu Matsuoka (anime) (Japanese); Cameron Bautsch (English)

Arata Kasuga (春日 アラタ, Kasuga Arata) is the main protagonist of the series and the Demon Lord (魔王, Maō) of the Superbia archive, possessing the ability to nullify and copy magic. After a Breakdown Phenomenon destroys his hometown and causes his cousin Hijiri to disappear (but not before giving him her grimoire), Arata becomes determined to save her by becoming a magus and transferring to the Royal Biblia Academy where he meets the Trinity Seven. He is calm in dealing with adversity (and often breaks the fourth wall). He is often referred to as the "Demon Lord Candidate" because only those mages of Demon Lord-class are able to create worlds, but actually the world he created was merely a wish that he had made with the grimoire to return the world the way it was. As a mage researches the one thing that is the farthest away from them, his thema is Impel (支配(インペル), Inperu; lit. 'Control').

==== Sora ====
Voiced by: Mariya Ise (drama CD), Rie Kugimiya (anime) (Japanese); Jad Saxton (English)

Sora (ソラ) is the grimoire that Arata holds. She was called as Sora by Hijiri before she is given to Arata and before the Breakdown Phenomenon. Arata ordered her to bring back his normal days in his desperation, and she recreates the world in a different dimension, posing as Hijiri until Lilith's arrival. She is also known as Astil Manuscript (アスティルの写本, Asutiru no Shahon). It is rumored that she had knowledge from other worlds.

==== Ilia ====
Voiced by: Chinatsu Akasaki (Japanese); Melissa Molano (English)

Ilia (イリア) is another grimoire that Arata holds. She took on Hijiri's memories and appearance and acted as a substitute. Whenever Hijiri was out of the house on magus duty, she would take her place and cook for Arata or do the household chores. She later submitted herself to Arata in order to escape the world that she created to trap Mira and Arata. She is also known as Ilias Fragment (イーリアス断章, Īriasu Danshō).

=== Hijiri Kasuga ===
Voiced by: Noriko Shitaya (drama CD), Ayaka Suwa (anime) (Japanese); Kira Vincent Davis (English)

Hijiri Kasuga (春日 聖, Kasuga Hijiri), disguised as Arata's cousin, was a magus before she was engulfed by the Breakdown Phenomenon that Arata created. Later, she was 'reborn' to become the member of Iscariot, which seeks to destroy the cycle of the Demon Lord and the Trinity Seven, destroying the world and the rebirth of the world. Although she becomes Arata's enemy, she still values Arata more highly than anything and wishes to make a world Arata could enjoy freely. She is referred to as the "Fallen Saint" by Anastasia-L during their encounter. She is a magus of the Ira (Wrath) archive with the themas Ruina (Ruin), Partum (Birth), and Analysis (Disassembly).

=== Trinity Seven ===
==== Lilith Asami ====
Voiced by: Ai Kayano (drama CD), Yumi Hara (anime) (Japanese); Allison Sumrall (English)

Lilith Asami (浅見 リリス, Asami Ririsu) is the Trinity Seven of Luxuria (Lust) and her magic Outer Alchemic (錬金術(アウター・アルケミック)) materializes in the form of a gun which comes in two versions: a short pistol that she utilizes in close quarter combat and a long rifle that resembles an anti-tank gun which she uses at long range. Although she is the same age as Arata and wears the same uniform as the rest of the female students of Royal Biblia Academy, she is actually a teacher of the academy. She is the first magus to appear in front of Arata during the Black Sun gravitational phenomenon incident in Arata's world where she was sent to investigate it; this incident eventually led her to introducing him to the academy. She becomes one of his earliest allies and friend, watching and supporting him in any way, though at times she becomes an unwitting victim of his unintended and indirect perversion. As she is rather prudish, her thema is Abies (生命(アビエス), Abiesu; lit. 'Life') from the Luxuria (Lust) archive. According to Hijiri, she is considered a prodigy and is the youngest to join the Trinity Seven.

==== Arin Kannazuki ====
Voiced by: Noriko Shitaya (drama CD), Aya Uchida (anime) (Japanese); Christina Stroup (English)

Arin Kannazuki (神無月 アリン, Kannazuki Arin) is the Trinity Seven of Ira (Anger) and user of Chaotic Rune magic, whose appearance is strikingly similar to Hijiri. She has a stoic personality where she has no reservation or shame about doing what she wants in front of Arata. She was first seen naked in the boys' bathroom when Arata went in for a bath. She is also the Demon Lord's partner, becoming an early ally and later close friend to Arata. She claims herself to be Arata's wife as he is the Demon Lord candidate. As she only shows little emotion much less and can't even imagine destructive anger, her thema is Ruina (崩壊(ルイーナ), Ruīna; lit. 'Ruin') from the Ira (Anger) Archive. Her magic, Chaosic Rune (聖儀術(カオシック・ルーン), Kaoshikku Rūn), allows her to put up barriers and create destruction.

==== Levi Kazama ====
Voiced by: Saki Fujita (drama CD), Ayane Sakura (anime) (Japanese); Carli Mosier (English)

Levi Kazama (風間 レヴィ, Kazama Revi) is a ninja and the Trinity Seven of Invidia, as well as a student at the Royal Biblia Academy. As a user of Shamanic Spells (忍法術(シャーマニック・スペル), Shāmanikku Superu), she is considered to be one of the world's top five fighters, becoming one of Arata's earliest allies. She is the only member of the Trinity Seven that hasn't been seen naked by Arata, and her naked body is considered by Arata to be his "final frontier". She often desires to fight Akio in a one-on-one fight, but has never had the opportunity to do so. Due to being a ninja, who often works alone, she doesn't expect anything from others and thus her thema is Expectatio (期待(エクスペクト), Ekusupekuto; lit. 'Expectation') from the Invidia (Envy) Archive.

==== Mira Yamana ====
Voiced by: Suzuko Mimori (drama CD), Yōko Hikasa (anime) (Japanese); Chelsea McCurdy (English)

Mira Yamana (山奈 ミラ, Yamana Mira) is the Head of Grimoire Security (王立図書館検閲官(グリモワールセキュリティ), Gurimowāru Sekyuriti; lit. 'Royal Library Censorate') and one of the Trinity Seven. She treats Arata with hostility, but later warms up to Arata during the investigation of the Liber Academy's disappearance where they are stuck in the world created by Ilya. Her orb is her grimoire. Her thema is Justitia (Justice), which is part of the Superbia (Pride) Archive, like Arata. It allows her to activate the "Gehenna Scope" (映晶術(ゲヘナ・スコープ), Gehena Sukōpu), which she uses to analyze and counter any magic.

==== Akio Fudō ====
Voiced by: Yū Kobayashi (drama CD), Ryōka Yuzuki (anime); Patricia Duran (English)

Akio Fudō (不動 アキオ, Fudō Akio) is the partner of Mira in operating Grimoire Security as well as a member of the Trinity Seven. She was a spriggan (秘宝巫女(スプリガン), supurigan; lit. 'secret treasure priestess') who lived in a town that rested underneath the Sky Library, guarding it; however, the Demon Lord from another world, Abyss Trinity, used the weapons of the Sky Library to destroy the city. Her mother had sufficient power to save only one person and chose Akio, making her the only survivor of her home town. In the process, she lost her faith, so that her thema is Fides (信仰(フィデス), Fidesu; lit. 'Faith'), which is part of the Gula (Gluttony) archive. Her magic, Mantra Enchant (真言術(マントラ・エンチャント), Mantora Enchanto), gives her superior physical skills that she uses for close combat.

==== Yui Kurata ====
Voiced by: Rumi Ōkubo (drama CD), Rie Murakawa (anime) (Japanese); Cynthia Martinez (English)

Yui Kurata (倉田 ユイ, Kurata Yui) is a special magus who lives in the dungeon underneath the academy and is also a member of the Trinity Seven. She is first introduced when she saves Arata from being killed by Akio by teleporting him to her dream world. She helped him to understand magic by explaining to him the concept of archives and themas. Later, when she was rescued by Arata and other Trinity Seven members, Yui is able to return to a normal life with other people and Levi as her close friend. She constantly shows her affection to Arata. She is known to be a Cardinal-Class magus, second only to the Biblia Academy headmaster. As she secludes herself from others, her thema is Amicitia (友情(アミキティア), Amikitia; lit. "Friendship), which is part of the Avaritia (Greed) archive. Her magic, Arch Symphony (重唱術(アーク・シンフォニー), Āku Shinfonī), allows her to boost the magic of others.

==== Lieselotte Sherlock ====
Voiced by: Ayumi Fujimura, (drama CD), Nao Tōyama (anime) (Japanese); Shelby Blocker (English)

Lieselotte Sherlock (リーゼロッテ = シャルロック, Rīzerotte Sharurokku) is the older twin sister of Selina who vanished in a school library six months before Arata enrolled at this school. She is the last of the Trinity Seven to meet Arata. At first, she was opposed by the other members of the Trinity Seven because she infiltrated the forbidden library, which is the 'eternal library', and obtained the Demon Lord element sealed in the library to become the Demon Lord candidate. After being defeated during the attack on the academy, Arata rescues her from the time dimension she is trapped in during the investigation on the Sky Library. She, like Arata and the principal, speak in a somewhat perverted manner. As a restless girl, her thema is Stagna (停滞(スタグナ), Sutaguna; lit. 'Stagnation'), which is part of the Acedia (Sloth) archive. Her magic, Logos Art (数秘術(ロゴス・アート), Rogosu Āto), allows her to steal the magic of others.

== Supporting characters ==
=== Selina Sherlock ===
Voiced by: Shiori Mikami (drama CD), Aya Suzaki (anime) (Japanese); Brittney Karbowski (English)

Selina Sherlock (セリナ = シャルロック, Serina Sharurokku) is the younger twin sister of Lieselotte, and student reporter in Royal Biblia Academy. Because her elder sister is a member of Trinity Seven, Selina becomes closely affiliated with some of the other members and later Arata as well. Her thema is Ligare (束縛(リガーレ), Rigāre; lit. 'Bind').

=== Headmaster ===
Voiced by: Kōji Yusa (drama CD), Shin-ichiro Miki (anime) (Japanese); Kregg Dailey (English)

The Headmaster (学園長, Gakuenchō) is a Paladin-Class mage who presides over the Biblia Magic Academy. He usually speaks in somewhat a relaxed and perverted manner. Early in the series, he is said to be one of the five most powerful mages in the world.

=== Master Liber ===
Voiced by: Nanami Yamashita (Japanese); Chaney Moore (English)

Master Liber (マスターリベル, Mastā Liberu) is a Paladin Class mage and headmaster of Royal Liber Academy, which has been destroyed. She is the head of the Iscariot.

=== Abyss Trinity ===
Voiced by: Tomoaki Maeno

Abyss Trinity (アビィス トリニティ, Abisu Toriniti) is the Crimson Demon Lord and the Demon Lord of Luxuria. He is Lilith's father, which gave Lilith her Demon Lord element.

=== Lugh ===
Voiced by: Ayaka Fukuhara (Japanese); Shunte Lofton (English)

Lugh (ルーグ, Rūgu) is a member of Iscariot, magus of the Invidia Archive and a thief.

=== Lilim ===
Voiced by: Rina Hidaka

Lilim (リリム, Ririmu) is a girl who appeared when Arata touched Lilith's "Hermes Apocrypha" Grimoire. She calls Arata and Lilith "Papa" and "Mama."

=== Last Trinity ===
Voiced by: Nobunaga Shimazaki

Last Trinity (ラスト・トリニティ, Rasuto Toriniti) is the head of the Eternal Library, the White Demon Lord. He was brought into existence solely to fight Arata, the Demon Lord candidate. He can cause Breakdown Phenomena, and plots to destroy the world.

=== Anastasia-L ===
Voiced by: M.A.O

Anastasia-L (アナスタシア = L, Anasutashia-L) is a mysterious girl from the Royal Akasha Academy who Arata meets and becomes captivated by during the Biblia Academy school festival. Eventually, she is later revealed to be a former Akasha student who died and recently became resurrected. She is referred to as the "Saint of Resurrection" by Hijiri and referred to Hijiri as the "Fallen Saint" during their encounter during the Biblia Academy school festival. Her thema is Terminus (終焉(ターミナス), Tāminasu; lit. 'Demise').

=== Master Akasha ===
Voiced by: Yoshino Nanjō

Master Akasha (マスター・アカーシャ, Masutā Akāsha) is the principal of the Royal Akasha Academy who works alongside Anastasia-L.
