= Amago clan =

Japanese Clan

Amago 尼子
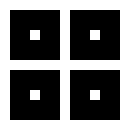
- The emblem (mon) of the Amago clan
- Home province: Izumo
- Parent house: Sasaki clan
- Titles: Various
- Founder: Sasaki Takahisa
- Final ruler: Amago Yoshihisa
- Founding year: 14th century
- Ruled until: 1566, Fall of Gassantoda Castle

The Amago clan (尼子氏, Amago-shi), descended from the Emperor Uda (868–897) by the Kyogoku clan, descending from the Sasaki clan (Uda Genji).

Kyogoku Takahisa in the 14th century, lived in Amako-go (Izumo Province), and took the name 'Amago'. The family crest is also that of the Kyogoku clan.

They were Shugodai (vice-Governors) of Izumo and Oki provinces for generations, for the Kyogoku Shugo branch, and their seat was Gassan Toda castle.

In 1484, Amago Tsunehisa (1458–1541), was deprived of the position of Shugodai by Kyogoku Masatsune, who was the Shugo, because he did not obey the request of tax from the Muromachi bakufu, and was expelled from Gassan Toda castle. Although Enya Kamonnosuke was dispatched to Gassan Toda castle as the new Shugodai, Tsunehisa recaptured Gassan Toda castle by a surprise attack in 1486, took control of Izumo, and developed the Amago clan into a Sengoku Daimyo clan.

The Amago fought the Ōuchi clan or the Mōri clan (who had been among their vassals), during Japan's Sengoku period.

For much of the next hundred years, the clan battled with the Ōuchi and Mōri, who controlled neighboring provinces, and fell into decline when Gassantoda Castle fell to the Mōri in 1566.

Amago Katsuhisa tried to regain prestige for the clan by joining the forces of Oda Nobunaga, invaded Tajima and Inaba Provinces, but was defeated and died in the siege of Kōzuki by the Mōri in 1578.

== Clan heads ==
1. Amago Takahisa (尼子高久, 1363–1391)
2. Amago Mochihisa (尼子持久, 1381–1437)
3. Amago Kiyosada (尼子清定, 1410–1488)
4. Amago Tsunehisa (尼子経久, 1458–1541)
5. Amago Haruhisa (尼子晴久, 1514–1561)
6. Amago Yoshihisa (尼子義久, 1540–1610)
7. Amago Motosato (尼子元知, 1572 or 1598–1622)
8. Amago Nariyasu (尼子就易, ? –1659)
9. Amago Ujihisa (尼子氏久, 1646–1710)
10. Amago Motouji (尼子元氏, ? –1730)
11. Amago Tokihisa (尼子時久, 1690–1752)
12. Amago Narikiyo (尼子就清, 1721–1788)
13. Amago Fusataka (尼子房高, 1754–1827)
14. Amago Motohisa (尼子元久)
15. Amago Chikanobu (尼子親辰)
16. Amago Michisuke (尼子道介)
17. Amago Shigehisa (尼子薫久)
18. Amago Torasuke (尼子寅介)

== Notable members ==
- Amago Kiyosada (d. 1487)
- Amago Tsunehisa (1458–1541)
- Amago Hisayuki (d. 1541)
- Amago Masahisa (1488–1513)
- Amago Okihisa (1497–1534)
- Amago Haruhisa (1514–1562)
- Amago Kunihisa (d. 1554)
- Amago Masahisa (d. 1554)
- Amago Katsuhisa (1553–1578)
- Amago Yoshihisa (1540–1610)

== Retainers and vassals ==
The Amago's chief generals were called Amago 10 Yushi (尼子十勇士).

- Yamanaka Yukimori (1544–1578)
- Akiage Iorinosuke
- Yokoji Hyogonosuke (d. 1570)
- Ueda Saenosuke
- Teramoto Seishinosuke
- Motomo Dorinosuke
- Kogura Nezuminosuke
- Fukada Doronosuke
- Hayakawa Ayunosuke
- Yabunaka Ibaranosuke

Other vassals:

- Uyama Hisakane
- Tachihara Hisatsuna
- Ushio Yoshikiyo

== Amago Jikki ==
Amago clan's 10 castles (Defense network and 10 supporting castles of Gassantoda Castle called Amago Jikki.)

- Shiraga Castle (白鹿城)
- Mitoya Castle (三刀屋城)
- Mizawa Castle (三沢城)
- Akana Castle (赤穴城)
- Ushio Castle (牛尾城)
- Takase Castle (高瀬城)
- Jinzai Castle (神西城)
- Kumano Castle (熊野城)
- Daisai Castle (大西城)
- Maki Castle (真木城)

=== Gallery ===
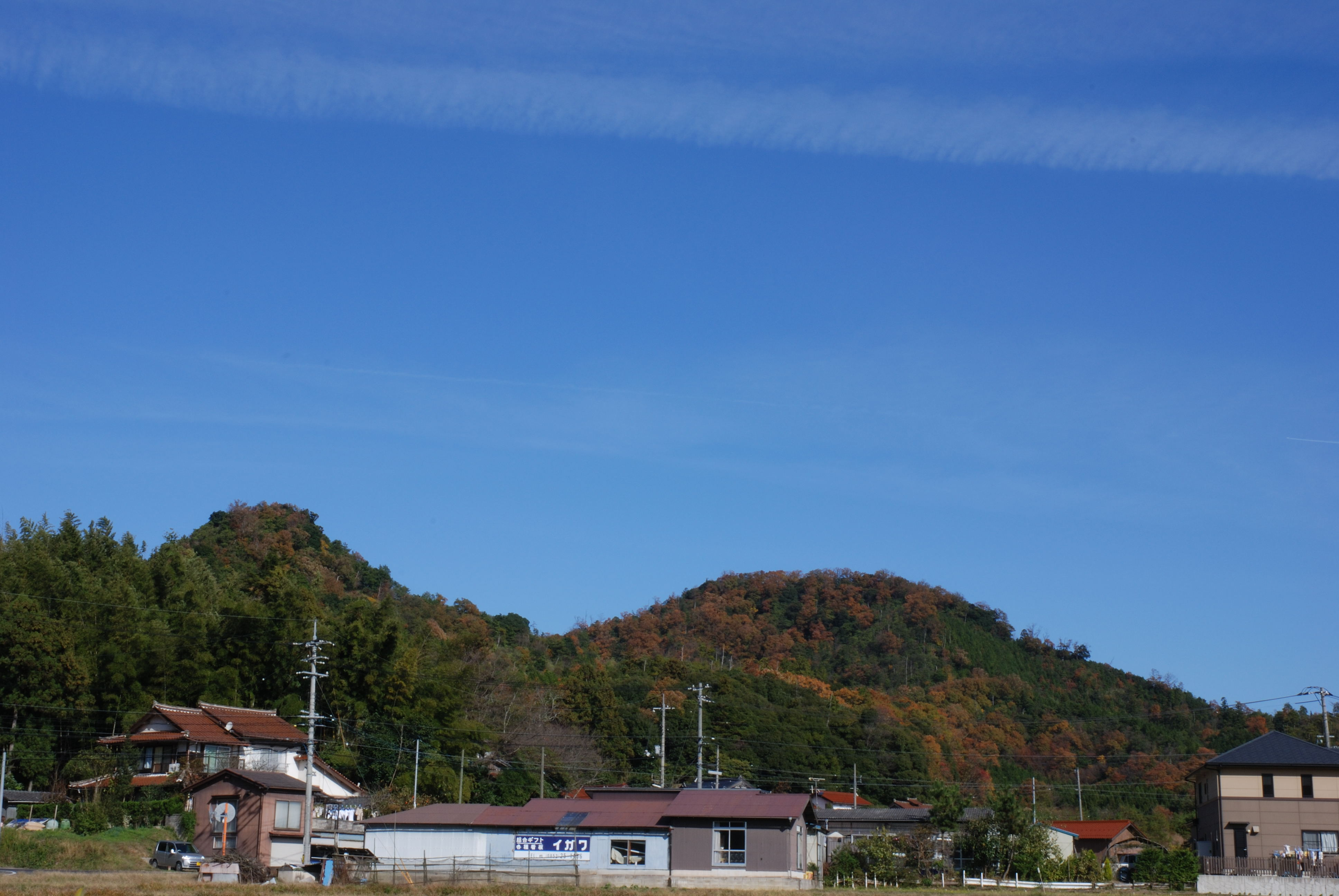
Shiraga Castle

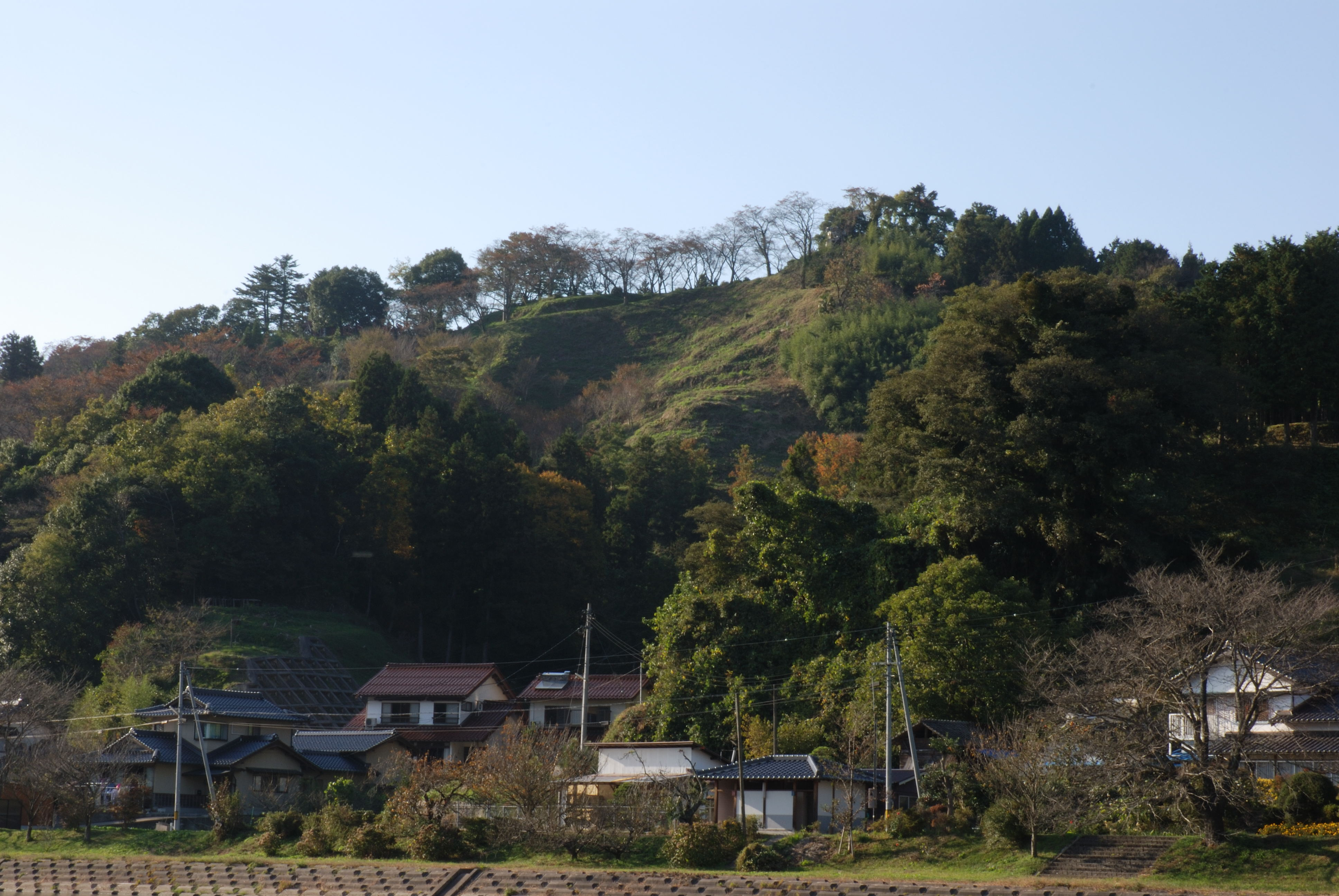
Mitoya Castle

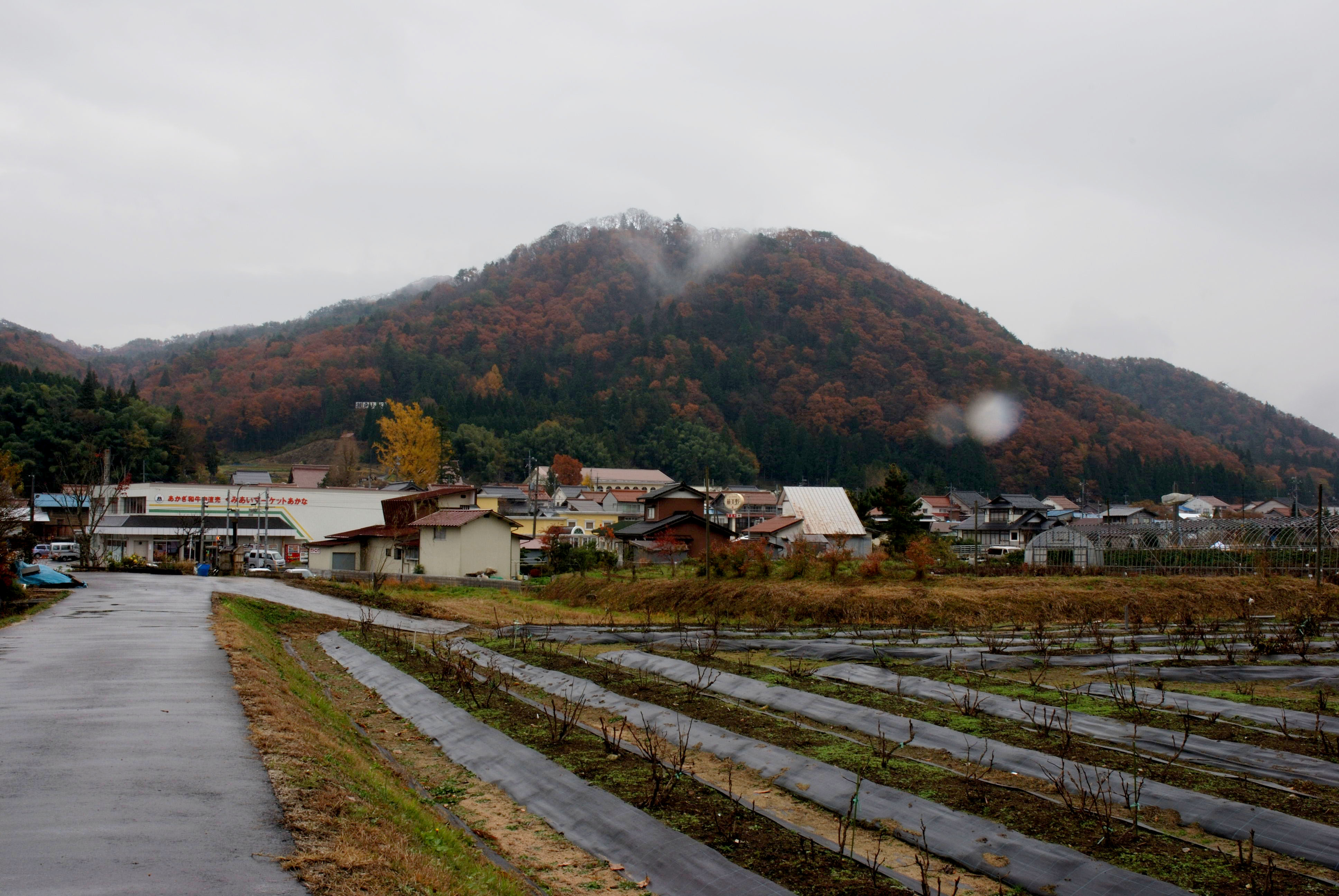
Akana Castle

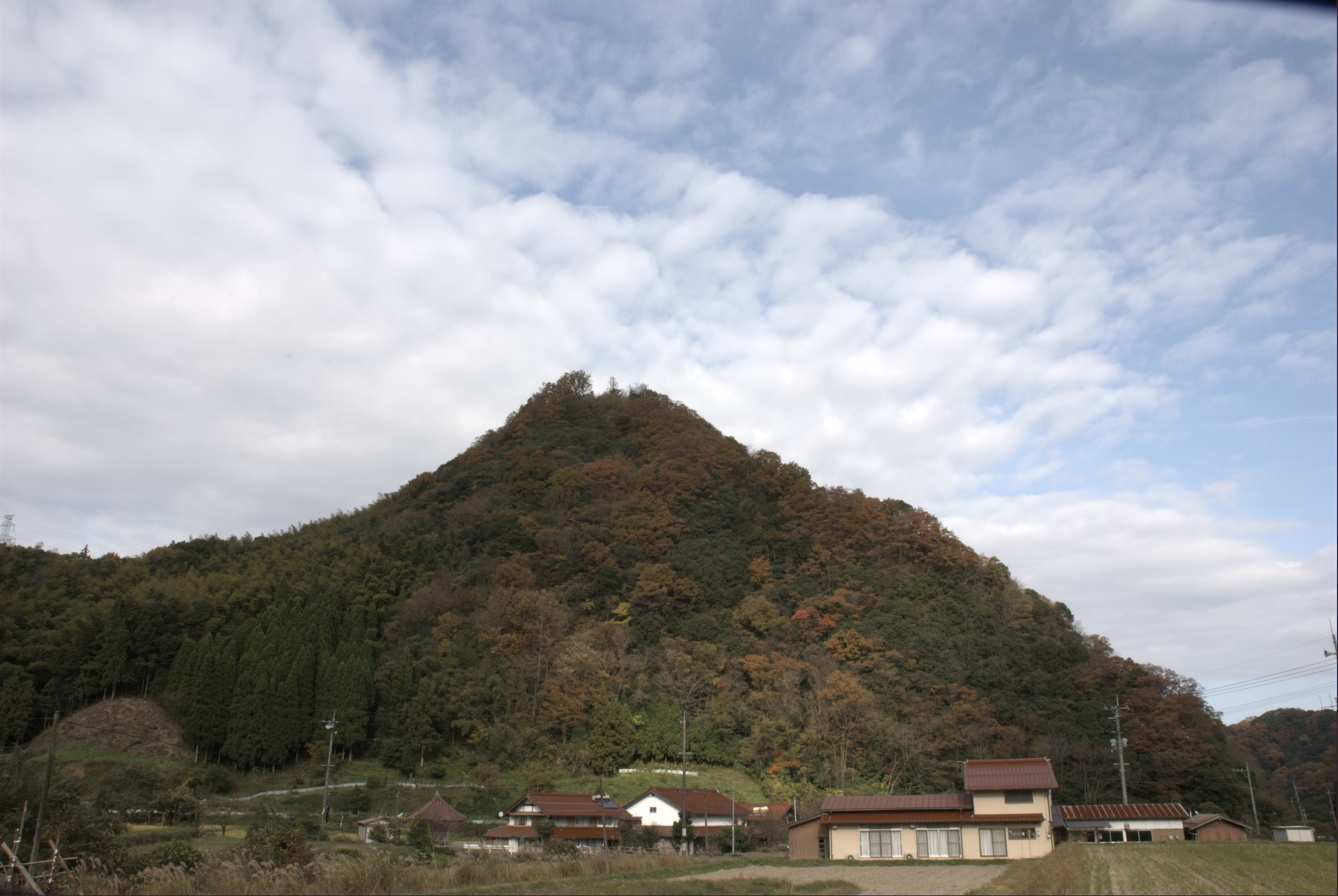
Kumano Castle

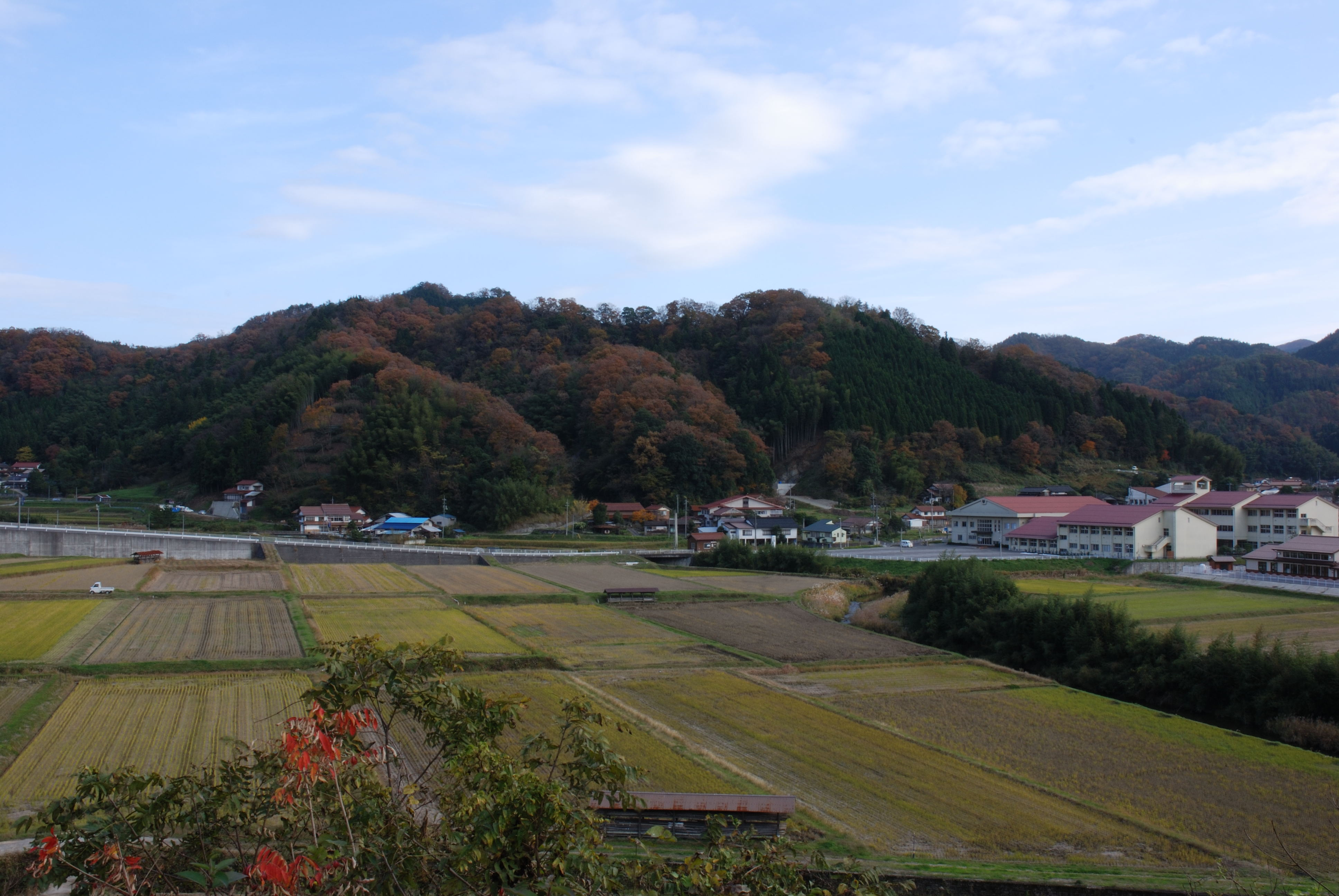
Ushio Castle

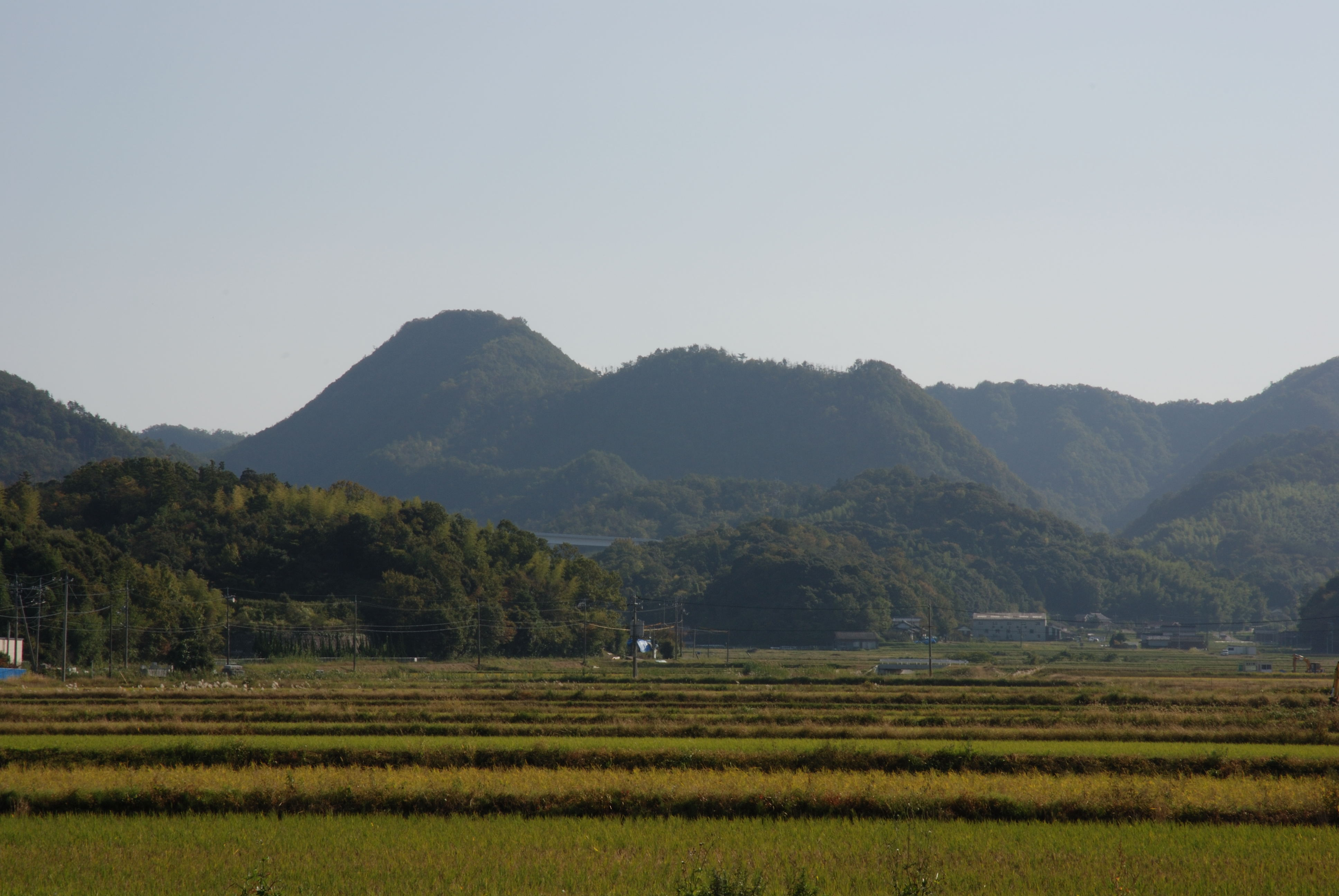
Takase Castle

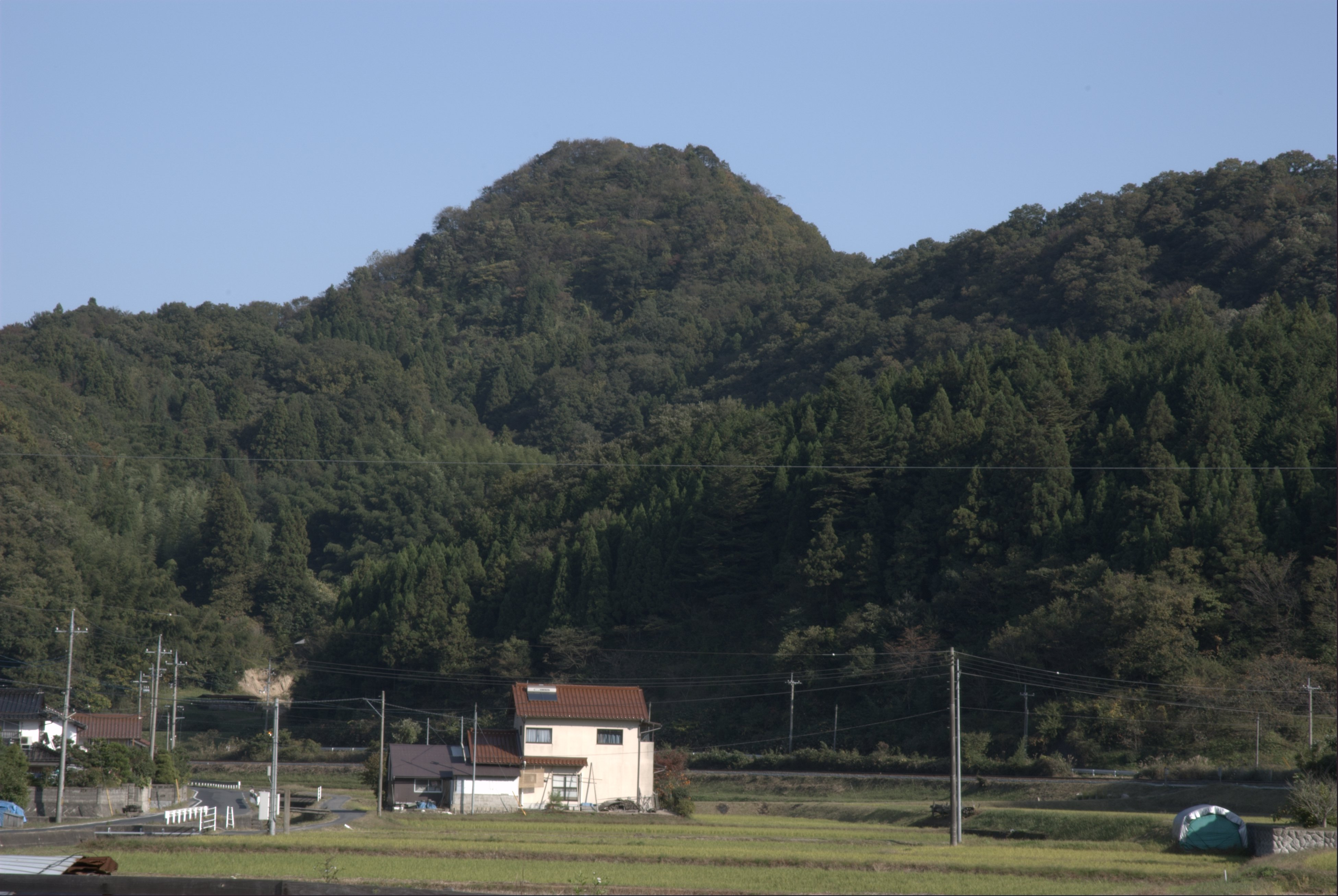
Daisai Castle

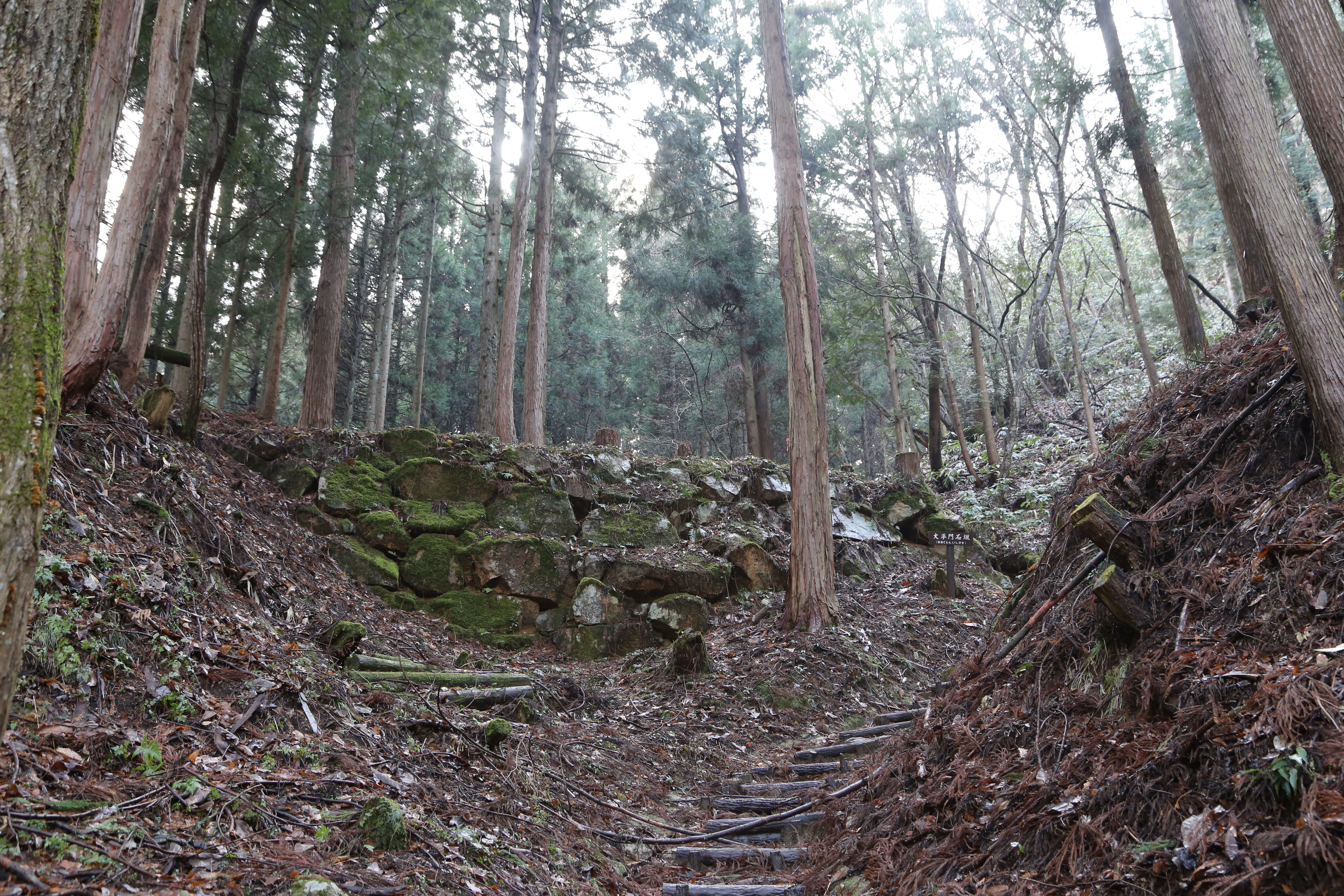
Stone wall of Mizawa Castle
