= Amori Station =

Railway station in Nagano, Nagano Prefecture, Japan

SE12 Amori Station 安茂里駅
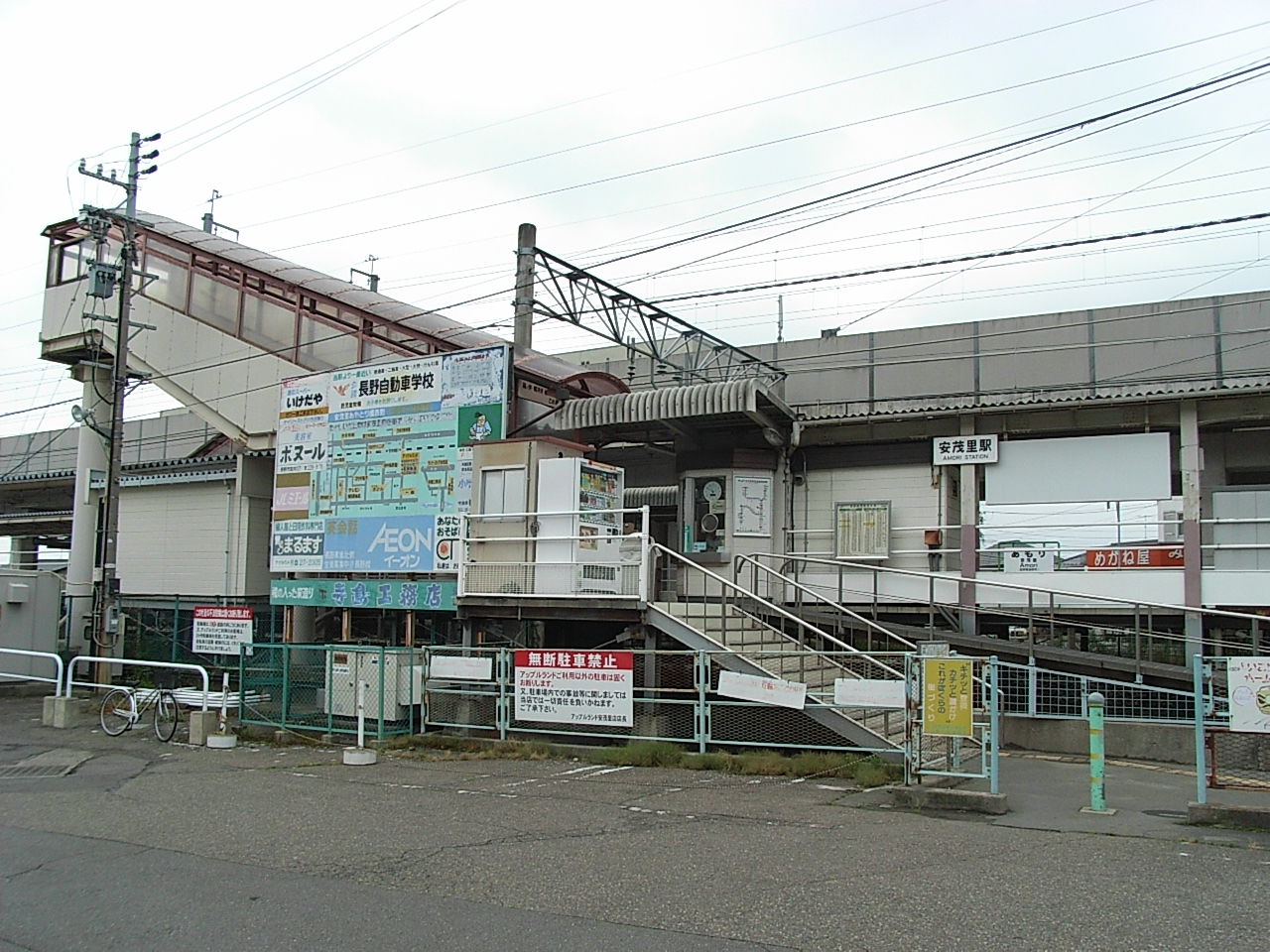
- Amori Station. June 2009

General information
- Location: 3580 Amori, Nagano-shi, Nagano-ken 380-0941; Japan
- Coordinates: 36.6301°N 138.1617°E
- Elevation: 360.3 meters
- Operator: JR East
- Line: ■ Shin'etsu Main Line
- Distance: 6.4 km from Shinonoi
- Platforms: 2 side platforms
- Tracks: 2

Other information
- Website: Official website

History
- Opened: 14 March 1985

Passengers
- FY2015: 1,059 (daily)

Services
Preceding station	JR East	Following station
Kawanakajima SE11 towards Shinonoi	Shin'etsu Main Line Shinonoi – Nagano	Nagano SE13 towards Niigata
Kawanakajima SE11 towards Shiojiri	Shinonoi Line Local & Rapid Misuzu	Nagano SE13 towards Shinonoi
Preceding station	Shinano Railway	Following station
Kawanakajima towards Karuizawa	Shinano Railway Line Local	Nagano Terminus
Location
- Location within Nagano Prefecture Location within Japan

Amori Station (安茂里駅, Amori-eki) is a railway station in the city of Nagano, Nagano Prefecture, Japan.

== Lines ==
Amori Station is served by the Shin'etsu Main Line and is 6.4 kilometers from the terminus of the line at Shinonoi Station. Shinanoi Line and Shinano Railway trains also stop at this station after continuing past the nominal terminus of these lines at Shinanoi en route to Matsumoto.

== Station layout ==
The station consists of two opposed elevated side platforms serving two tracks, with the station building underneath. The tracks are connected by a footbridge.

=== Platforms ===
1	■ Shin'etsu Main Line	for Nagano
2	■ Shin'etsu Main Line	for Shinonoi, Matsumoto and Shiojiri
	■ Shinonoi Line	for Shinonoi, Matsumoto and Shiojiri
	■ Shinano Railway Line	for Togura, Ueda and Komoro

== History ==
Amori Station opened on 14 March 1985. With the privatization of Japanese National Railways (JNR) on 1 April 1987, the station came under the control of JR East.

== Passenger statistics ==
In fiscal 2015, the station was used by an average of 1,059 passengers daily (boarding passengers only).

== Surrounding area ==
- National Route 19

== See also ==
- List of railway stations in Japan
