= Kunishi Motosuke =

Samurai

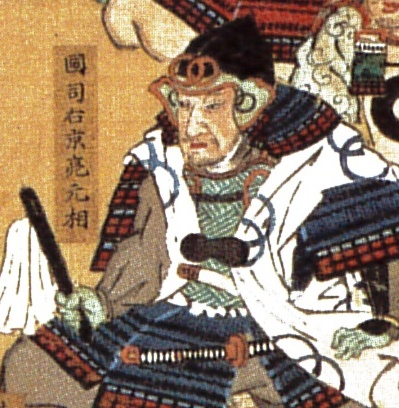
Kunishi Motosuke

Kunishi Motosuke (国司 元相; 1492 – February 11, 1592) was a Japanese Samurai of the 16th century, who served the Mōri clan. The son of Kunishi Arisuke, Motosuke served as a senior retainer of Mōri Takamoto. Motosuke fought with distinction at the Siege of Yoshida-Kōriyama Castle. Later, he was chosen as one of the five Bugyō of the Mōri clan.
