= Agon Shu =

Japanese new religion

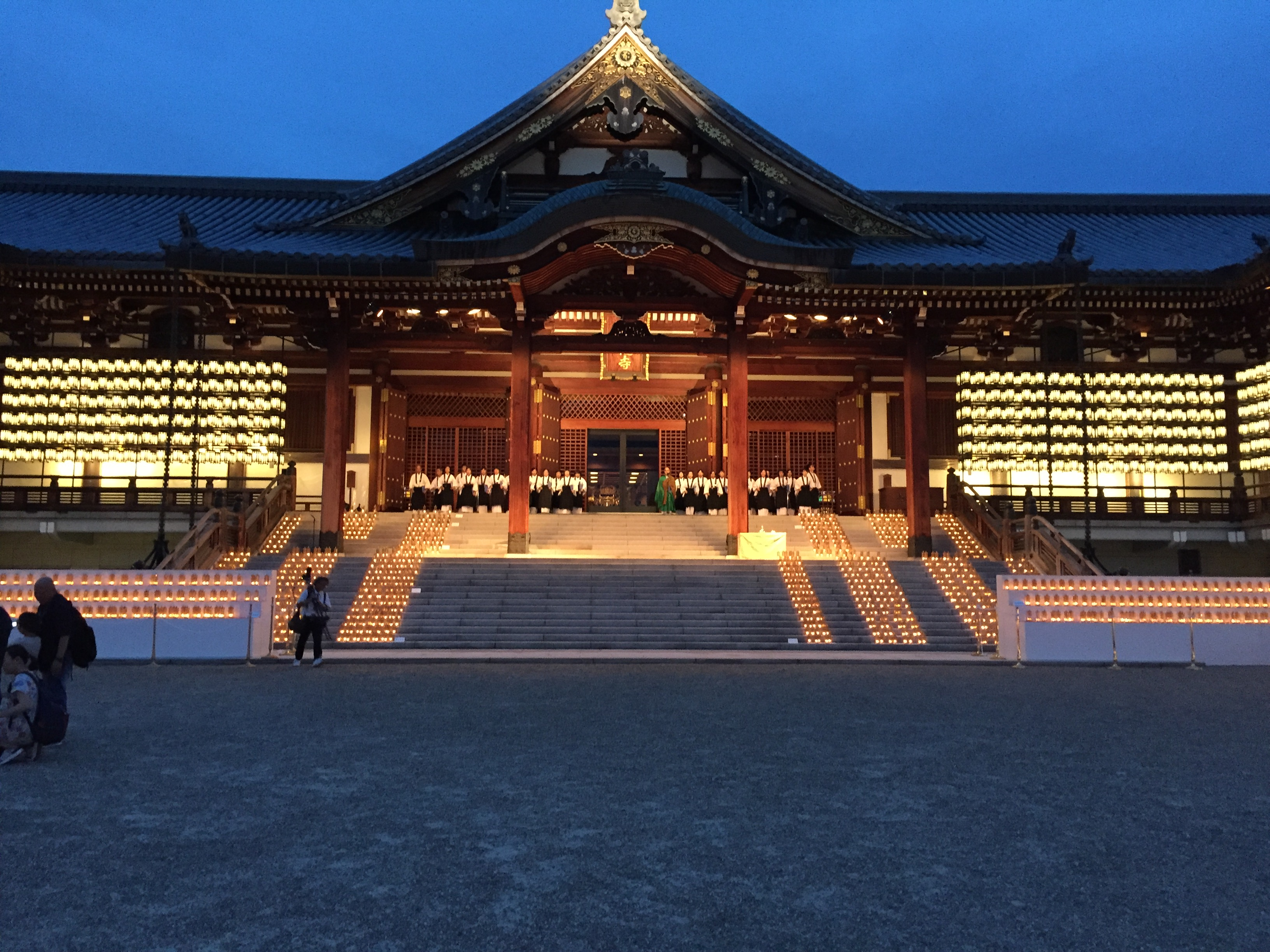
- Shakasan Daibodaiji Temple
- Formation: April 8, 1978
- Founder: Seiyu Kiriyama
- Type: Religious organization
- Legal status: Religious corporation
- Headquarters: Shakasan Daibodaiji Temple
- Location: Kitahanayama Omine-cho 17-5, Yamashina Ward, Kyoto City, Kyoto Prefecture
- Coordinates: 34°59′43″N 135°47′37.2″E
- Affiliations: Agon Shu Head Temple Religious Corporation
- Website: www.agon.org

Agon Shū (阿含宗) is a Japanese new religion in which the basic tenets are based on the Agamas, a collection of early Buddhist scriptures, which comprise the various recensions of the Sūtra Piṭaka. The organization was founded in 1954 by Kiriyama Seiyū (1921-2016) and was legally recognized in 1981; its headquarters are in Kyōto.

== Agon Shū and the Agama Pitaka ==
Agon Shū believes that, it takes its principles directly from the Buddha's teachings, which in the original Sanskrit language are called the Agamas or the Agama Sutras which literally means "the teaching of the Buddha". According to Agon Shū, these sutras are the true records of the teachings of Gautama Buddha, whereas Mahayana Buddhism is a deviation from the original teachings of the Buddha. In particular, members of Agon Shū claim that the Agamas contain the "Seven Systems and 37 practices for attaining Supreme Wisdom" taught by the Buddha to his disciples. The word Hinayana, meaning "Lesser Vehicle" is rejected as a derogatory term.

== Seiyū Kiriyama ==
The founder of Agon Shū is Seiyū Kiriyama (birth name: Masuo Tsutsumi) born in 1921 in Yokohama. His poor health prevented him from serving in the army, and he survived through several odd jobs. In 1953, he was accused of producing alcohol illegally and arrested. He prepared to commit suicide in jail but changed his mind at the last minute. Later, he attributed this to an intervention of the bodhisattva of compassion Juntei-Kannon, who entrusted him with a religious mission.

Claiming he was guided and directed by Kannon, he changed his name to Seiyū Kiriyama in 1955 and founded the Kannon Jikei-kai (観音慈恵会, Society of the Mercy of Kannon Bosatsu). He developed friendly relations with the Jōdo Shinshū Yōgen-in Temple in Kyoto, and established the headquarters of its society near the temple. In 1970, he claimed he had received a new revelation from Kannon, who told him that he should institute goma fire rituals to pacify the spirits of the dead and liberate the living from their bad karma. In 1978, Kiriyama announced the "discovery" that the Agamas are the keys to Buddha's teachings, and that Buddhist groups that do not recognize this mislead their followers. In 1980, Kiriyama visited the holy Buddhist site of Sahet Mahet in India and reported that the Buddha had appeared to him and passed to him the mantle of leader of universal Buddhism. These events led Kiriyama to establish and promote Agon Shū, founded in 1978, as a new global Buddhist movement and build a "new Sahet Mahet" in Yamashina-ku, Kyoto.

In 1986, Kiriyama received from the president of Sri Lanka, J. R. Jayewardene, what he believed was a true relic of Buddha. He claimed that most of the other relics of Buddha venerated in Japan were false, and that devotees should pray in their homes before a miniature version of the relic's casket venerated at Agon Shū's headquarters in Kyoto. The fame of the relic and fire rituals attracted many new devotees, and membership of Agon Shū grew to 500,000, thanks to the fact that Kiriyama was one of the first religious leaders in Japan to hire a public relations company, Dentsu, to help him spreading his message.

Meanwhile, Kiriyama devoted himself to the study of divination, the Lotus Sutra and Shingon Buddhism, and to writing several books. Agon Shū was among the first religious movements in Japan incorporating into its teachings the prophecies of Nostradamus. In 1989, Agon Shū had 1,358 priests, serving about 580,000 believers, some of them attending the movement's services via the Internet.

In 1995, the Tokyo subway sarin attack perpetrated by Aum Shinrikyo led to a hostile attitude in Japan towards new religious movements in general, and particularly affected Agon Shū when it became known that Aum Shinrikyo's founder, Shoko Asahara, had been for a short time a member of Kiriyama's movement. Scholars Ian Reader and Erica Baffelli, suggested that to dissociate himself from Asahara, Kiriyama in his later years emphasized Japanese nationalism and devoted several rituals to pacify the souls of Japanese soldiers who died during World War II.

== After Kiriyama's death ==
The same scholars, Reader and Baffelli, have studied what they believe is a transformation of Agon Shū after the death of Kiriyama in 2016 by his successors, senior priest Fukada Seia and chief female disciple Wada Naoko, into a cult of its founder, with Kiriyama's relics becoming increasingly more important than those of the Buddha, and with his messages from the spirit world received by some of the movement's leaders becoming normative sacred texts.
