= Ogōri, Yamaguchi =

Dissolved municipality in Yamaguchi prefecture, Japan

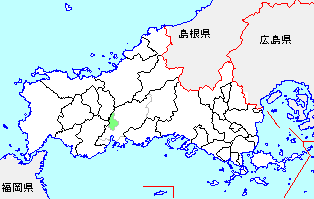
Ogōri in Yamaguchi Prefecture

Ogōri (小郡町, Ogōri-chō) was a town located in Yoshiki District, Yamaguchi Prefecture, Japan.

== Population ==
As of 2003, the town had an estimated population of 23,173 and a density of 693.80 persons per km^{2}. The total area was 33.40 km^{2}.

== Merge ==
On October 1, 2005, Ogōri, along with the town of Tokuji (from Saba District), and the towns of Aio and Ajisu (all from Yoshiki District), was merged into the expanded city of Yamaguchi.

== Transportation ==
Ogōri train station on the Sanyō Shinkansen, the San'yō Main Line and the Yamaguchi Line is now called Shin-Yamaguchi Station. The name change occurred on October 1, 2003, preceding the merger.
