= Arata Kochi =

Japanese physician and public health expert

Arata Kochi (古知 新, Kochi Arata, born 1948 or 1949) is a Japanese physician and public health expert, who is the former director of the World Health Organization's malaria program. He had previously been director of WHO's tuberculosis programs for ten years. While at WHO, Dr. Kochi became known for developing—and then forcefully promoting—often politically unpopular global public health interventions to fight tuberculosis, malaria and HIV/AIDS.

== Tuberculosis ==
Kochi is credited with promoting the Directly Observed Treatment Short course (DOTS) -the internationally recommended strategy for TB control that is recognized as a highly efficient and cost-effective strategy - for controlling TB as the most effective public health intervention of the decade, and after 1995 establishing more effective malaria control norms after 2005.

== Malaria ==
Kochi is pro-DDT.
