= Aio, Yamaguchi =

Dissolved municipality in Yamaguchi prefecture, Japan

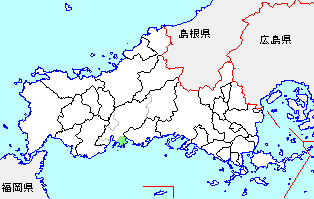
Aio in Yamaguchi Prefecture

Aio (秋穂町, Aio-chō) was a town located in Yoshiki District, Yamaguchi Prefecture, Japan.

As of 2003, the town had an estimated population of 7,801 and a density of 323.83 persons per km^{2}. The total area was 24.09 km^{2}.

On October 1, 2005, Aio, along with the town of Tokuji (from Saba District), and the towns of Ajisu and Ogōri (all from Yoshiki District), was merged into the expanded city of Yamaguchi.
