= Amoria =

Amoria may refer to:

== Biology ==
- Amoria (gastropod), a taxonomic genus of medium-sized predatory marine gastropod
- A synonym of the genus Trifolium (clovers)

== Other ==
- Amoria Neal-Tysor, basketball player on the 2021–22 Mercer Bears women's basketball team
- Oil Tanker Amoria, of the Iraqi Oil Tankers Company
- A schooner shipwrecked in Lake Pasteur, Quebec, Canada, in 1922
- A location in Dungeons & Dragons; see List of Dungeons & Dragons deities § Guardinal paragons
