= Uyama Hisakane =

Japanese samurai

Uyama Hisakane (宇山久兼) (died 1566) was a Japanese samurai of the Sengoku era who served the Amago clan. Hisakane was the son of Uyama Hisahide and served as a direct vassal to Amago Yoshihisa.
