= Akuma =

Akuma (悪魔; lit. devil, demon) may refer to:

== Fictional characters ==
- Akuma, the race that the members of the heavy metal band Seikima-II portray
- Akuma, the villain in Karateka (video game)
- Akuma, demonic army in D.Gray-man media
- Akuma, demon people in the Kindred of the East universe
- Akuma, leader of the Akki Monks in The Hollow (TV series)
- Akuma (Street Fighter), a character in Street Fighter media
- Akuma Shogun, the main villain of the Golden Mask Arc in Kinnikuman media
- Akuma-kun, a manga series by Shigeru Mizuki, and an animated TV series by Toei Animation
  - Akuma-kun: Makai no Wana, a video game based upon the above
- Akuma, a type of butterfly used to possess people in the animated series Miraculous: Tales of Ladybug & Cat Noir

== People ==
- Akuma (luchador), (born 1994), Mexican professional wrestler
- Gran Akuma (born 1979), American professional wrestler

== Other ==
- Akuma (folklore), an evil spirit from Japanese folklore
- Akuma (band), a punk band from Quebec, Canada
- Akuma no Ko, 2022 song by Ai Higuchi
- Acoma Pueblo, a location and tribe in New Mexico
