= Aomori (disambiguation) =

Aomori is a city in Japan. Aomori may also refer to:

== Places ==
- Aomori Prefecture, Japanese prefecture with the city of Aomori as its capital
  - Aomori Airport, airport in the prefecture
  - Aomori Station, station in the city

== Sports ==
- Aomori Wat's, a Japanese professional basketball team
- ReinMeer Aomori FC, a Japanese football (soccer) club based in Aomori, Japan
- Team Aomori, a women's curling team in Aomori, Japan

== Other ==
- Aomori (meteorite) a 1984 meteorite fall in Tohoku, Japan

== People with the surname ==
- Shin Aomori, Japanese voice actor
