= Amago Okihisa =

Amago Okihisa (尼子 興久; 1497–1534) was the third son of Tsunehisa. His childhood name was Hikoshirō (彦四郎). He also called himself En'ya Okihisa (塩冶 興久) for the domain he ruled.

He received Enya of east Izumo Province and used Mount Yōgai (要害山) for his castle. Like his elder brother Kunihisa, he was skilled in warfare. Not satisfied with the size of his domain, he demanded another 700 Kan in addition to 3000 Kan he already owned. He raised a revolt against Tsunehisa in 1532 suspecting Kamei Hidetsuna, the chief advisor to Tsunehisa had been plotting against him. The Amago clan split into two and Kamei Toshitsuna, Hidetsuna's younger brother died fighting for Okihisa. He was driven out of Enya and escaped. In 1534, he committed seppuku realizing that he would never be able to return to the clan.
