= Amago Haruhisa =

Japanese warlord

- 尼子 晴久
- Portrait at the Yamaguchi Prefectural Museum

Head of Amago clan
- In office 1538–1561
- Preceded by: Amago Tsunehisa
- Succeeded by: Amago Yoshihisa

Personal details
- Born: March 8, 1514 Izumo Province
- Died: January 9, 1561 (aged 46) Gassantoda Castle
- Parents: Amago Masahisa (尼子政久) (father); Yamada Yukimatsu's daughter (山名幸松女) (mother)
- Relatives: Amago Tsunehisa (grandfather); Amago Kunihisa (first cousin); Amago Katsuhisa (brother)
- Nickname(s): Saburoshirō (三郎四郎); Akihisa (詮久)

Military service
- Allegiance: Amago clan
- Rank: Daimyō (Lord)
- Unit: Amago clan
- Battles/wars: Hoki Campaign; Mimasaka Campaign; Inaba Campaign; Harima Campaign; Iwami Campaign; Siege of Yoshida-Kōriyama Castle (1540-1541); Siege of Gassantoda Castle (1542-1543)

Amago Haruhisa (尼子 晴久; March 8, 1514 – January 9, 1561) was a daimyō warlord in the Izumo Province, Chūgoku region of western Japan. He was the second son of Amago Masahisa. Initially named Akihisa (詮久), he changed his name to Haruhisa in 1541 after Ashikaga Yoshiharu offered to let him use a kanji character from his name.

== Biography ==
After his father Amago Masahisa died early in battle, Haruhisa became the head of Amago clan in 1537 after his grandfather stepped down. He launched a series of invasions to expand his domain, going as far as Harima. His childhood name was Saburōshirō (三郎四郎)

In 1540, the Siege of Yoshida-Kōriyama Castle against Mōri Motonari ended in a humiliating defeat, and many of his retainers defected believing that Haruhisa's days were numbered. His grandfather Amago Tsunehisa died the next year and Ōuchi Yoshitaka launched a counterattack to finish the Amago clan.

Amago Haruhisa successfully defended Toda castle in the 1542–43 Siege of Toda Castle. Haruhisa managed to stave off the invasion, encouraging those retainers who had defected earlier, and after gathering enough troops, managed to repel it. From this point, Haruhisa worked to secure his footing and control of such domains as Izumo, Hōki, Mimasaka, and Oki. When on 1551, Ōuchi Yoshitaka was killed by Sue Harukata's rebellion, in 1552, the Muromachi shogunate offered Haruhisa lordship over eight domains including those four domains he already fully controlled.

In his later years, Haruhisa suddenly decided to kill his uncle Amago Kunihisa as well as those retainers under him collectively called Shingūtō (新宮党) from the town Shingū which was their power base, resulting in a serious shortage of battle-proven leaders. While it was generally thought, largely from various fiction works that emphasize Mori Motonari's prowess, that this action was carried out by Motonari in order to weaken Haruhisa's power, it is now thought most likely that this was a move by Haruhisa himself to solidify control of the Amago clan.

When Sue Harutaka was defeated by Mori Motonari and died in the Battle of Miyajima, Haruhisa saw an opportunity to claim Iwami and making an alliance with Ogasawara clan of Iwami, moved to claim Omori Silver Mine. Motonari launched a counterattack and both clashed in a string of battles with no clear winner. Haruhisa collapsed in Gassantoda Castle in late 1560 while engaged in a battle against Motonari and died on 9 January 1561.

It is written in Unyo Gunjitsuki that Amago Hisayuki commented that Haruhisa was "Quick to act, lacking in the discipline of a general; quick to seek battle, lacking in forgiveness."

== Cultural References ==
Amago Haruhisa appears on Koei Tecmo games such as Nobunaga's Ambition and Samurai Warriors.

== Family ==
- Father: Amago Masahisa (1494-1518)
- Mother: Yamada Yukimatsu's daughter
- Wives:
  - daughter of Amago Kunihisa
  - unknown
- Children:
  - Matashiro
  - Amago Yoshihisa by daughter of Amago Kunihisa
  - Amago Tomohisa (1546-1623) by daughter of Amago Kunihisa (he was the father of Amago Motosato, 7th head of Amago Clan
  - Amago Hidehisa (d.1609) by daughter of Amago Kunihisa
  - Daughter
  - daughter married Misawa Tamekiyo

== See also ==
- Amago Siki(in Japanese) - A detailed site with a complete record of Amago clan.
