= Amago Yoshihisa =

Japanese daimyō

Amago Yoshihisa (尼子 義久; 1540 – October 14, 1610) was a daimyō (lord) of Izumo Province.

He was the eldest son of Haruhisa and he was given the childhood name of Saburōshirō (三郎四郎). After his father's sudden death in 1560, he became the head of the clan to continue the fight against the Mōri clan. While besieged in Gassantoda Castle, Yoshihisa had a retainer, Uyama Hisakane executed after fearing betrayal. This caused most of his remaining troops to desert and on 1566, he surrendered to Mōri Motonari. Yoshihisa was permitted to become a monk and was held captive at Enmeiji. As a monk, Yoshihisa changed his name to Yurin (友林). After Mōri Terumoto became the head of Mōri clan, he became a retainer under Terumoto.

== Family ==
- Father: Amago Haruhisa
- Mother: daughter of Amago Kunihisa
- Wife: daughter of Kyogoku clan
- Son: Amago Tomohisa
- Adopted son: Amago Motosato (1572–1622)
