= Amago Tsunehisa =

Japanese warlord (1458–1541)

- 尼子 経久
- Portrait at the Yamaguchi Prefectural Museum

Head of Amago clan
- In office 1477–1538
- Preceded by: Amago Kiyosada
- Succeeded by: Amago Haruhisa

Personal details
- Born: December 25, 1458 Izumo Province
- Died: November 30, 1541 (aged 82)
- Parents: Amago Kiyosada (尼子清定) (father); Maki Tomochika's daughter (真木朝親娘) (mother)
- Nickname(s): Matashirō (又四郎); Burial name: (興国院月叟省心大居士)

Military service
- Allegiance: Amago clan
- Rank: Daimyō (Lord)
- Unit: Amago clan
- Battles/wars: Siege of Yoshida-Kōriyama Castle (1540–1541)

Amago Tsunehisa (尼子 経久; December 25, 1458 – November 30, 1541) was a powerful warlord who gained the hegemony in Chūgoku region, Japan starting as a vassal of the Rokkaku clan. He ruled the domains of Inaba, Hōki, Izumo, Iwami, Oki, Harima, Mimasaka, Bizen, Bitchū, Bingo, and Aki.

Tsunehisa was the eldest son of Amago Kiyosada. His childhood name was Matashiro (又四郎). In 1473, he was already his father's deputy and dealt with the Rokkaku clan on taxation of goods passing through the Amago clan's domain. He became a deputy governor of Izumo province in 1477 and received a letter Kei (経) from Governor Kyogoku Masatsune, but was expelled by the Muromachi Ashikaga clan in 1484. He came back two years later taking the Rokkaku clan stronghold of Tomidajo with less than one hundred of his troops. He gained full control of Izumo in 1508 by successfully subjugating powerful regional clans, called kokujin.

When Ōuchi Yoshioki marched upon Kyoto in 1508 in support of Ashikaga Yoshitada, Tsunehisa took advantage of Yoshioki's distraction and secretly communicated with kokujin all over the Chūgoku region to counter the powerful Ōuchi clan. He lost his eldest son and heir apparent Amago Masahisa in 1513 battling Sakurai Masamune but finally succeeded in controlling 11 domains by the 1520s. Samurai in Iwami and Aki were forced to walk a tightrope between Amago and Ōuchi. Mōri Motonari, who would eventually emerge victorious against both Amago and Ōuchi, was one such samurai.

Tsunehisa's late years were troubled by constant internal troubles. In 1532, at the age of 74, he was forced to crush a revolt by his third son Amago Okihisa and was left without an heir. In 1538, he handed over the Amago clan to his grandson Amago Haruhisa and three years later, Tsunehisa died from illness, fearing young Haruhisa might be too inexperienced. Tsunehisa's burial name is "興国院月叟省心大居士" and he is buried in Dokoji of Shimane prefecture.

== Family ==
- Father: Amago Kiyosada
- Mother: Maki Tomochika's daughter
- Wife: Yoshiawa-dono
- Children:
  - Amago Masahisa (1494–1518) by Yoshiawa
  - Amago Kunihisa
  - Amago Okihisa by Yoshiawa-dono
  - Ito married to Kitajima family
  - daughter married to Senge family
  - daughter married Shinji Hisayoshi
  - Take-do Toshikata Dai-sho
