= Ajisu, Yamaguchi =

Dissolved municipality in Yamaguchi prefecture, Japan

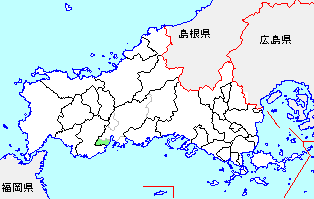
Map of Ajisu, Yamaguchi

Ajisu (阿知須町, Ajisu-chō) was a town located in Yoshiki District, Yamaguchi Prefecture, Japan.

As of 2003, the town had an estimated population of 8,926 and a density of 350.18 persons per km^{2}. The total area was 25.49 km^{2}.

On October 1, 2005, Ajisu, along with the town of Tokuji (from Saba District), and the towns of Aio and Ogōri (all from Yoshiki District), was merged into the expanded city of Yamaguchi.
