= Amago Kunihisa =

- Born: 1492
- Died: November 25, 1554 (aged 61–62)
- Spouse: Daughter of Tako Tadashige
- Relatives: Amago Tsunehisa (father); Amago Sanehisa (son); Amago Toyohisa (son); Amago Takahisa (son)
- Military career
- Allegiance: Amago family
- Rank: Daimyo (Lord)
- Conflicts: Siege of Koriyama Castle; Battle of Hashizugawa; Many others

Amago Kunihisa (尼子 国久; 1492 – November 25, 1554) was a Japanese warlord during the Sengoku period of western Honshu. He was a son of Amago Tsunehisa.

A principle Amako general under Tsunehisa, he led a force that came to be nicknamed the "Shingū army". Kunihisa's faction was named Shingūtō (新宮党) after the town, Shingū, which was based in a valley north-east of Gassan-Toda where Kunihisa built his residence. Under his father, he fought in campaigns in Aki and Bingo provinces during the 1520s and alongside Amago Haruhisa at the Siege of Koriyama Castle in 1540. In 1544 he defeated a Mōri army but lost his second son, Toyohisa, at the bitterly fought Battle of Hashizugawa in 1546 against Takeda Kuninobu of Inaba Province.

After Amago Masahisa was killed in 1518 Kunihisa acted as a guardian for the former's son, Amako Haruhisa (Akihisa). He had been called "On the military matters, he is like a kami and an oni" from his father, Tsunehisa. But he often looked down on those who did not do well on the battlefield and was obnoxious from time to time.

In spite of his many services to the Amako clan, Kunihisa came to be distrusted by Haruhisa, his nephew and the daimyō after Tsunehisa's death. One possible reason for Haruhisa's hostility towards Kunihisa and his Shingu faction is that they displayed increasing arrogance as their fame from their war service grew.

In 1554, Kunihisa was killed by Amago Haruhisa on the suspicion of treason on 25 November 1554 along with his eldest son Sanehisa and two grandsons, including a number of his retainers. His third son Takehisa would commit suicide the next day. The act was supposedly carried out after Mōri Motonari tricked Haruhisa into believing that Kunihisa intended to take over the Amago clan but one of the reasons may be that Kunihisa had been too arrogant towards the young Haruhisa.

Regardless of the motive for the act, the death of Kunihisa and the purge of his faction significantly damaged the Amago clan and arguably contributed towards the clan's fall to their rival, the Mōri clan, in the 1570s.

== See also ==
- History of Japan
- List of Japanese battles
