= Azumino (disambiguation) =

Azumino (安曇野市, Azumino-shi) is a city in Nagano Prefecture, Japan.

Azumino may also refer to :

- Azumi Basin (安曇野, Azumino), part of the Matsumoto Basin in Nagano Prefecture, Japan
- Azumino (安曇野), a 1974 work by Japanese author Yoshimi Usui
