= Jōkyō uprising =

1686 peasant uprising in Japan

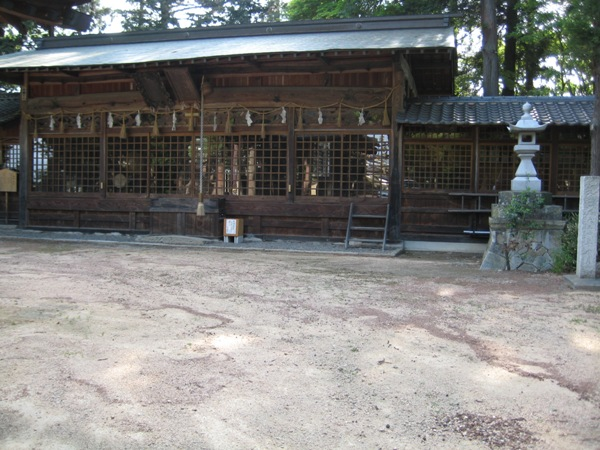
- Kumano shrine, the site of the farmers' secret meetings
- Native name: 貞享騒動
- Date: 1686
- Location: Azumidaira, Japan
- Type: Large-scale peasant uprising
- Cause: Heavy tax rises
- Deaths: 28

The Jōkyō uprising (貞享騒動, Jōkyō Sōdō), or the Kasuke uprising, was a large-scale peasant uprising that happened in 1686 (in the third year of the Jōkyō era during the Edo period) in Azumidaira, Japan. Azumidaira at that time, was a part of the Matsumoto Domain under the control of the Tokugawa shogunate. The domain was ruled by the Mizuno clan at the time.

Numerous incidents of peasant uprising have been recorded in the Edo period, and in many cases the leaders of the uprisings were executed afterward. Those executed leaders have been admired as Gimin, non-religious martyrs, with the most famous Gimin being the possibly fictitious Sakura Sōgorō. But the Jōkyō Uprising was unique in that not only the leaders of the uprising (former or incumbent village heads, who did not personally suffer from the heavy taxes), but also a sixteen-year-old girl (subject of the book Oshyun by Ohtsubo Kazuko) who had helped her father, "the deputy ringleader", were caught and executed. On top of that, the leaders of the uprising clearly recognized what was at stake. They realized that the real issue was abuse of rights within a feudal system. Because the newly raised tax level was equivalent to a 70% tax rate; an impossible rate. The Mizunos compiled Shimpu-tōki, an official record of the Matsumoto Domain about forty years after the uprising. This Shimpu-tōki is the major and credible source of information concerning the uprising.

== Background ==
For several years there had been crop failure caused by severe winters. Azumidaira farmers had suffered from this and many people had starved to death. Poverty was rampant. Under the circumstances some households had to sell their daughters to brothels, and others had to kill newborn babies. Some village heads like Tada Kasuke and Oana Zembei tried to relieve the farmers' suffering by giving away rice from their own storehouses. But their acts of righteousness were met with a harsh reprimand from officials in Matsumoto. Tada Kasuke was fired as the headman of Nakagaya village, and Oana Zembei was fired as the headman of Niré village. Then in the fall of 1686, the domain government raised taxes to an exorbitant level. (The domain lord who was away from home at the time was obviously not informed of the tax rise.) The reason for this tax rise was that the domain government needed more money. The domain lord of Matsumoto was a fudai daimyō, who was obligated to perform many duties, and therefore had to spend a lot of money. The domain lords of neighboring Takatō and Takashima were not under such pressure to perform such duties, even though they used to be a part of the Matsumoto Domain. They collected lower taxes from their people. When Azumidaira farmers were notified of the tax rise, the atmosphere among tax collectors and peasants became tense, for their neighbors didn't have to pay the same amount of taxes.

== Event ==
=== Secret meetings ===
In October 1686, Tada Kasuke summoned a dozen trustworthy farmers to a secret meeting held at a local Kumano Shrine. The sacred place was an appropriate venue for discussing the issue of peasant survival. After a series of such meetings, Tada Kasuke and his followers came to the conclusion that appealing to the magistrate’s office in Matsumoto was inevitable. They decided to do so even though they knew that to appeal was forbidden. Married men divorced their wives and sent them back to their parents’ homes. They then prepared a letter of appeal of five articles. In the letter they humbly asked for a tax reduction. The five points of the letter of appeal were :

1. Rendering rice tax after processing is too much of a burden.

2. We ask for a reduction of rice tax to the level of those of two neighboring domains.

3. Concerning the part of rice tax collected in the form of soy-beans, half of which is collected in cash; We ask that the tax money be calculated based on the price of rice, not on the price of soy-beans.

4. Concerning the obligation of transportation of rice, we ask that the obligation be reduced to transporting it only as far as the domain limits.

5. Concerning the personnel cost of local and Edo offices, which we are obligated to shoulder, we ask that the obligation be cancelled.

=== Appeal to the Magistrate's Office ===
Early on the morning of October 14, Tada Kasuke and Oana Zembei, along with their followers, went to the magistrate’s office outside Matsumoto Castle, and handed in the letter of appeal. What they had not expected was that a huge crowd of farmers would gather and intimidate the officials. Kasuke and his followers had started this out as a peaceful mission. (There is a scholar who refutes this generally accepted notion. He claims that the leaders had intended to mobilize people from the outset. But in the process of dramatizing the story of the executed farmers who would later be revered as Gimin, their initial intention was changed into a more peaceful one.) But when word spread that they were appealing, thousands of peasants flocked to the castle, some of whom stormed shops and the castle gate. The domain lord, Mizuno Tadanao, was away in Edo for sankin-kōtai (alternate-year attendance) at the time, so the executives had to deal with the situation themselves. Their biggest concern was how much this incident would negatively affect the position of the Matsumoto Domain. Thousands of farmers were camping out in the cold outside the castle. On the night of October 16, the domain government issued a response paper signed by two magistrates. When the news of the response paper spread, the majority of peasants who had gathered around Matsumoto Castle went home. But Kasuke and his followers were not satisfied with the response. They lingered behind. They were so determined to get a satisfactory answer that they stayed two more nights outside the castle. At last five executives signed the second response paper responding favorably to the farmers' appeal. The documents granted the farmers’ wishes to decrease the tax. Kasuke went home along with his followers. On October 18, the incident was settled peacefully.

=== Evasive tactic ===
However, it turned out that the response documents signed by the executives were a tactic used to settle the rebellion. Under the strict Tokugawa administration, domain government's failure to control an uprising meant dethronement for the domain lord. The executives of the Matsumoto Domain who were in charge of the incident needed to suppress it by all means.

A month later, Kasuke and other leaders of the uprising were arrested. The response documents were confiscated. Kasuke and his followers along with the male members of their families were executed without trial. (Kasuke's twelve-year-old first-born son, ten-year-old second-born son, and a mere five-year-old son of one of Kasuke's followers were executed, though they did not take part in the uprising.) Oana Zembei's daughter, Oshyun was responsible for delivering invitations to secret meetings at the Kumano Shrine. She was also executed (since women were not supposed to be executed for such a crime in feudal times, her name was changed to a masculine name in the official record, Shimpu-tōki). Twenty-eight farmers were executed in all. The executions took place on January 5, 1687 at two separate locations. One execution site was at Seitaka (a temporary site) and the other was at Idegawa. Seventeen farmers from the north of the castle were taken to Seitaka. Kasuke, Zembei, and Oshyun were among them. Eleven farmers from the south of the castle were taken to Idegawa. (In addition to the November executions, the new-born son of Oana Zembei's widow, Osato, was sentenced to death. But the baby died of an unexplained illness within a few weeks after birth.)

Kasuke is said to have shouted out for lowered taxes when he was tied to the execution pole. Matsumoto Castle had been built with a structural defect which caused it to lean, rumored to be due to Tada Kasuke's passionate outcry. But the rumor started in the Meiji period when the castle tower actually started to lean to one side.)

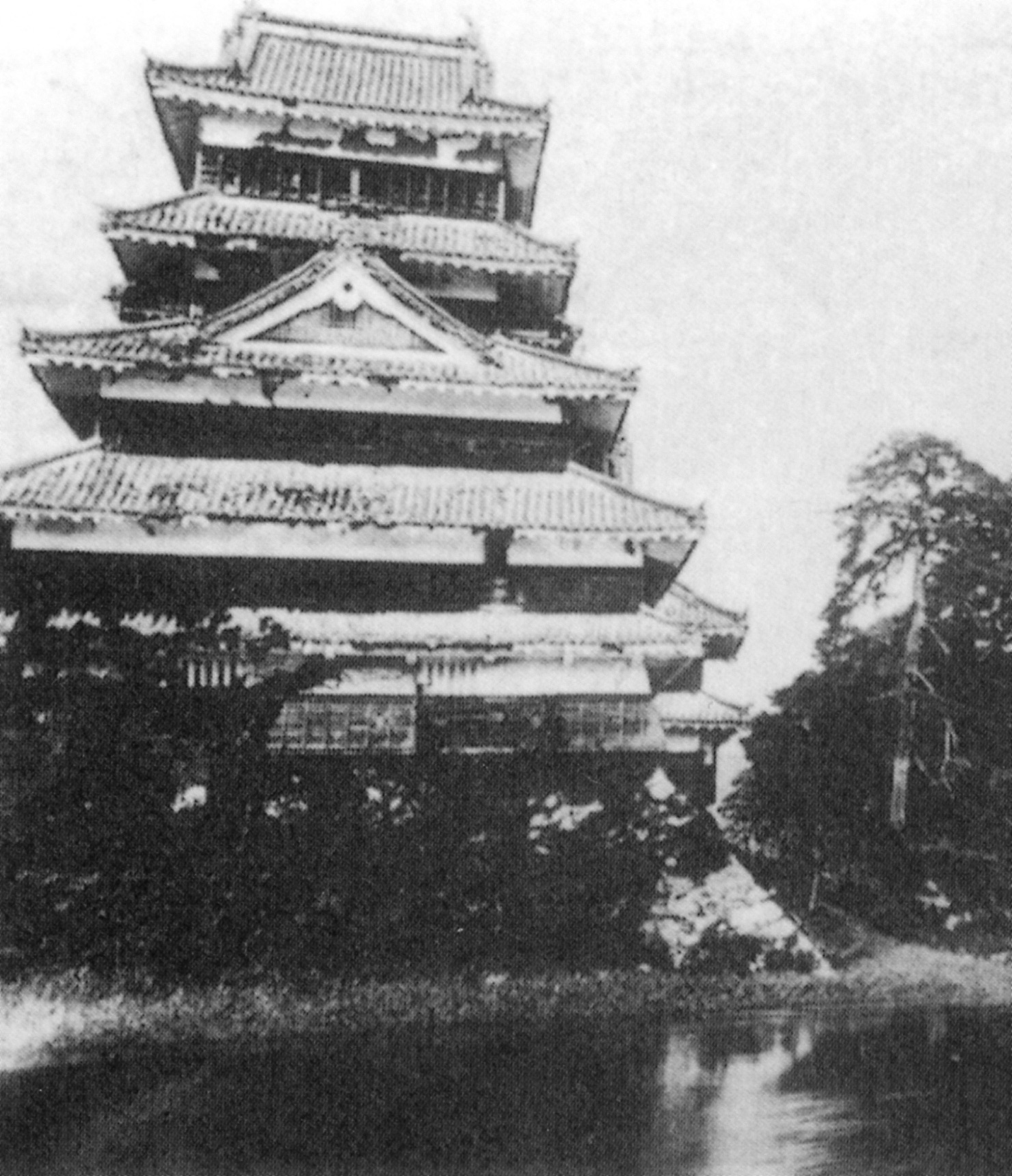
The keep, leaning to one side (Archive of the Matsumoto Castle Management Bureau)

== Influence ==
The uprising has been perceived as a struggle for the right to life, and thought to be a forerunner for the Jiyū Minken Undo (Freedom and People's Rights Movement in the Meiji period). This movement swept across the nation in the 1870s and 1880s. The bicentennial anniversary of the Jōkyō Uprising was observed in an atmosphere of excitement over the movement. Matsuzawa Kyūsaku, a newspaper journalist from Azumidaira, wrote a play based on the uprising, giving it a title Minken Kagami Kasuke no Omokage (The Image of Kasuke, a Model of the People's Rights Movement). Incidentally, Matsuzawa died in prison exactly 200 years after Kasuke and others had been executed.

== Gimin-zuka burial mound ==
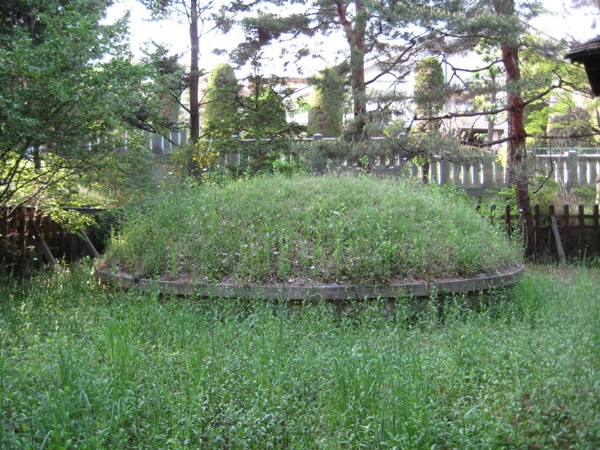
The burial mound of the executed farmers

In 1950, at a construction site near Seitaka shrine in Matsumoto City, a human body was found. In the next few weeks, additional bodies were found. The number of the unearthed bodies came to eighteen. Seventeen bodies were clustered, and one was found apart from the rest. Four of the seventeen bodies were headless, which coincides with the story handed down by tradition. And one of the seventeen clustered bodies had a larger pelvis and slender bones. Taking these into consideration, historical and medical researchers of the time concluded that it was highly possible that the seventeen clustered bodies were those of the executed farmers of the Jōkyō Uprising. (The one with a larger pelvis must be Oshyun's body. Oana Zembei's body was also easily identified by its long bones, because he had been known for being tall.) In 1952, the bodies were buried in a mound, and the mound has been called Gimin-zuka. Every year on the anniversary day of the executions of the Gimin, a memorial service is held in front of the mound.

Then questions arise as to the whereabouts of the bodies of the farmers who had been executed at Idegawa execution site. It is widely believed that the eleven bodies have been washed away by river water, for the execution site was on the bank of the Tagawa river. When Gimin-zuka was built, some soil from the former Idegawa execution site was used in the construction.

== Jōkyō Gimin Memorial Museum ==
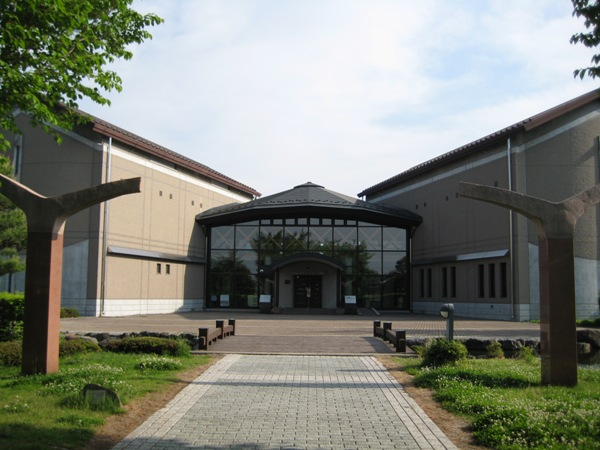
Front view of the Jōkyō Gimin Memorial Museum

After the 300th anniversary of the uprising, Azumino people founded in 1992 a memorial museum in honor of the uprising. The museum, Jōkyō Gimin Memorial Museum, has a plaque with the inscription of the first article of the Universal Declaration of Human Rights, and another plaque with the inscription of the 11th and 12th articles of the Constitution of Japan, in both English and Japanese. They stand on each side of the main entrance to the building. The museum is located right across the street from the former Tada family homestead (designated as a cultural asset of Nagano Prefecture in 1960).
