= Sakura Sōgorō =

Legendary Japanese farmer

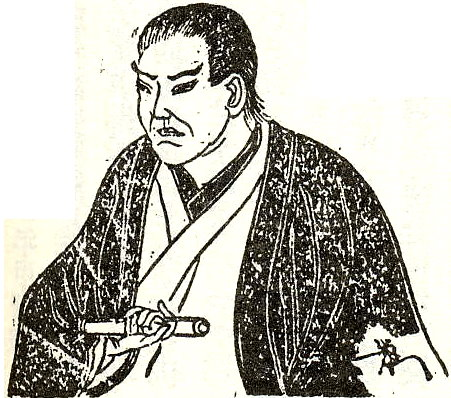
- Born: Kiuchi Sōgorō; 1605; Shimōsa Province
- Died: September 1653 (aged 47–48); Kodzu Village
- Monuments: Jōkyō Gimin Memorial Museum
- Occupation: Agriculture
- Era: Edo period; Tokugawa shogunate
- Criminal charges: Civil disobedience to feudal Japanese military government's Tokugawa Ietsuna; Conspiring with Yui Shōsetsu; Petition of excessive taxation
- Criminal penalty: Parents death by crucifixion; Children death by decapitation
- Spouse: Tsuta
- Children: Sohei; Gennosuké; Kihachi; Sannosuké

Kiuchi Sōgorō (木内 惣五郎), also known as Sakura Sōgo(rō) (佐倉 惣五（郎）; Japanese pronunciation: [sä́.kɯ̈̀.ɾä̀ | ꜜsó̞ò̞.ɡò̞(.ɾò̞ò̞), sä̀.kɯ̈́.ɾä́ só̞ò̞-, -ŋò̞(.ɾò̞ò̞)], 1605 – September 1653) was a legendary Japanese farmer whose real family name was Kiuchi. He is said to have appealed directly to the shōgun in 1652 when he was serving as a headman of one of the villages in the Sakura Domain. In the appeal he requested the shōgun to help ease the peasants' burden of heavy taxes and bad crops. But since direct appeals were illegal in those days, he was arrested. It is widely believed that he was executed (crucified) along with his sons (and some sources claim also his wife) in 1653 by the daimyō of his feudal domain. However, no evidence for the existence of the incident has been found, although a farmer named Sōgorō was found listed on the record of the village. The legend of Sakura Sōgorō has been made into numerous stories and plays of kabuki, Jōruri, and so on (a.o. a play called "Self-Sacrificing Man Sakura Sōgo"). In 1851 the play was first staged at Nakamura-za. He is enshrined in Sōgo-reidō of Tōshōji temple in Narita city. He was praised by Fukuzawa Yukichi and in the Freedom and People's Rights Movement and is still admired by many as gimin (martyr, in the non-religious sense). Every year on 2 September (it is said that it is the day before his execution, but other sources say he was executed on the 24th), there are all-night gatherings in memory of Sōgo-sama at the Sōgo Reidō Sanctuary (Tōshōji Temple) in Narita (Chiba prefecture).

== Media ==
In Persona 5, the character Sojiro Sakura's name was inspired by Sōgorō.

== See also ==
Bakumatsu	Rōjū
Edo society	Sakoku
Emperor Go-Kōmyō	Tada Kasuke
Fukagawa Edo Museum	Tales of Old Japan
History of Japan	The Tokaido Road (1991)
Hotta Masatoshi	Tokugawa clan
Martyrs of Japan	Tozama daimyō

Japanese Castles of Edo Period

Edo Castle	Matsumoto Castle
Hirosaki Castle	Nagoya Castle
Maruoka Castle	Sakura Castle

== Bibliography ==
- Ogyū, Sorai (2006). Ogyū Sorai's Philosophical Masterworks. University of Hawaii Press. p. 101. ISBN 978-0824829513. OCLC 61687854.
- Brandon, James R.; Leiter, Samuel L. (2002). Kabuki Plays on Stage: Darkness and Desire, 1804-1864 [The Tale of the Martyr of Sakura (Sakura Giminden)]. University of Hawaii Press. pp. 221–247. ISBN 978-0824824556. OCLC 51069986.
- Hosaka, Satoru (2002). Hyakushō Ikki to Sono Sahō (in Japanese). Tokyo: Yoshikawa Kōbunkan. ISBN 4-642-05537-1. OCLC 49803777.
- Walthall, Anne (1991). Peasant Uprisings in Japan: A Critical Anthology of Peasant Histories [The Sakura Sogoro Story]. University of Chicago Press. pp. 35–75. ISBN 978-0226872339. OCLC 23213000.
- Irokawa, Daikichi (1988). The Culture of the Meiji Period. Princeton University Press. pp. 133–135. ISBN 978-0691000305. OCLC 11291445.
- Walthall, Anne (1986). "Japanese Gimin: Peasant Martyrs in Popular Memory". The American Historical Review. 91 (5). Oxford University Press: 1076–1102. doi:10.2307/1864377. JSTOR 1864377.
- Hayashi, Tadasu (1903). "For his People, being the True Story of Sogoro's Sacrifice entitled in the Original Japanese Version the Cherry Blossoms of a Spring Morn". Internet Archive. New York, New York: Harper & Brothers.
- Knapp, Arthur May (1900). "Feudal and Modern Japan". Internet Archive. Boston, Massachusetts: L.C. Page. OCLC 2768695.
- Braithwaite, George (1897). "Life of Sôgorô, the Farmer Patriot of Sakura". Internet Archive. Yokohama, Japan: Yokohama Bunsha. OCLC 503765496.
- Jokô III, Segawa; Shinshichi II, Kawatake (1851). "Higashiyama Sakura Sôshi" [Higashiyama Sakura Zôshi]. Sakura Giminden. Kabuki21.com.
