= Kita-Matsumoto Station =

Railway station in Matsumoto, Nagano Prefecture, Japan

Ōito Line41 Kita-Matsumoto Station 北松本駅
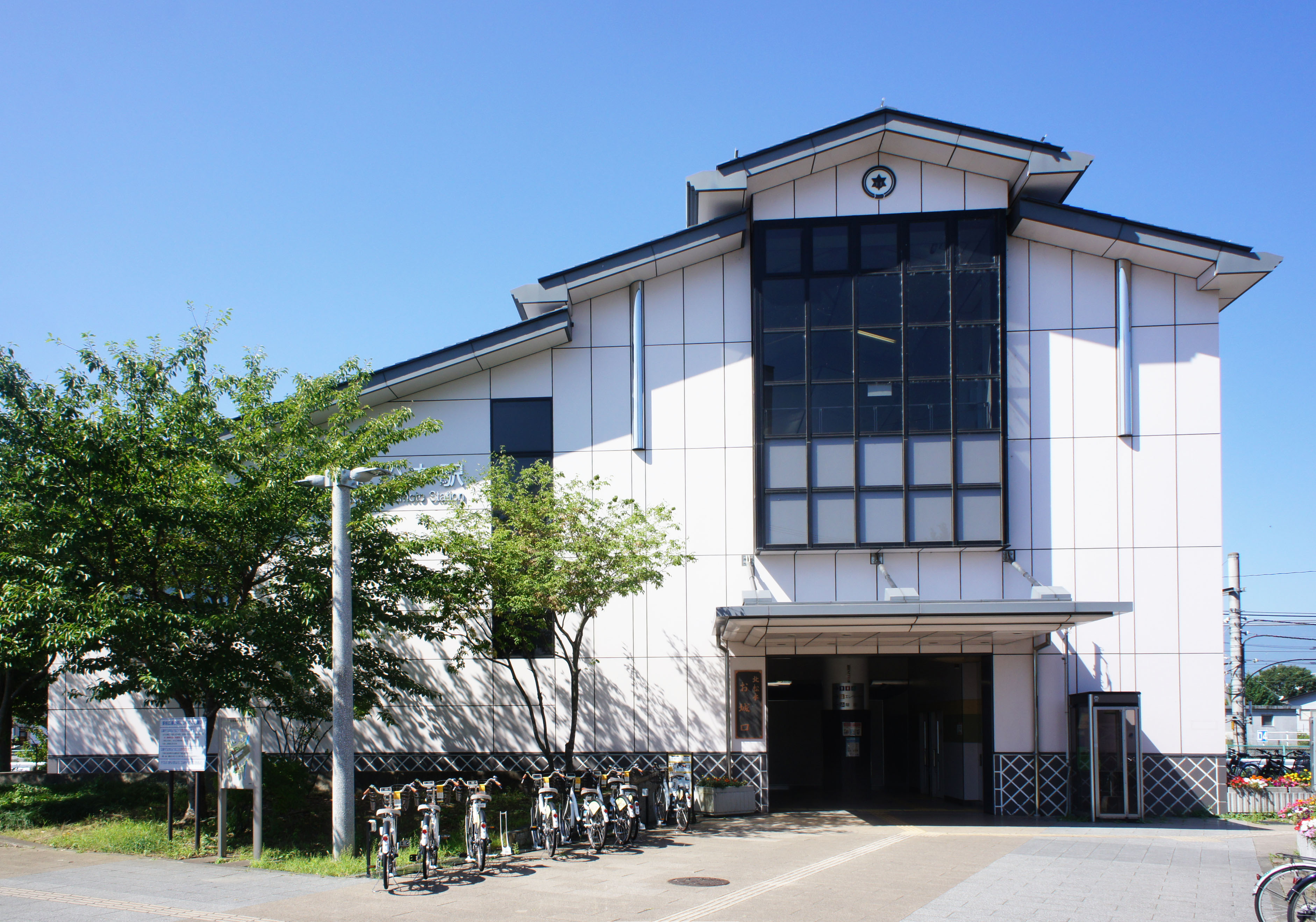
- Kita-Matsumoto Station, August 2021

General information
- Location: Shiraita 1-chome, Matsumoto-shi, Nagano-ken 390-0863; Japan
- Coordinates: 36.2368°N 137.9608°E
- Elevation: 583.2 meters
- Operator: JR East
- Line: ■ Ōito Line
- Distance: 0.7 km from Matsumoto
- Platforms: 1 Island platform

Other information
- Status: Staffed
- Station code: 41
- Website: Official website

History
- Opened: 6 January 1915
- Former names: Matsumoto Station (to April 1915)

Passengers
- FY2015: 756

Services
Preceding station	JR East	Following station
Shimauchi One-way operation	Ōito Line Rapid	Matsumoto 42 Terminus
Shimauchi 40 towards Minami-Otari	Ōito Line Local	Matsumoto 42 Terminus
Location
- Location within Nagano Prefecture Location within Japan

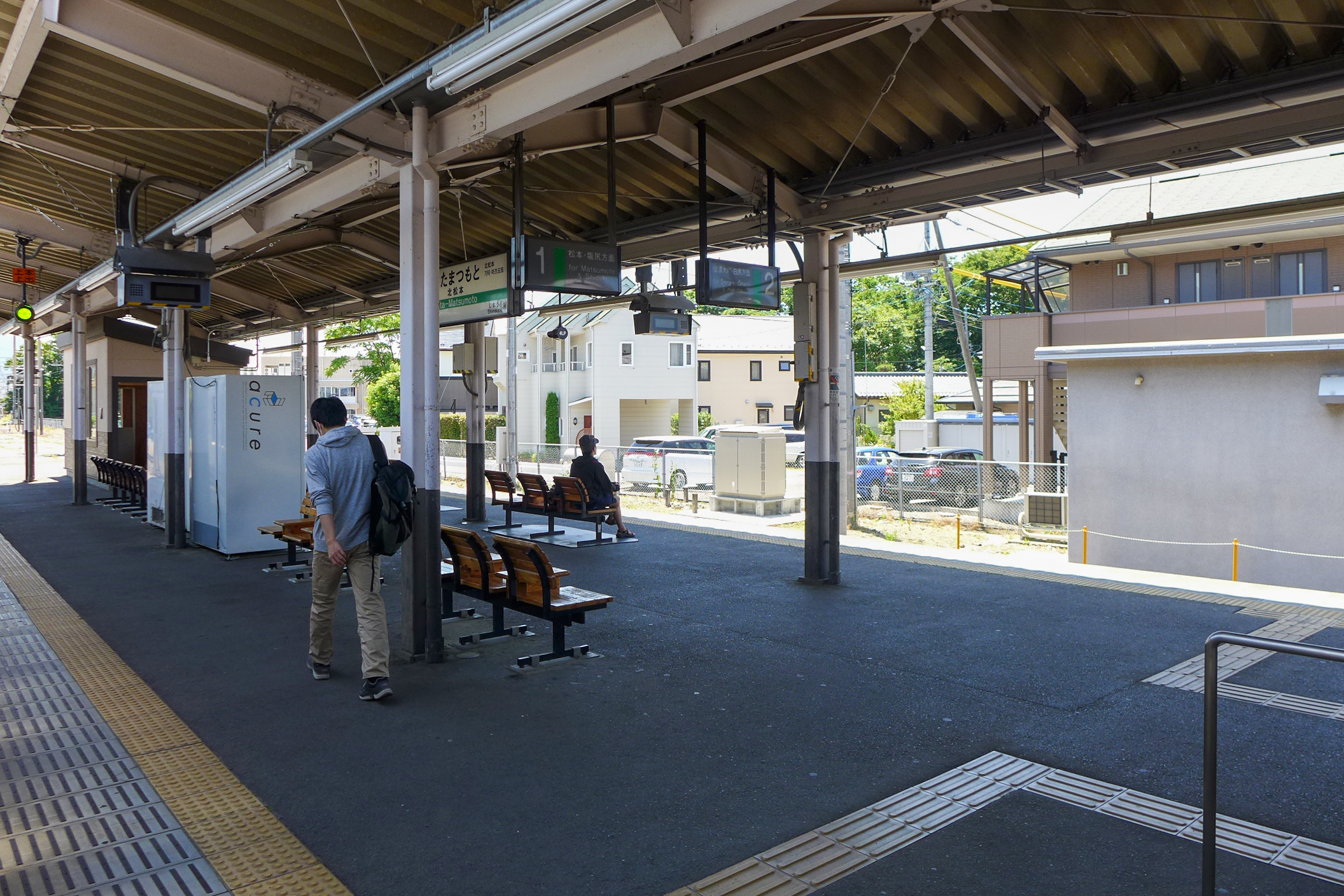
Platform

Kita-Matsumoto Station (北松本駅, Kita-Matsumoto-eki) is a train station in the city of Matsumoto, Nagano Prefecture, Japan, operated by East Japan Railway Company (JR East).

== Lines ==
Kita-Matsumoto Station is served by the Ōito Line and is 0.7 kilometers from the terminus of the line at Matsumoto Station.

== Station layout ==
The station consists of one ground-level island platform, connected by an elevated station building. The station is a Kan'i itaku station.

=== Platforms ===
1	■ Ōito Line	for Matsumoto
2	■ Ōito Line	for Shinano-Ōmachi, Hakuba and Minami-Otari

== History ==
Kita-Matsumoto Station opened on 6 January 1915 as Matsumoto Station (松本駅) for both passenger and freight operations. Three months later, on 5 April 1915, a new Matsumoto Station was built, and the original station was renamed Kita-Matsumoto and used for freight operations only. Passenger operations resumed on 18 September 1916. With the privatization of Japanese National Railways (JNR) on 1 April 1987, the station came under the control of JR East. A new elevated station building was completed in April 2000.

== Passenger statistics ==
In fiscal 2015, the station was used by an average of 756 passengers daily (boarding passengers only).

== Surrounding area ==
- Matsumoto Castle
- Kaichi School Museum
- National Route 16

== See also ==
- List of railway stations in Japan
