= Jōkyō Gimin Memorial Museum =

Museum in Azumino, Japan

Coordinates: 36°16′26.281″N 137°53′48.502″E

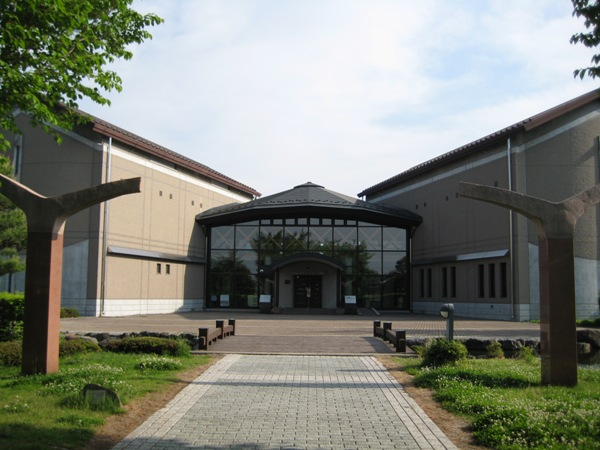
- The front view of the Jōkyō Gimin Memorial Museum
- Established: November 20, 1992
- Location: Misato-Meisei, Azumino, Nagano Prefecture, Japan
- Public transit access: Nakagaya Station on Ōito Line (JR East)
- Website: http://www.anc-tv.ne.jp/~gimin/english.html

The Jōkyō Gimin Memorial Museum (貞享義民記念館, Jōkyō Gimin Kinen-kan) is a museum dedicated to the Jōkyō Uprising that occurred in the Azumidaira area of Shinano Province of Japan in 1686 (the third year of the Jōkyō era during the Edo period). The uprising, also called the Kasuke Uprising (the leader of the peasant uprising was Tada Kasuke), is portrayed by the museum to be a struggle for the right to life. Thus the founders of the memorial museum erected two plaques at the front entrance of the building. The one on the left is inscribed with the 11th and 12th articles of the Constitution of Japan. The one on the right is inscribed with the first article of the Universal Declaration of Human Rights. Those inscribed articles clearly state the fundamental rights global citizens are entitled to: Exactly the cause which the leaders of the uprising had given their lives for.

== Goals ==
After the 300th anniversary of the Jōkyō Uprising, the local people decided to build a memorial museum to commemorate the uprising, and to preserve historic archives of the uprising. To that end they selected a building site of the museum right across the street from Jōkyō Gimin-sha (Jōkyō Gimin shrine), a Shinto shrine dedicated to twenty-eight executed farmers and the Mizuno clan (who were the local daimyōs at the time of the uprising), and the former Tada family homestead (a cultural asset of Nagano Prefecture). It is located in the former village of Nakagaya (in the Matsumoto Domain during the Edo period), where Tada Kasuke was village headman in the late 17th century.

== Building ==
The memorial museum's building is structured with two wings spread wide apart, which are intended to symbolize the open arms of Kasuke and other farmers who were executed after the uprising. The main hall in the center that connects the two wings has a roof designed to look like a conical hat. Farmers who had taken part in the uprising wore one as part of their uniform.

Also, there is an artificial stream in the front garden. The clear water of the stream symbolizes the purity of the Gimin's heart. The water is designed to remind visitors that a part of the reason for the farmers' sufferings of the time came from water shortage. It was before the time of Jikka-segi, the irrigation network this region is famed for.

== Theater ==
The Jōkyō Gimin Story is presented at the theater, Yume-dōjō (dream hall). The story is about the Jōkyō Uprising told by Oshun, the sixteen-year-old daughter of Oana Zembei, Tada Kasuke's assistant. She is said to have worked as a messenger carrying invitations to secret meetings at a local Kumano Shrine and was the only female farmer who was executed after the uprising. The seventeen-minute performance covers the development of the Jōkyō Uprising: From the exorbitant tax rise against the backdrop of crop failure, to the letter of appeal of five articles presented by Tada Kasuke and others, to the deception on the part of the executives of the domain government, and finally to the executions of twenty-eight farmers, Tada Kasuke among them.

== Exhibition ==
Items and records concerning the uprising are displayed. Highlights include:

- The letter of appeal of five articles (prepared by Tada Kasuke and others)
- The response document signed by executives of the Matsumoto Domain (turned out to be an evasive tactic)
- The copy of Shimpu-tōki, the official record of the Matsumoto Domain compiled by the Mizuno clan forty years after the uprising
- Tada Kasuke's statue (replica; the original sits in Jōkyō Gimin-sha)
- A scale model of Azumino at the time of the uprising featuring spots and areas involved in the incident

== Gallery ==
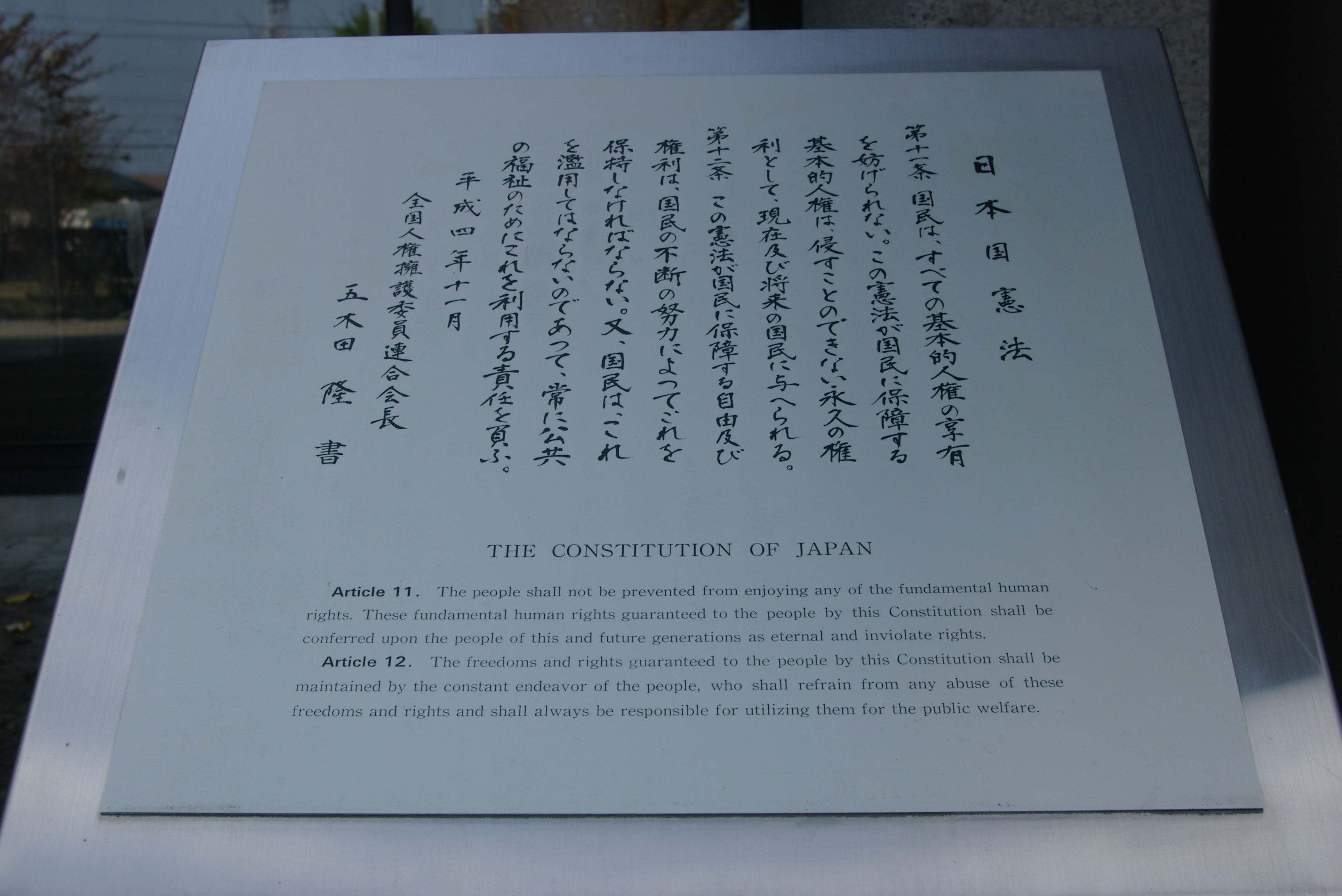
The 11th and 12th articles of the Constitution of Japan

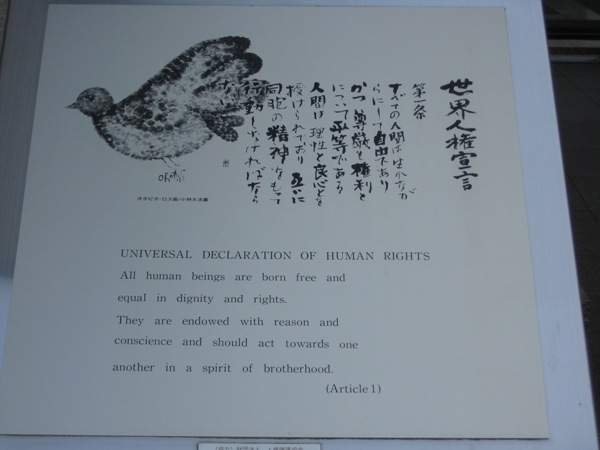
The first article of the U.D.H.R.

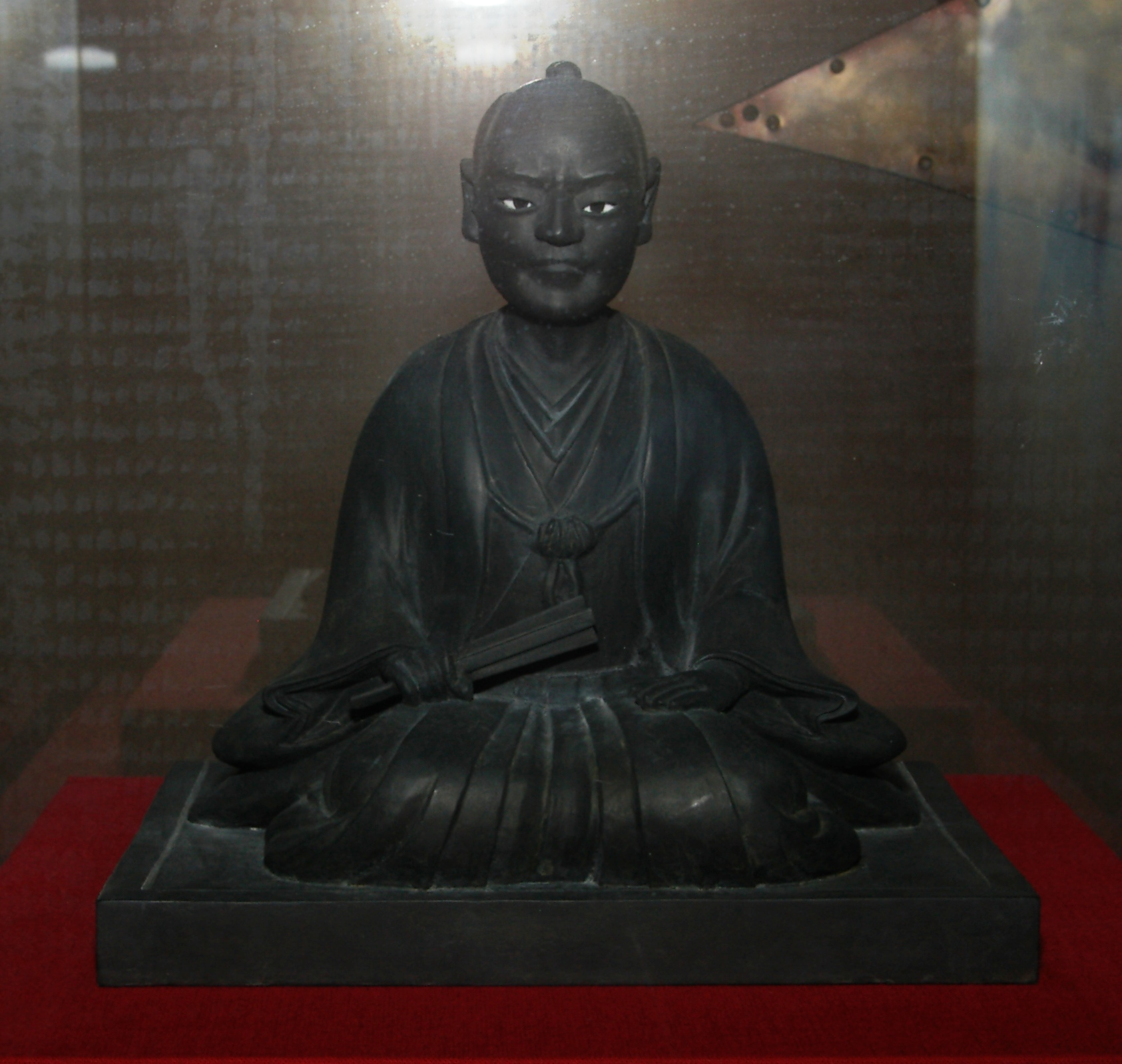
Tada Kasuke's statue (replica)

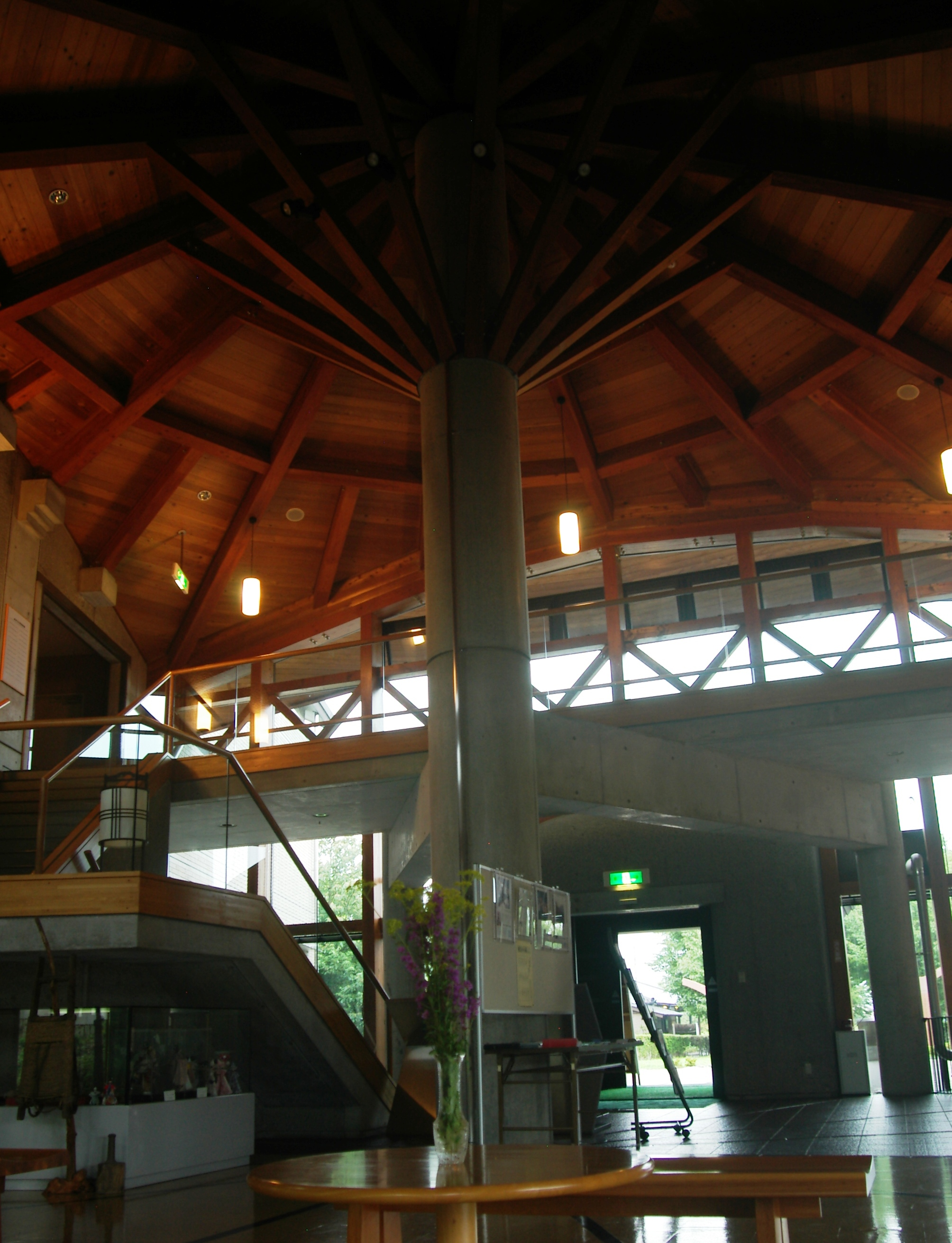
The view of the conical-shaped roof from within

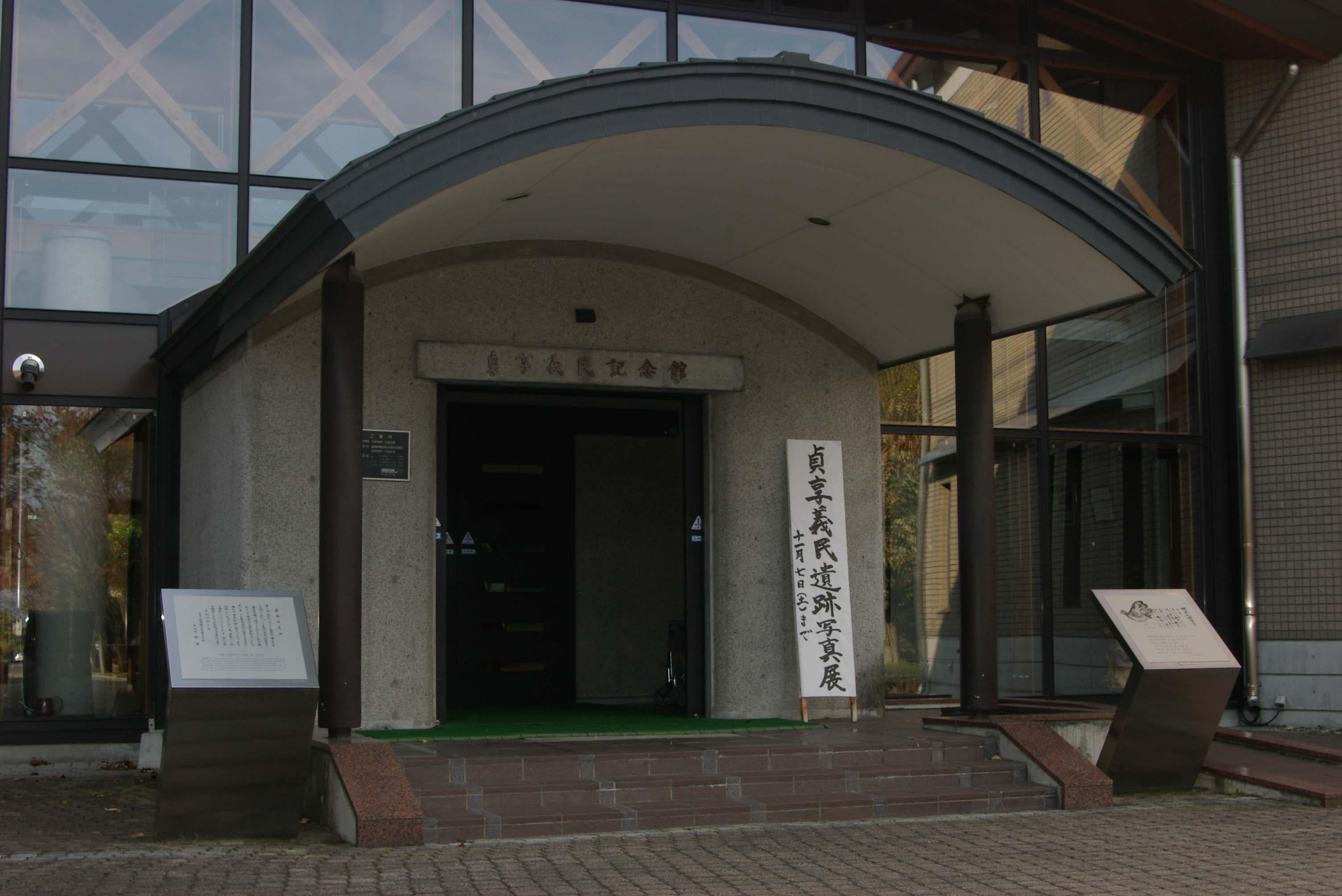
The front entrance of the museum
