= Azumi Basin =

Basin in Nagano, Japan

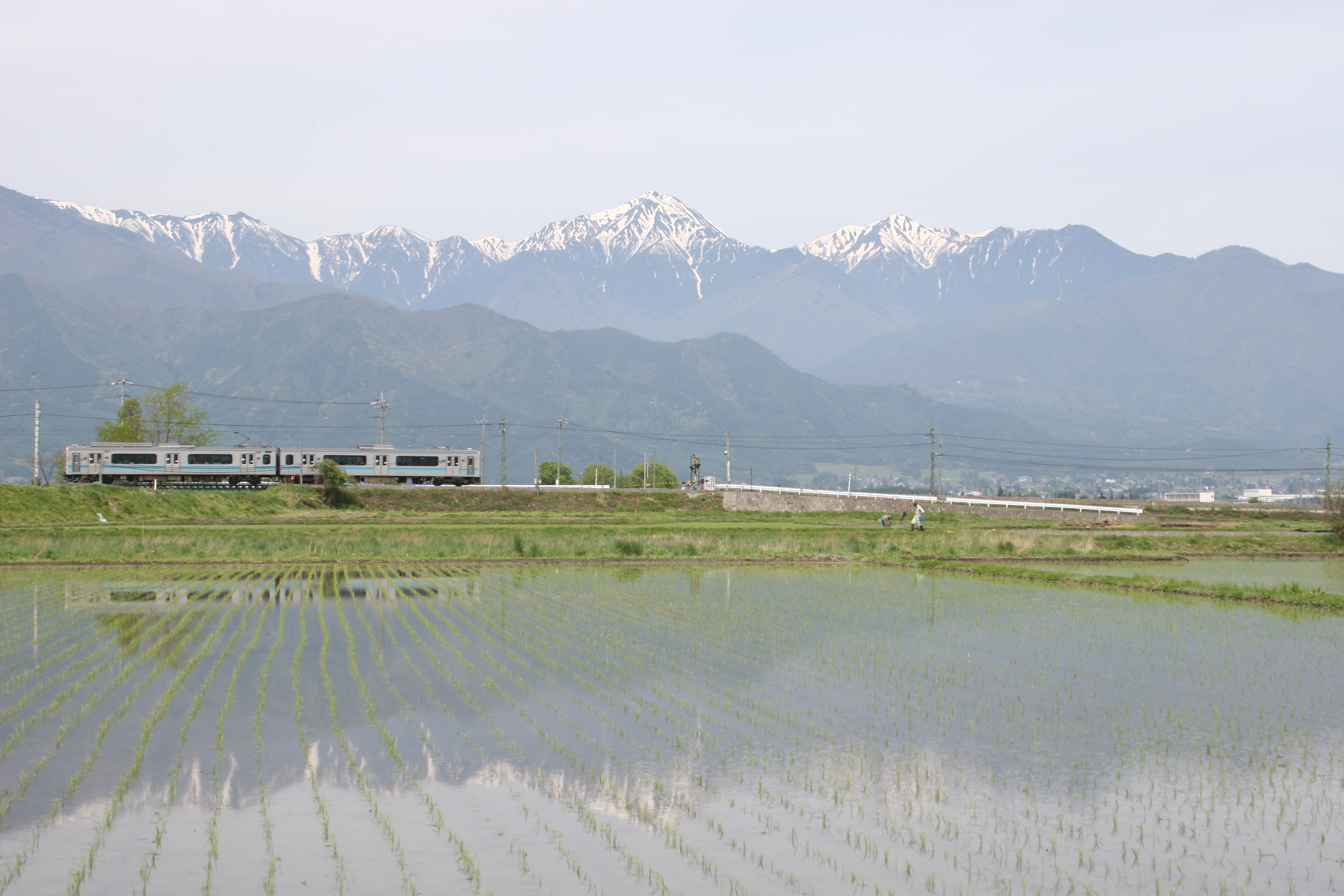
View of Azumino against the Hida Mountains

The Azumi Basin (安曇野, Azumino) is part of the Matsumoto Basin in Nagano Prefecture, Japan. It covers approximately the municipalities of Azumino, Ikeda and Matsukawa, and some parts of Matsumoto and Ōmachi . Formerly called Azumidaira, it stretches from the west banks of the Azusa and Sai rivers to the foot of the Hida Mountains (also known as the Northern Alps) in the west, and towards the southernmost watershed of the Takase River. It is known for its natural environment, museums and art galleries.

== Etymology ==
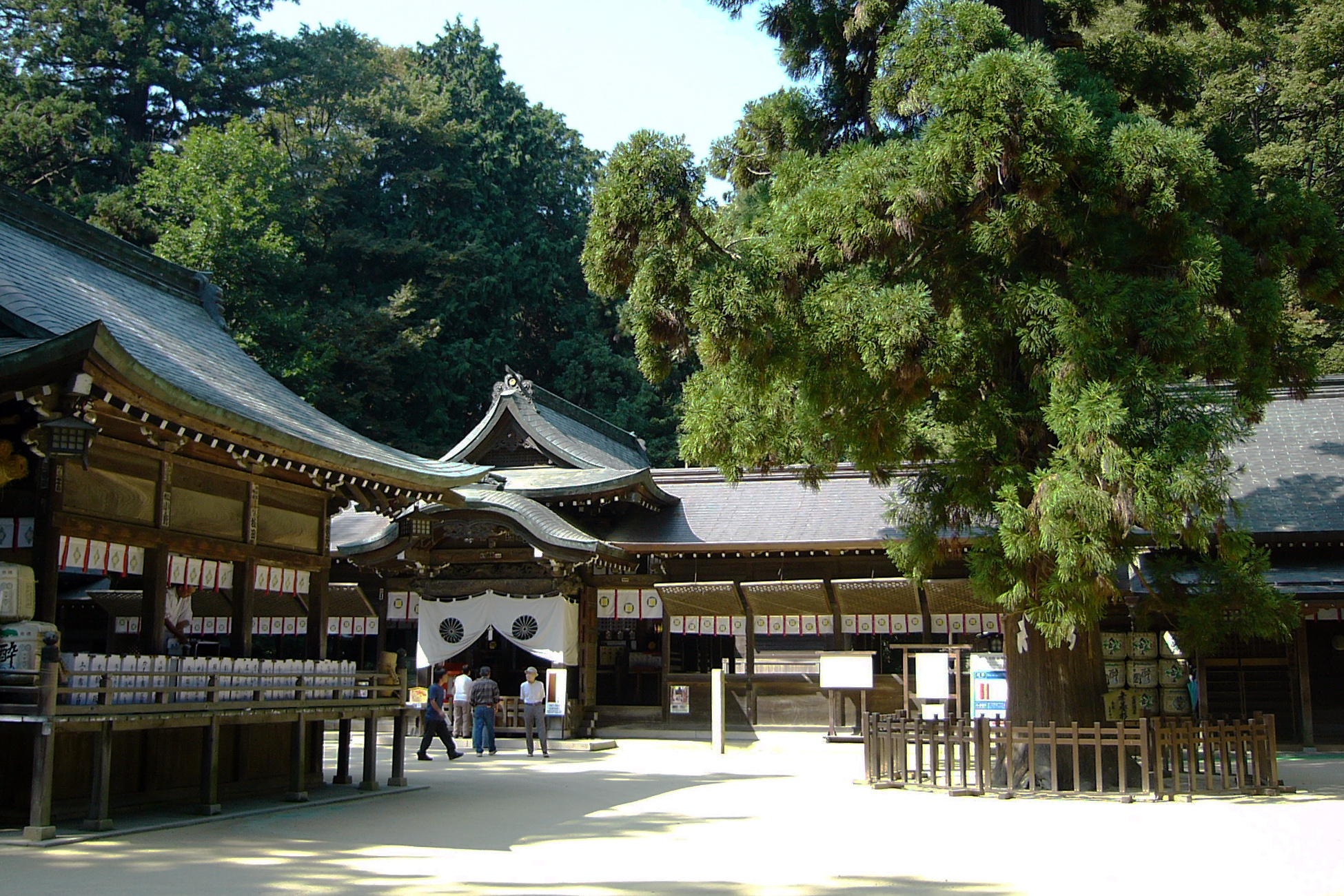
Hotaka Shrine

At least a thousand years ago, the Azumi people moved into the area and settled there. Originally, the Azumi, or "the people who live on the sea", lived in northern Kyūshū. They were famed for their skills in fishing and navigation. Between the second and the fourth century, they built a shrine on Shikanoshima island in present-day Fukuoka city in northern Kyūshū. The shrine, Shikaumi Jinja (Shikaumi Shrine), honors the gods of the sea, and has traditionally been administered by members of the Azumi people.

In the course of time the Azumi people spread to other parts of Honshū, such as the Atsumi peninsula in Aichi Prefecture and Atami in Shizuoka Prefecture. Most of their new settlements were built along seashores, with the exception of the landlocked basin in the mountainous region that was later called Azumidaira and then Azumino. The reason for their choice of this area is still unclear. Hotaka Jinja (Hotaka Shrine), located near Hotaka Station, attests to the connection between this area and Shikaumi Jinja. Hotaka Jinja, like Shikaumi Jinja, enshrines the gods of the sea.

Yoshimi Usui from this area wrote a long novel entitled Azumino, which won the prestigious Tanizaki Prize in 1974. The name Azumino has since become more common than Azumidaira.

== Irrigation network (segi) ==
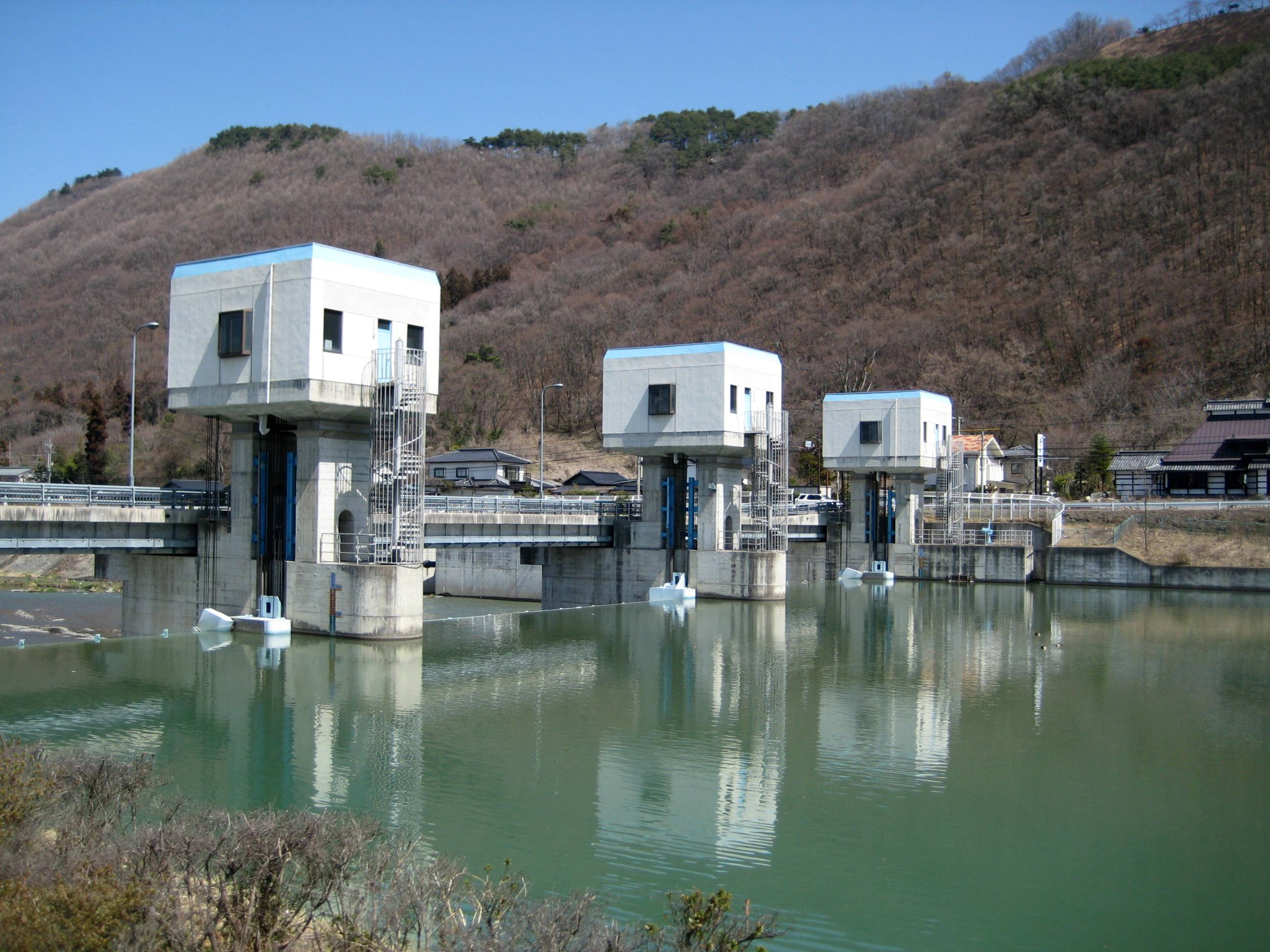
Jikka-segi weir

The Azumi Basin was created by numerous streams and rivers that take their water from melting snow on the Northern Alps. The Azusa, Kurosawa, Karasu, and Nakabusa rivers, among others, run through this region and have formed a composite fan (compare alluvial fan) characterized by the low water-holding capacity of the soil. Some streams suddenly disappear into the ground and some of these reappear as springs in the middle of green groves known in the local dialect as kemi. Many such springs are found in the Azumi Basin, but probably the most concentrated area is Azumino Wasabi-da Yūsui-gun (Azumino horseradish farm springs), designated by the Japanese Ministry of the Environment as one of the hundred best waters. The Daiō Wasabi Farm is located in the area.

Because of the low water-holding capacity of its soil, the Azumi Basin had been a parched wasteland for many centuries, except for limited small areas close to rivers and springs. The agricultural history of Azumino is almost the same thing as the history of the segi (irrigation network – another local dialect word). Since the Heian period, a number of irrigation networks have been built, for example Ryūda-segi, Nuru-segi, Toba-segi and Iida-segi. These networks are still in service. But the region had remained unproductive before the innovation of building a segi along a contour line. This type of irrigation network is called yoko-segi (horizontal irrigation network), as opposed to usual tate-segi (vertical irrigation network). In the early Edo period, after many failures, the mayor of Yabara village succeeded in building Yabara-segi along the 545-meter contour line. This success was followed in 1685 by the building of Kan'zaemon-segi and in 1849 by the Jikka-segi, designated by the Ministry of Agriculture, Forestry, and Fisheries of Japan as one of the 100 best agricultural waterways. Both were designed to run along a contour line. Today, farm land in the Azumi Basin has twice the density of irrigation as the national average, giving rise to its high agricultural productivity. The main agricultural products are rice and fruits.

== Notable people from Azumi Basin ==
=== Tada Kasuke ===
Tada Kasuke (1638? -1687) was a former Nakagaya village head who led a failed appeal to the magistrate’s office of the Matsumoto Domain, asking for lower taxes. It was in 1686, the third year of the Jōkyō era (1686) of the Edo period, when Azumidaira was part of the Matsumoto Domain under the rule of the Tokugawa shogunate. In the feudal social structure of the time, appealing was strictly forbidden. Tada Kasuke and seven other farmers were caught and executed, along with twenty people from their families, including a sixteen-year-old girl. The incident has been called the Jōkyō Uprising, or the Kasuke Uprising.

=== Kyūsaku Matsuzawa ===
Kyūsaku Matsuzawa (1855–1887) was a newspaper journalist and a people’s rights activist in the Jiyū Minken Undō (Freedom and People's Rights Movement) of the 1870s and 1880s. A talented actor, he had the idea that a play about local hero Tada Kasuke would help educate people about people’s rights. He wrote and produced Minken Kagami Kasuke no Omokage (The Image of Kasuke, a Model of the People’s Rights Movement). The play was a great success and was instrumental in relating farmers’ uprisings to people’s rights at the national level.

=== Aizō Sōma ===
Aizō Sōma (1870–1954) was a Christian philanthropist who founded Shinjuku Nakamuraya. Having received his secondary education in Matsumoto, he studied at Tokyo Senmon Gakkō (now Waseda University), and then at Sapporo Agricultural College (now Hokkaidō University). He returned to Azumidaira and established a successful silk worm business. He was involved in a campaign against drinking and brothels. He was one of the supporters of Kigenji Iguchi (see below). He married a girl named Ryō from Sendai, but she could not get used to rural life, and he moved his family to Tokyo where he founded a successful bakery called Shinjuku Nakamuraya with his wife.

=== Kigenji Iguchi ===
Kigenji Iguchi (1870–1938) was a Christian educator who founded Kensei Gijuku, a small private school in Hotaka, Nagano. While he was studying law in Tokyo at Meiji Law School (now Meiji University), he associated with Uchimura Kanzō and decided to pursue a career as an educator. He returned to Azumidaira and, after overcoming some difficulties typical of rural society, founded the school.

== Points of interest ==
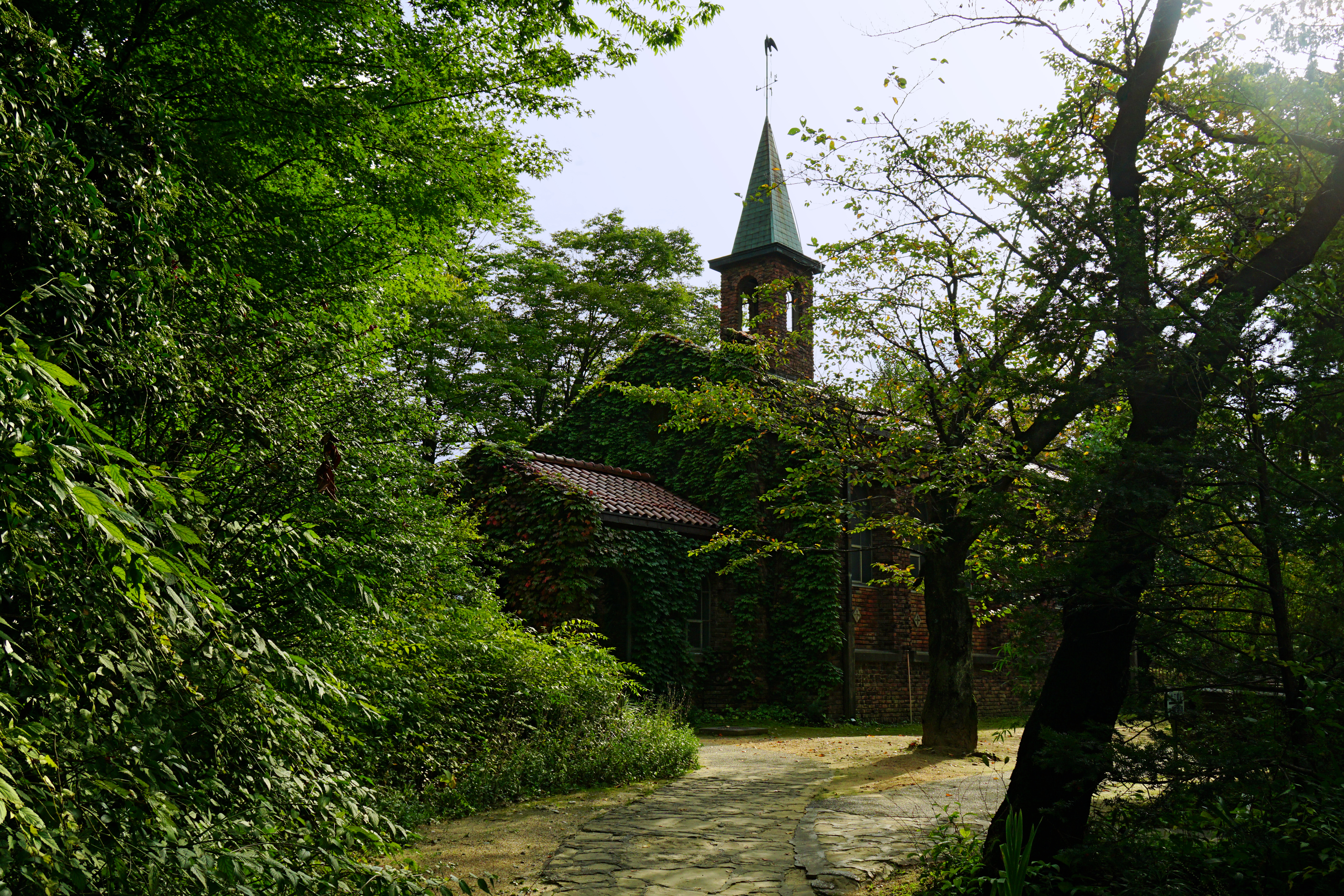
Rokuzan Art Museum

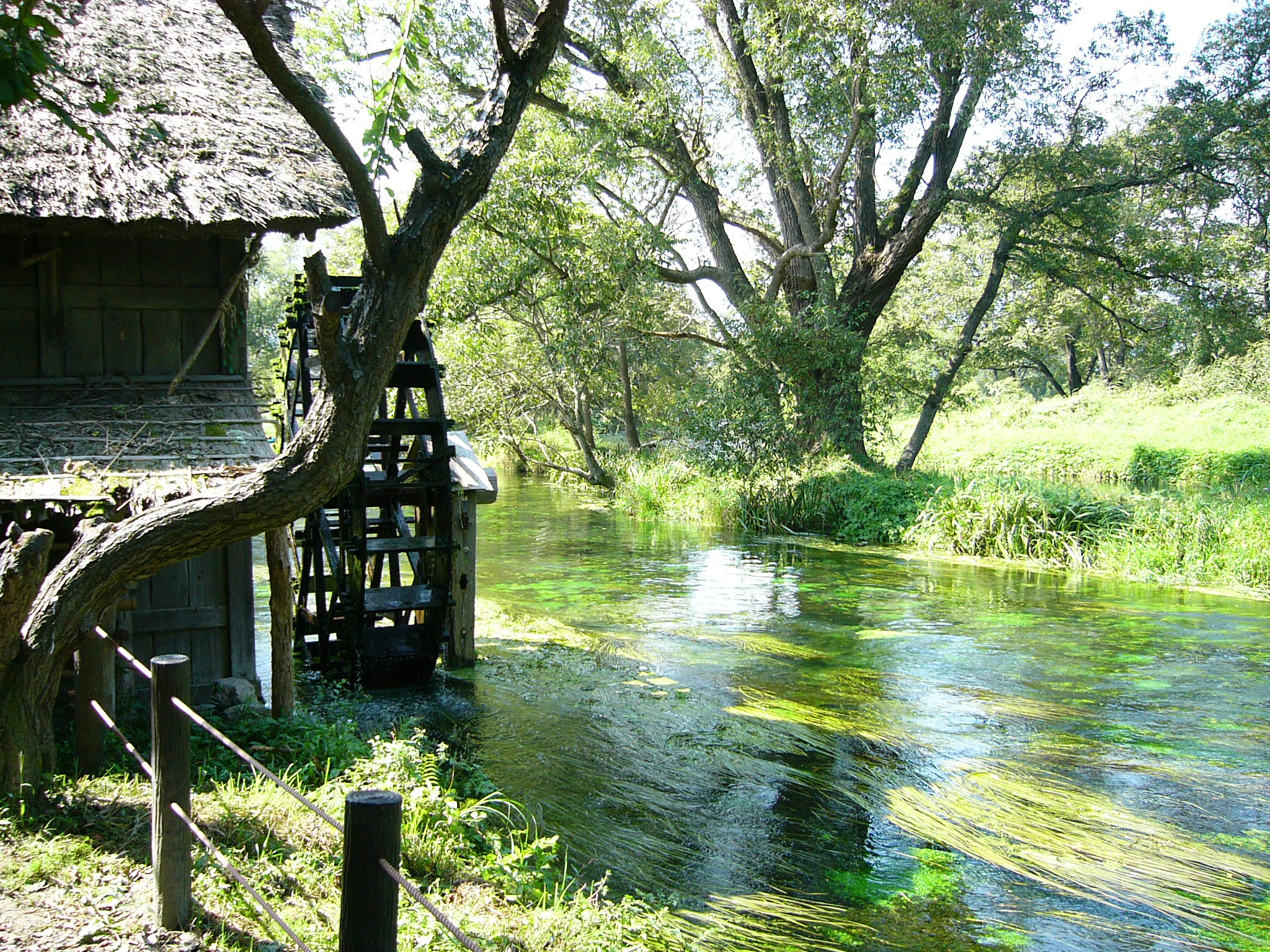
Daiō Wasabi Farm

- Itoigawa-Shizuoka Tectonic Line
- Mount Jōnen and other high mountains of the Northern Alps
- Hotaka Shrine
- Tōkō-ji Temple
- Dōsojin sculptures scattered across the region
- Hotaka Onsen-kyō (hot springs town)
- Daiō Wasabi Farm
- Alps Azumino National Government Park
- Jikka Segi and other irrigation networks
- Yukio Tabuchi Memorial Hall
- Ariake Museum of Art
- Azumino Jansem Museum (art museum)
- Azumino Picture Book Museum
- Toyoshina Museum of Modern Art
- Rokuzan Art Museum
- Takahashi Setsurō Art Museum
- Jōkyō Gimin Memorial Museum
- Yoshimi Usui Literary Museum
