= Shimatakamatsu Station =

Railway station in Matsumoto, Nagano Prefecture, Japan

Ōito Line39 Shimatakamatsu Station 島高松駅
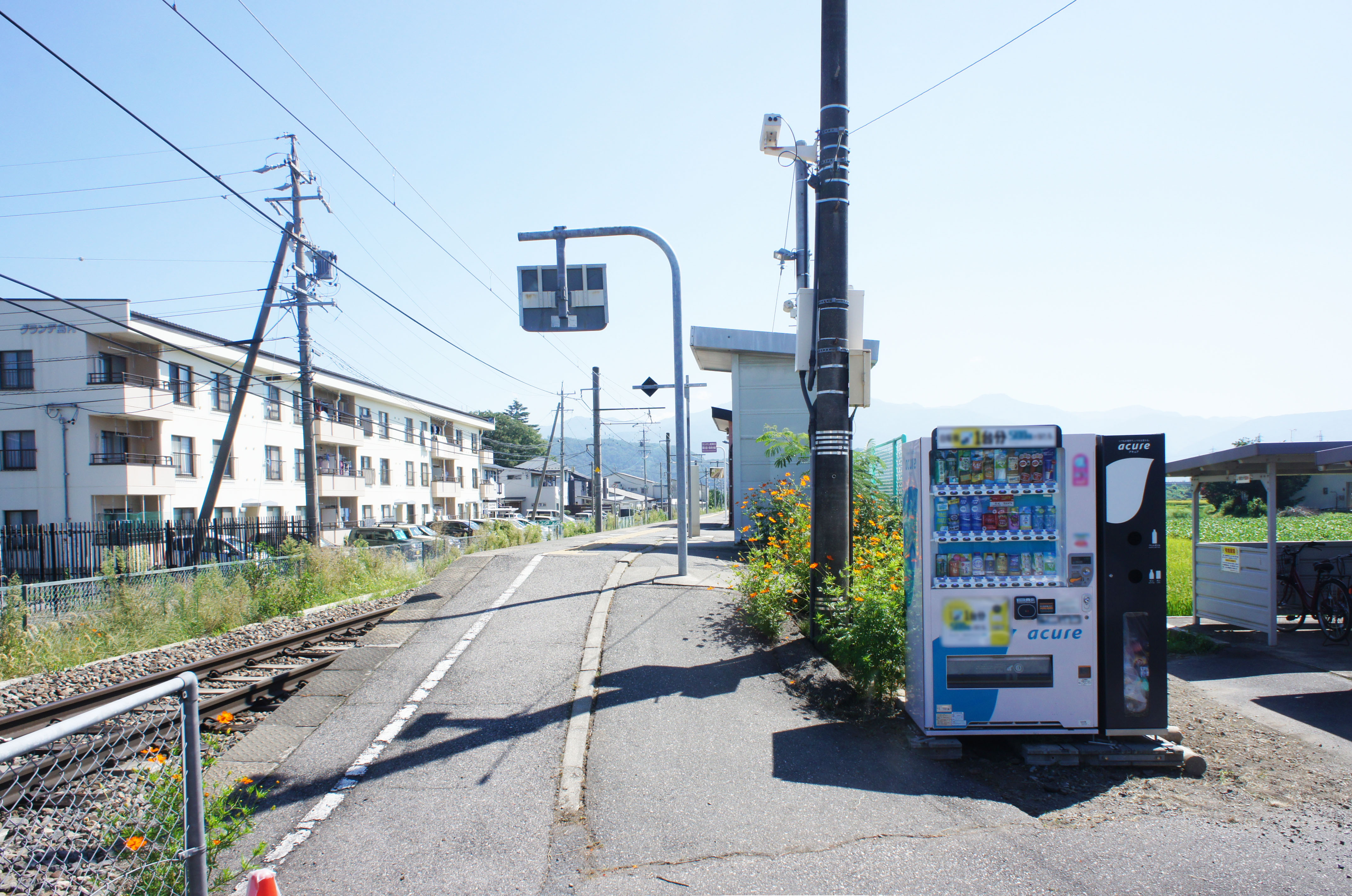
- Shimatakamatsu Station, August 2021

General information
- Location: Takamatsu Shimauchi, Matsumoto-shi, Nagano-ken 390-0851; Japan
- Coordinates: 36.2462°N 137.9318°E
- Elevation: 589.9 meters
- Operator: JR East
- Line: ■ Ōito Line
- Distance: 3.8 km from Matsumoto
- Platforms: 1 side platform

Other information
- Status: Unstaffed
- Station code: 39
- Website: Official website

History
- Opened: 14 April 1926

Passengers
- FY2011: 274

Services
Preceding station	JR East	Following station
Azusabashi One-way operation	Ōito Line Rapid	Shimauchi 40 towards Matsumoto
Azusabashi 38 towards Minami-Otari	Ōito Line Local	Shimauchi 40 towards Matsumoto
Location
- Location within Nagano Prefecture Location within Japan

Shimatakamatsu Station (島高松駅, Shimatakamatsu-eki) is a train station in the city of Matsumoto, Nagano Prefecture, Japan, operated by East Japan Railway Company (JR East).

== Lines ==
Shimatakamatsu Station is served by the Ōito Line and is 3.8 kilometers from the terminus of the line at Matsumoto Station.

== Station layout ==
The station consists of one ground-level side platform, serving a single bi-directional track. There is no station building, but only a shelter on the platform. The station is unattended.

== History ==
Shimatakamatsu Station opened on 14 April 1926. With the privatization of Japanese National Railways (JNR) on 1 April 1987, the station came under the control of JR East. A new elevated station building was completed in April 2000.

== Surrounding area ==
- National Route 147

== See also ==
- List of railway stations in Japan
