= Tada Kasuke =

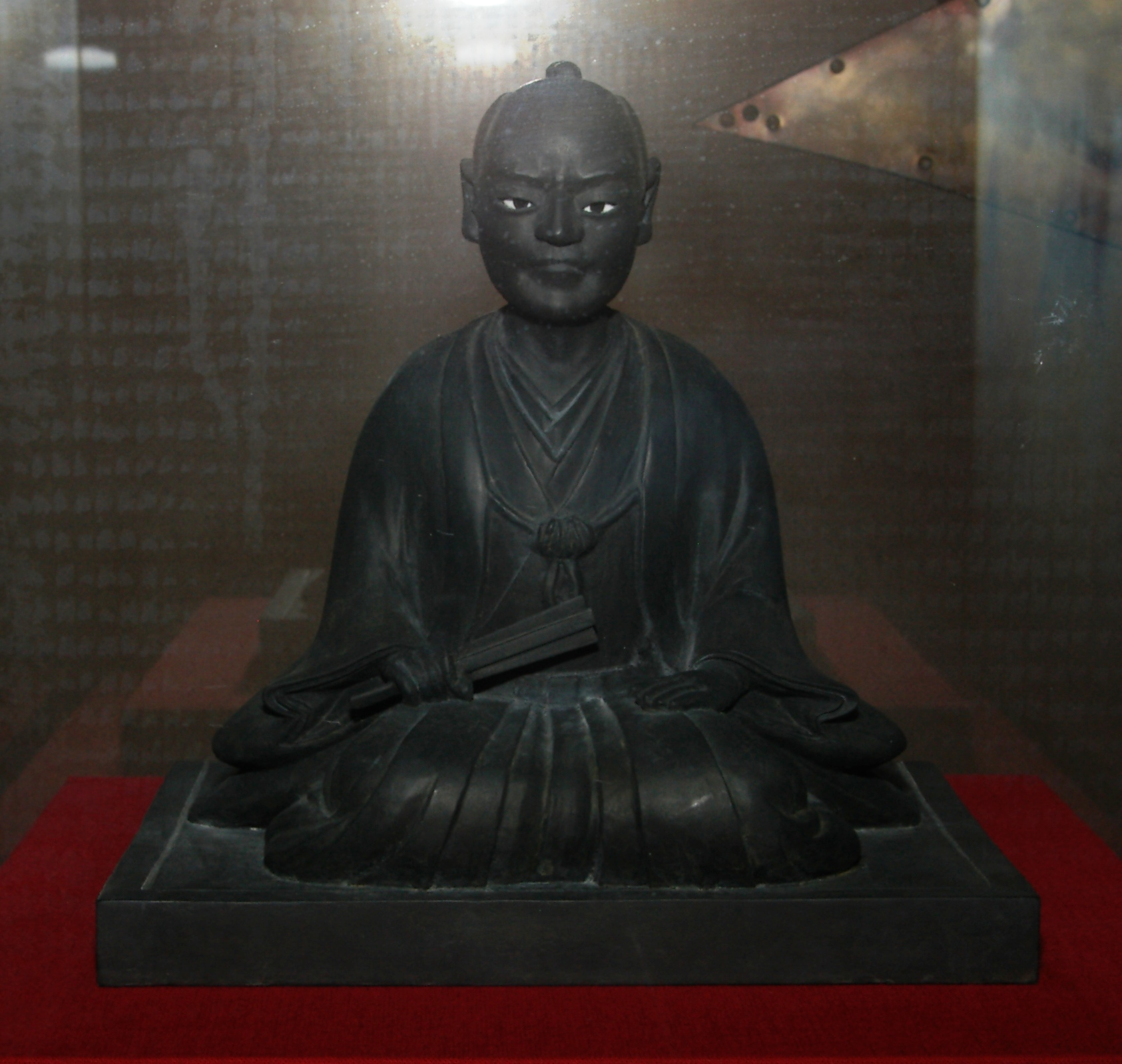
Tada Kasuke's statue (replica)

Tada Kasuke (多田加助)(date of birth unknown—died January 1, 1687, or in the third year of the Jōkyō era) was a Japanese farmer who led a failed appeal for lowered taxes in Azumidaira, a part of the Matsumoto Domain under the control of the Tokugawa shogunate. He was caught and executed along with twenty-seven farmers without trial. The rebellion has been called the Jōkyō Uprising, or the Kasuke Uprising.

== Family life ==
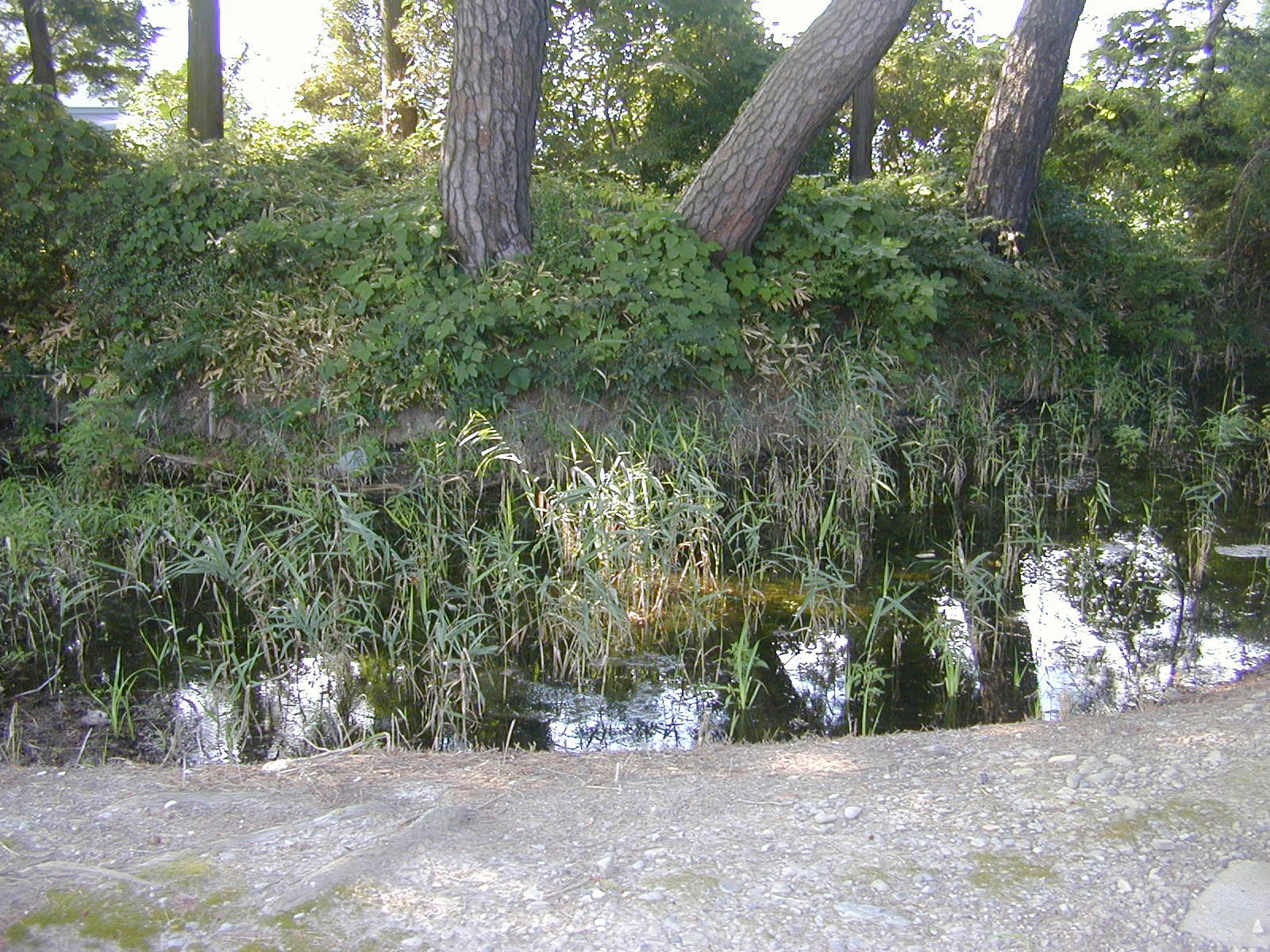
The Tada homestead, a cultural asset of Nagano

Tada Kasuke was born into a wealthy farmer’s family in the late 1630s. The Tada family homestead was surrounded by moats and mounds, which suggests the power and position they held. Traditionally the head of the family became the headman of Nakagaya village, and Kasuke took over the position when his father retired. He was an educated man, who was said to have been influenced by the Wang Yangming school of Neo-Confucianism.

In around 1680, he was fired as village head when authorities decided that he was too lenient on peasants. He had a wife named Otami, two sons, and three daughters. At the time of the uprising, the first-born son named Dempachi was twelve years old, and the second son named Sanzō was eight.

Both of them were caught and executed, though neither of them had taken part in the incident. In addition, Kasuke had an unmarried younger brother named Hikonojō. He took part in the uprising, and was executed. Some people believe that he was engaged to Oshyun, the sixteen-year-old girl who took part in the uprising. She was also executed.)

== Jōkyō Uprising ==
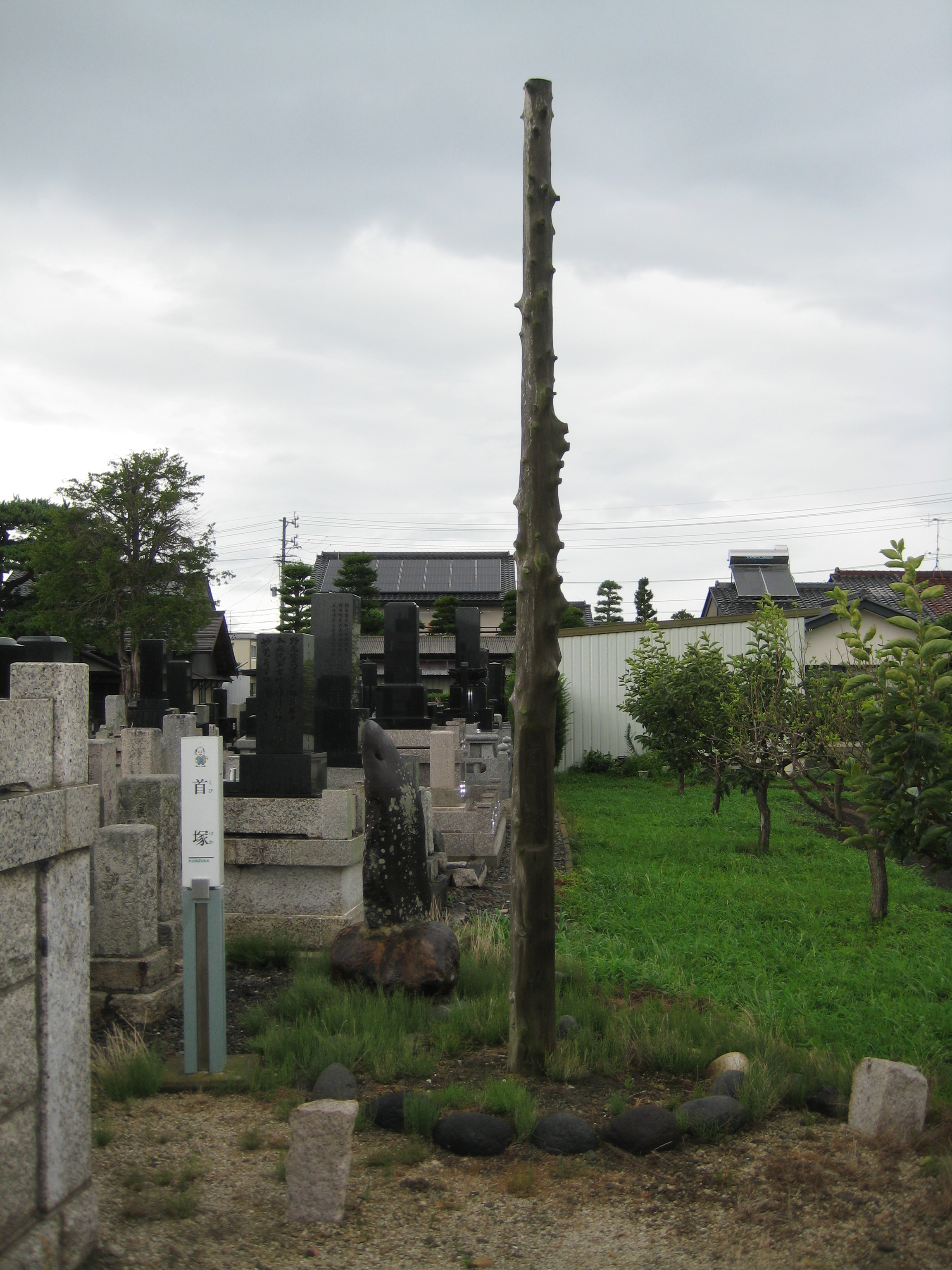
Tada Kasuke's severed head is buried here.

In 1686, the domain government of Matsumoto raised taxes to a very high level. But the Azumidaira area had been hit by crop failure, and the tax rise was exorbitant. In the fall of that year, Tada Kasuke and a number of farmers’ leaders gathered at a local shrine, called Kumano Jinja (Kumano Shrine), and held a series of meetings. They decided to appeal to the magistrate’s office in Matsumoto, though they fully understood that they were risking their lives in doing so.

They wrote a letter of appeal of five articles, in which they asked for lowered taxes. On October 14, they hand delivered the letter to the magistrate’s office outside Matsumoto Castle. Tada Kasuke and his followers expected to carry out this mission peacefully. But when word spread that they were appealing, thousands of peasants gathered at Matsumoto Castle. One scholar who disagrees with this notion claims that the leaders did intend to perpetrate an uprising.

Some peasants stormed shops, others committed robbery, and others attacked wealthy merchants. The domain lord, Mizuno Tadanao, was away in Edo at the time, and executives of the domain government had to deal with the situation themselves. After all, the tax rise in question had obviously been decided by the executives without consulting the lord. In order to settle the incident, the executives at Matsumoto Castle agreed to grant the farmers their wishes.

On October 18, five executives signed documents promising that the taxes would be lowered. It seemed a peaceful end to a stormy incident. But a month later, Kasuke and his followers were arrested and the documents signed by the executives were confiscated. The farmers were cheated by the authorities.

Without trial, twenty-eight farmers were executed on November 22 (or January 5, 1687 by the solar calendar). Kasuke's last words were a passionate outcry for lowered taxes. The executions were witnessed by hundreds of citizens, which was the custom of those days. The scene of Kasuke's last moment made an enormous impact on the people.

== Kasuke shrine ==
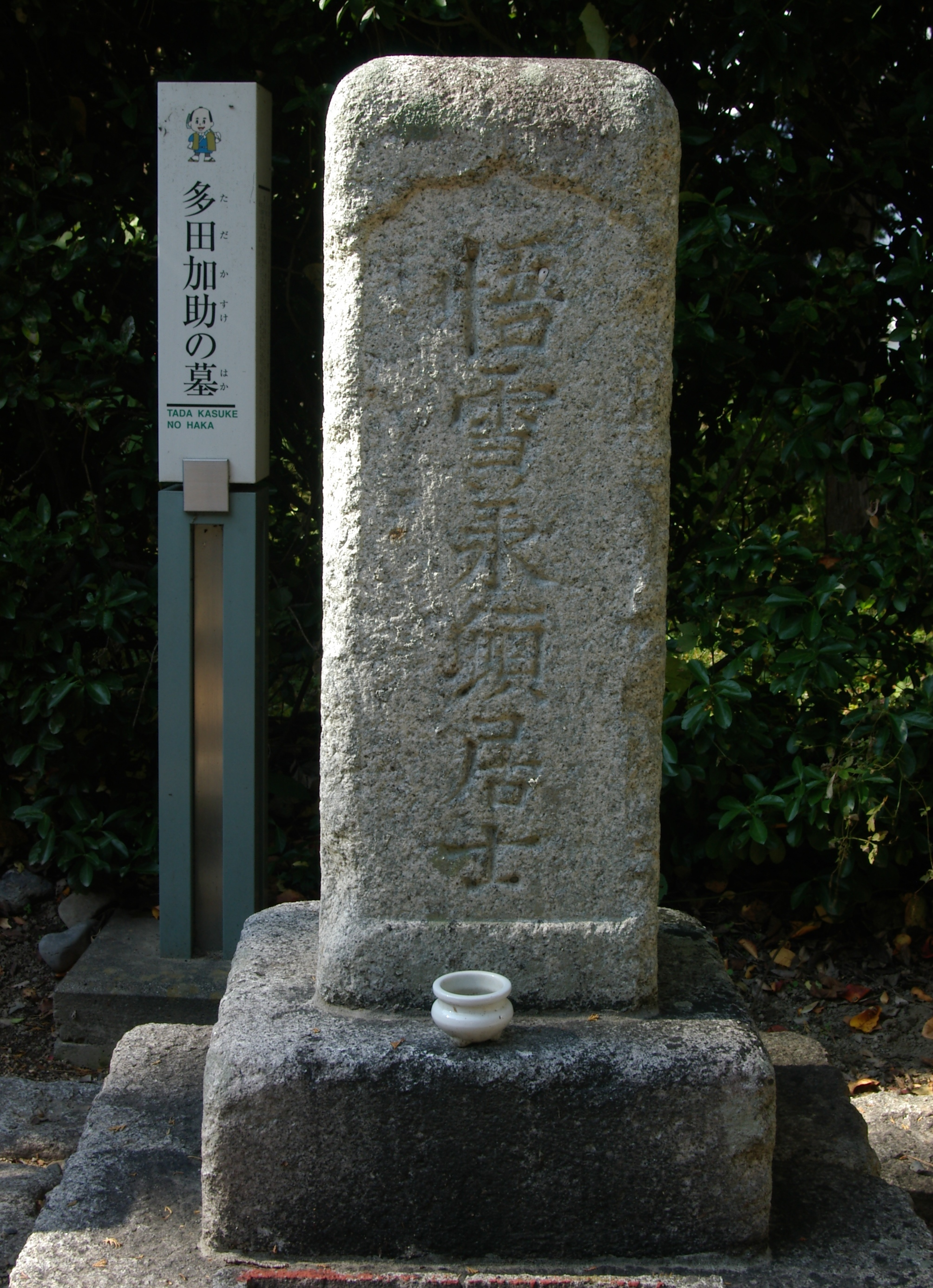
Tada Kasuke's gravestone

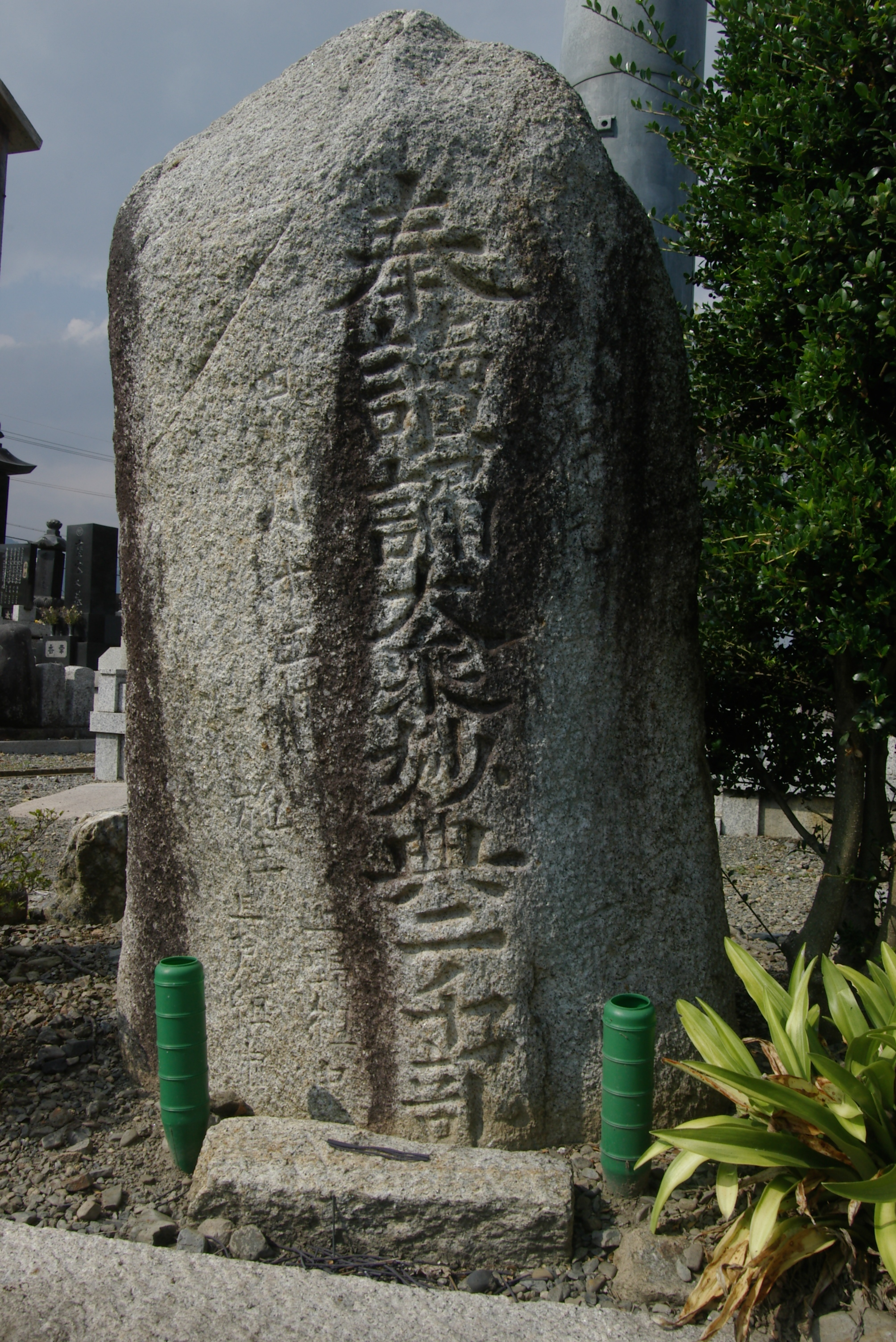
The stone pagoda in Niré commemorating the 50th anniversary of the uprising

Several decades passed before people could openly commemorate and appreciate Tada Kasuke and others. For one thing, while the domain lord's family, the Mizuno clan, was ruling the Matsumoto Domain, the executed farmers were deemed as rebels. In 1725 the lord of the Mizunos at the time was dethroned after a dishonorable incident which he perpetrated at Edo Castle. The Toda clan took over the Matsumoto Domain the following year.

The first evidence of the commemoration of Kasuke, or Gimin (martyr, in the non-religious sense) as he was referred to, was a household altar dedicated to Kasuke and other executed members of the Tadas founded on the grounds of the Tada homestead in 1735. At around the same time, a stone pagoda inscribed with Buddhist scripture was erected to commemorate the fiftieth anniversary of the uprising. The stone (140 cm tall and 75 cm wide) stands in Niré, where Kasuke's right arm, Oana Zembei, had governed.

Kasuke was also given a kaimyō (afterlife name) soon after his death. The meaning of the kaimyō clearly shows how Kasuke was honored as a selfless person. The name was inscribed on his gravestone when it was erected in the Tada family cemetery many years later.

On the part of the Mizuno clan, they suffered a number of mishaps after the uprising. The final blow was the dethronement of Mizuno Tadatsune, Mizuno Tadanao's grandson. Fearing that those unfortunate incidents might be the karmic backlash of Kasuke's passion, the Mizuno family had a statue of Kasuke sculptured and reverently placed it inside the homestead.

In 1786 the household altar honoring Kasuke and others was renovated to observe the centennial anniversary of the uprising. A hundred years later in the Meiji period, the altar was moved out of the Tada homestead to a new site nearby and was expanded to a shrine. Kasuke's followers who had been executed were also enshrined there in 1880 to commemorate the bicentennial anniversary. This is the origin of Kasuke shrine.

== Kasuke shrine to Jōkyō Gimin shrine ==
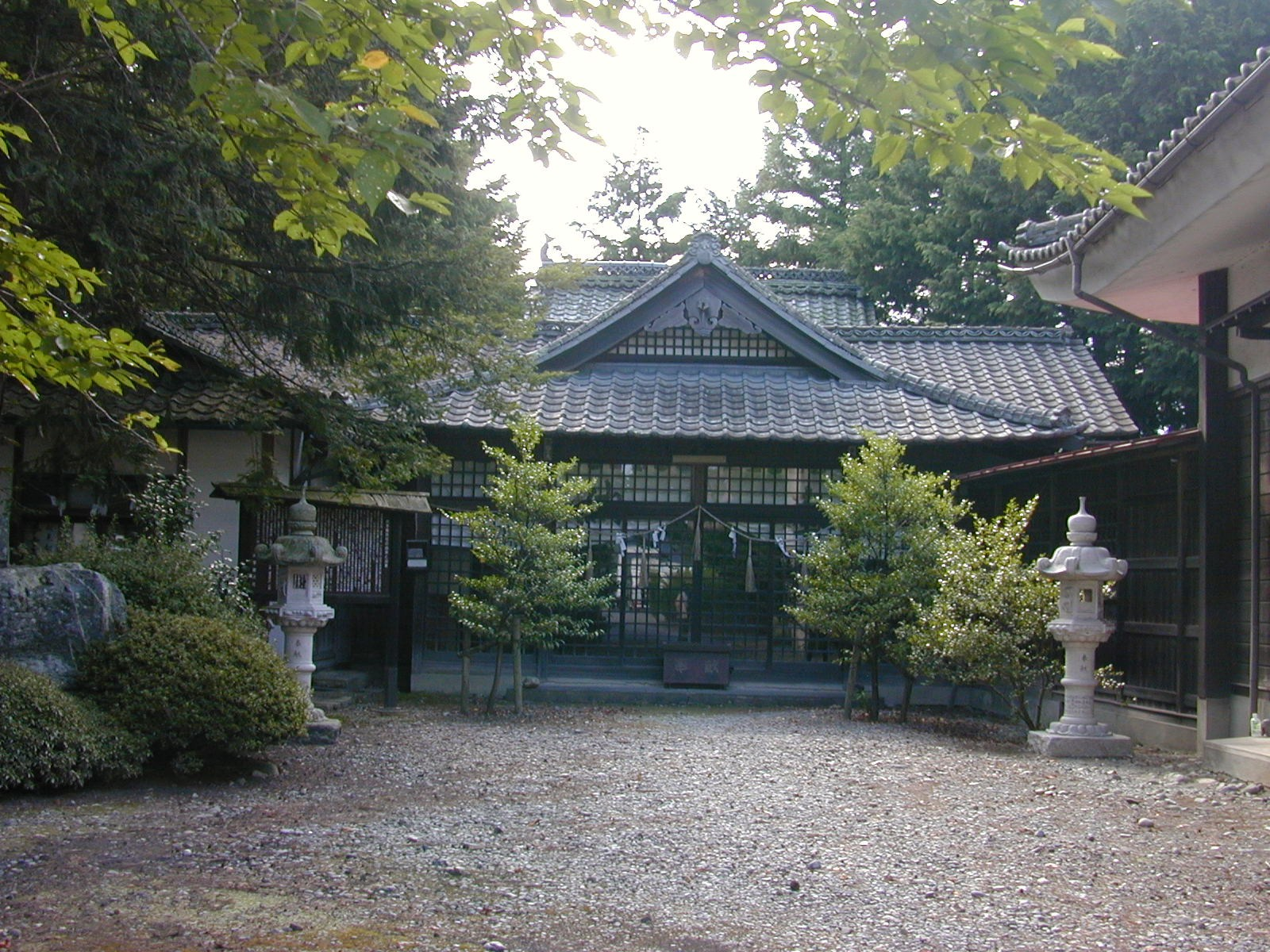
Jōkyō Gimin shrine

Tada Kasuke and the Jōkyō Uprising were buried in oblivion before the Jiyū-Minken Undo (Freedom and People's Rights Movement) raged nationwide in the 1870s and 1880s during the Meiji period. Matsuzawa Kyūsaku from Azumidaira featured Tada Kasuke in his column in the newspaper, and went on to dramatize the story. Matsuzawa perceived the Jōkyō Uprising as a model of the Freedom and People's Rights Movement. Because he understood that what Kasuke had struggled for was the right to life, though there was no such concept as human rights two hundred years before.

In 1898 the sculpture of Kasuke, along with some money, was donated to Kasuke shrine by the Mizuno family. The sculpture has been an object of worship ever since. The interesting thing about it is that Mizuno Tadanao was enshrined there on this occasion. The reason for his enshrinement is believed to be that the passage of two hundred years had assuaged the grief and bitterness on the part of the descendants of Kasuke and his followers.

Besides, Mizuno Tadanao was widely believed to have been the victim himself in that he had been kept in the dark during and after the uprising. Obviously, the lord consented to the executions of the farmers without the knowledge of the tax rise that had triggered the uprising. The real culprits were the executives at Matsumoto Castle and the petty officials who were in charge of collecting taxes. The reasoning behind this was not very common, but not unheard of.

In 1960 Kasuke shrine was granted the status of religious institution as Jōkyō Gimin-sha (Jōkyō Gimin shrine) by the Association of Shinto Shrines.

== The tercentennial and the Jōkyō Gimin Memorial Museum ==
In 1986 the tercentennial anniversary of the uprising was observed with much enthusiasm. The nearest railroad station to Jōkyō Gimin-sha is Nakagaya Station on Ōito Line. The post-house of the station was remodeled after the shrine. A number of books were published and cassette tapes made about the uprising. There was a surge in public sentiment of desire for a memorial museum around this time.

In 1992, Azumino people founded a memorial museum in honor of the uprising. It was built right across the street from Jōkyō Gimin-sha. The museum is called Jōkyō Gimin Memorial Museum. Two plaques stand on each side of the main entrance to the museum. One is inscribed with the 11th and 12th articles of the Constitution of Japan. The other is inscribed with the first article of the Universal Declaration of Human Rights. The inscriptions on the two plaques are both in Japanese and English, which clearly shows a global perspective of the founding fathers of the museum.
