= Shimauchi Station =

Railway station in Matsumoto, Nagano Prefecture, Japan

Ōito Line40 Shimauchi Station 島内駅
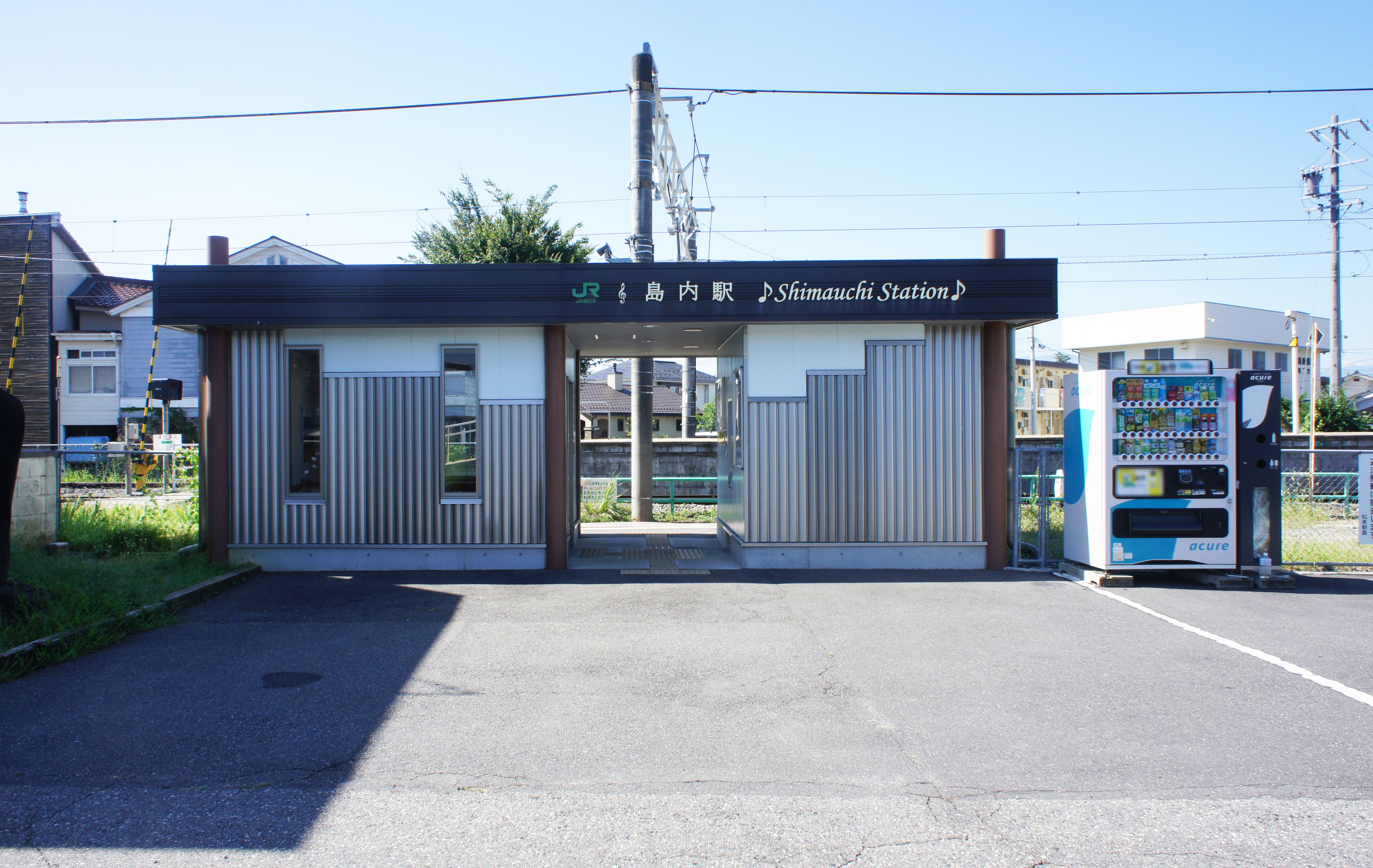

General information
- Location: 4587 Aoshima Shimauchi, Matsumoto-shi, Nagano-ken 390-0851; Japan
- Coordinates: 36.2468°N 137.9448°E
- Elevation: 579.8 meters
- Operator: JR East
- Line: ■ Ōito Line
- Distance: 2.6 km from Matsumoto
- Platforms: 1 island platform

Other information
- Status: Unstaffed
- Station code: 40
- Website: Official website

History
- Opened: 1 November 1915

Passengers
- FY2011: 371

Services
Preceding station	JR East	Following station
Shimatakamatsu One-way operation	Ōito Line Rapid	Kita-Matsumoto 41 towards Matsumoto
Shimatakamatsu 39 towards Minami-Otari	Ōito Line Local	Kita-Matsumoto 41 towards Matsumoto
Location
- Location within Nagano Prefecture Location within Japan

Shimauchi Station (島内駅, Shimauchi-eki) is a train station in the city of Matsumoto, Nagano Prefecture, Japan, operated by East Japan Railway Company (JR East).

== Lines ==
Shimauchi Station is served by the Ōito Line and is 2.6 kilometers from the terminus of the line at Matsumoto Station.

== Station layout ==
The station consists of one ground-level island platform, connected to the station building by a level crossing. The station is unattended.

=== Platforms ===
1	■ Ōito Line	for Shinano-Ōmachi, Hakuba and Minami-Otari
2	■ Ōito Line	for Matsumoto

== History ==
Shimauchi Station opened on 1 November 1915. With the privatization of Japanese National Railways (JNR) on 1 April 1987, the station came under the control of JR East.

== Surrounding area ==
- Shimauchi Post Office
- Shimauchi Middle School
- Shimauchi Elementary School

== See also ==
- List of railway stations in Japan
