= Minami-Toyoshina Station =

Railway station in Azumino, Nagano Prefecture, Japan

Ōito Line35 Minami-Toyoshina Station 南豊科駅
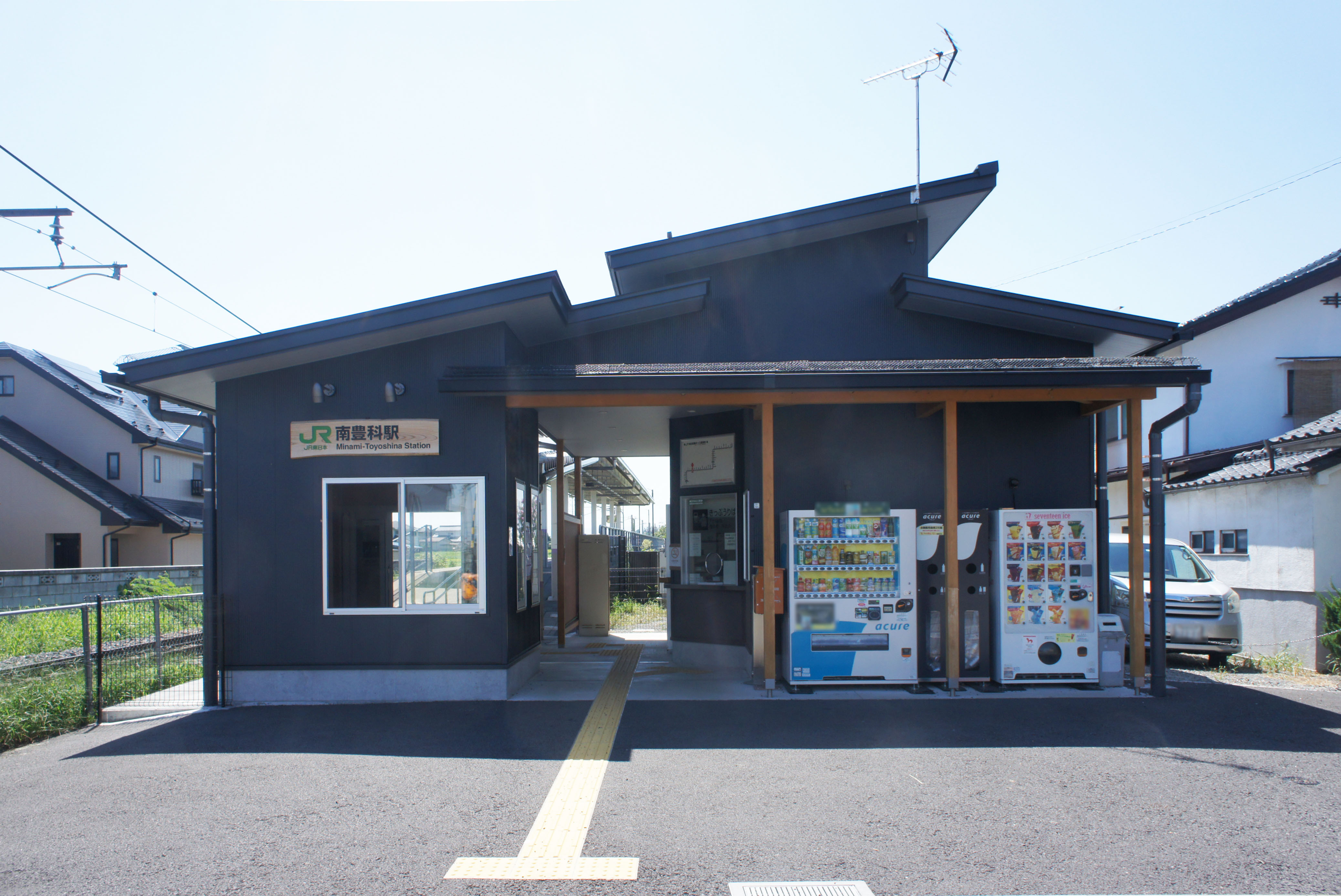
- Minami-Toyoshina Station, August 2021

General information
- Location: 2229 Toyoshina, Azumino-shi, Nagano-ken 399-8205; Japan
- Coordinates: 36°17′30.38″N 137°54′12.09″E
- Elevation: 561.1 meters
- Operator: JR East
- Line: ■ Ōito Line
- Distance: 10.4 km from Matsumoto
- Platforms: 1 side platform

Other information
- Status: Staffed
- Station code: 35
- Website: Official website

History
- Opened: 14 April 1926

Passengers
- FY2015: 867

Services
Preceding station	JR East	Following station
Toyoshina One-way operation	Ōito Line Rapid	Nakagaya 36 towards Matsumoto
Toyoshina 34 towards Minami-Otari	Ōito Line Local	Nakagaya 36 towards Matsumoto
Location
- Location within Nagano Prefecture Location within Japan

Minami-Toyoshina Station (南豊科駅, Minami-Toyoshina-eki) is a train station in the city of Azumino, Nagano Prefecture, Japan, operated by East Japan Railway Company (JR East).

== Lines ==
Minami-Toyoshina Station is served by the Ōito Line and is 10.4 kilometers from the terminus of the line at Matsumoto Station.

== Station layout ==
The station consists of one ground-level side platform serving a single bi-cirectional track. The station is a Kan'i itaku station.

== History ==
Minami-Toyoshina Station opened on 14 April 1926. With the privatization of Japanese National Railways (JNR) on 1 April 1987, the station came under the control of JR East. A new station building was completed in 2015.

== Passenger statistics ==
In fiscal 2015, the station was used by an average of 867 passengers daily (boarding passengers only).

== Surrounding area ==
- National Route 147
- Toyoshina High School
- Minami-Azumino Toyoshina Agricultural High School

== See also ==
- List of railway stations in Japan
