= Hitoichiba Station =

Railway station in Azumino, Nagano Prefecture, Japan

Ōito Line37 Hitoichiba Station 一日市場駅
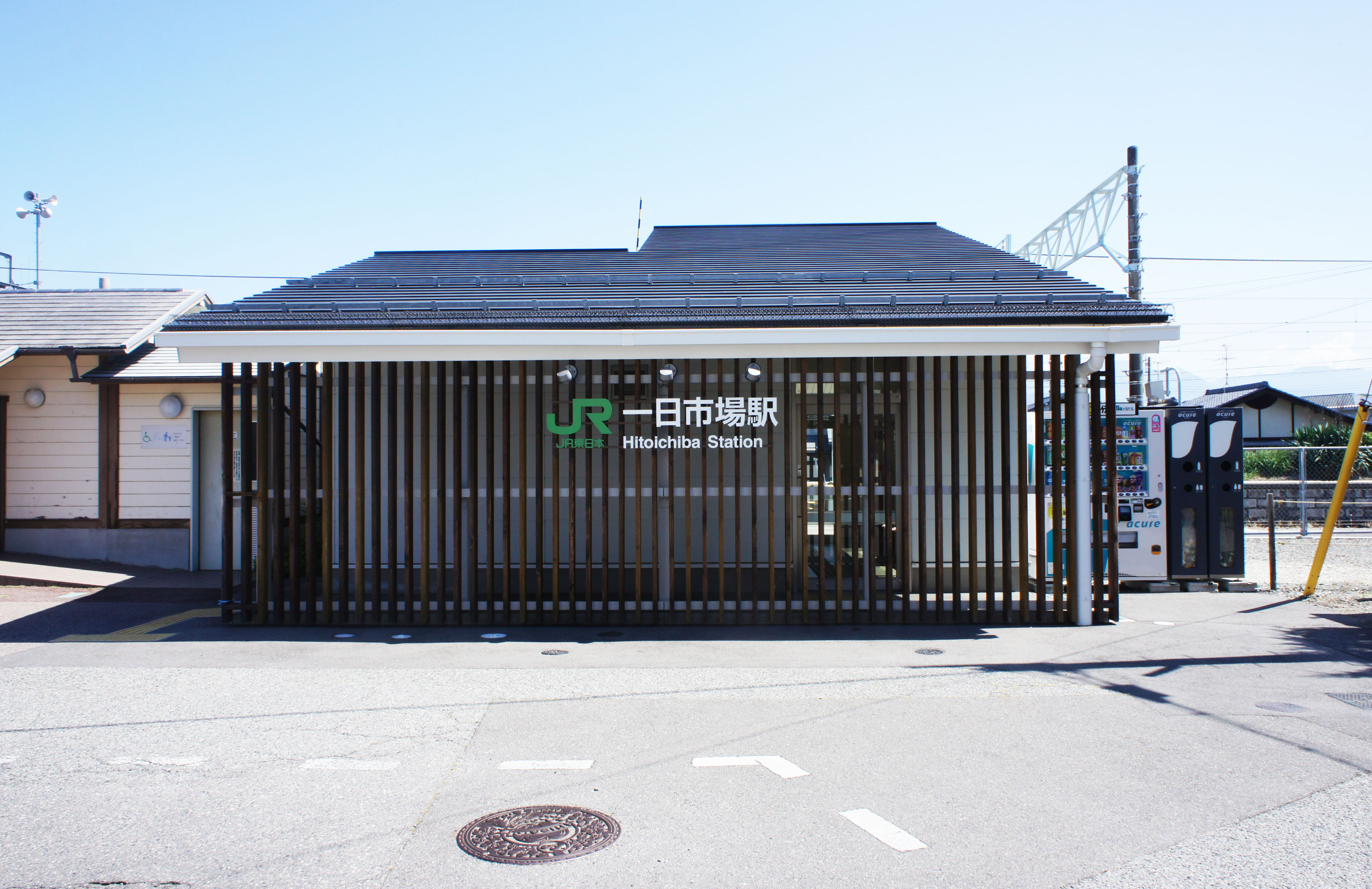
- Hitoichiba Station, August 2021

General information
- Location: 1358 Misatomeisei, Azumino-shi, Nagano-ken 399-8101; Japan
- Coordinates: 36°15′34.61″N 137°54′14.88″E
- Elevation: 593.9 meters
- Operator: JR East
- Line: ■ Ōito Line
- Distance: 6.8 km from Matsumoto
- Platforms: 1 island platform

Other information
- Status: Staffed
- Station code: 37
- Website: Official website

History
- Opened: 6 January 1915
- Former names: Meisei Station (to May 1915)

Passengers
- FY2015: 777

Services
Preceding station	JR East	Following station
Nakagaya One-way operation	Ōito Line Rapid	Azusabashi 38 towards Matsumoto
Nakagaya 36 towards Minami-Otari	Ōito Line Local	Azusabashi 38 towards Matsumoto
Location
- Location within Nagano Prefecture Location within Japan

Hitoichiba Station (一日市場駅, Hitoichiba-eki) is a train station in the city of Azumino, Nagano Prefecture, Japan, operated by East Japan Railway Company (JR East).

== Lines ==
Hitoichiba Station is served by the Ōito Line and is 6.8 kilometers from the terminus of the line at Matsumoto Station.

== Station layout ==
The station consists of one ground-level island platform serving a two tracks. The station is a Kan'i itaku station.

=== Platforms ===
1	■ Ōito Line	for Hotaka, Toyoshina, Shinano-Ōmachi and Minami-Otari
2	■ Ōito Line	for Matsumoto and Shiojiri

== History ==
Hitoichiba Station opened on 6 January 1915 as Meisei Station (明盛駅). It was renamed to its present name on 1 May of the same year. With the privatization of Japanese National Railways (JNR) on 1 April 1987, the station came under the control of JR East. A new station building was completed in 2015.

== Passenger statistics ==
In fiscal 2015, the station was used by an average of 777 passengers daily (boarding passengers only).

== Surrounding area ==
- former Misato Village Hall
- Misato Post Office

== See also ==
- List of railway stations in Japan
