= Azusabashi Station =

Railway station in Azumino, Nagano Prefecture, Japan

Ōito Line38 Azusabashi Station 梓橋駅
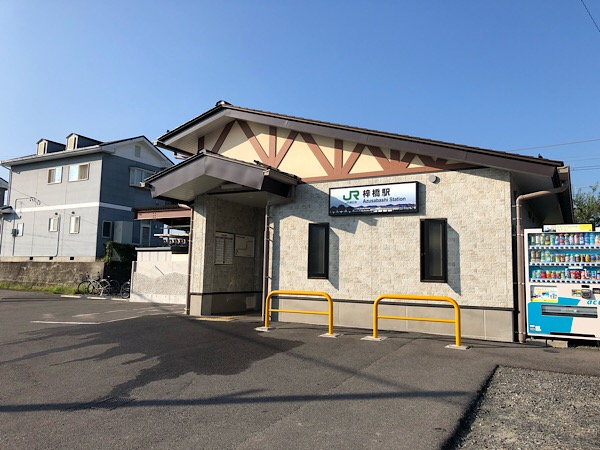
- Azusabashi Station in August 2019

General information
- Location: 5259-2 Toyoshinatakibe, Azumino-shi, Nagano-ken 399-8204; Japan
- Coordinates: 36°15′2.243″N 137°55′4.99″E
- Elevation: 595.5 meters
- Operator: JR East
- Line: ■ Ōito Line
- Distance: 5.2 km from Matsumoto
- Platforms: 1 side platform
- Tracks: 1

Other information
- Status: Staffed
- Station code: 38
- Website: Official website

History
- Opened: 6 January 1915

Passengers
- FY2015: 452 daily

Services
Preceding station	JR East	Following station
Hitoichiba One-way operation	Ōito Line Rapid	Shimatakamatsu 39 towards Matsumoto
Hitoichiba 37 towards Minami-Otari	Ōito Line Local	Shimatakamatsu 39 towards Matsumoto
Location
- Location within Nagano Prefecture Location within Japan

Azusabashi Station (梓橋駅, Azusabashi-eki) is a railway station on the Ōito Line in Azumino, Nagano, Japan, operated by East Japan Railway Company (JR East).

== Lines ==
Azusabashi Station is served by the Ōito Line and is 5.2 kilometers from the starting point of the line at Matsumoto Station.

== Station layout ==
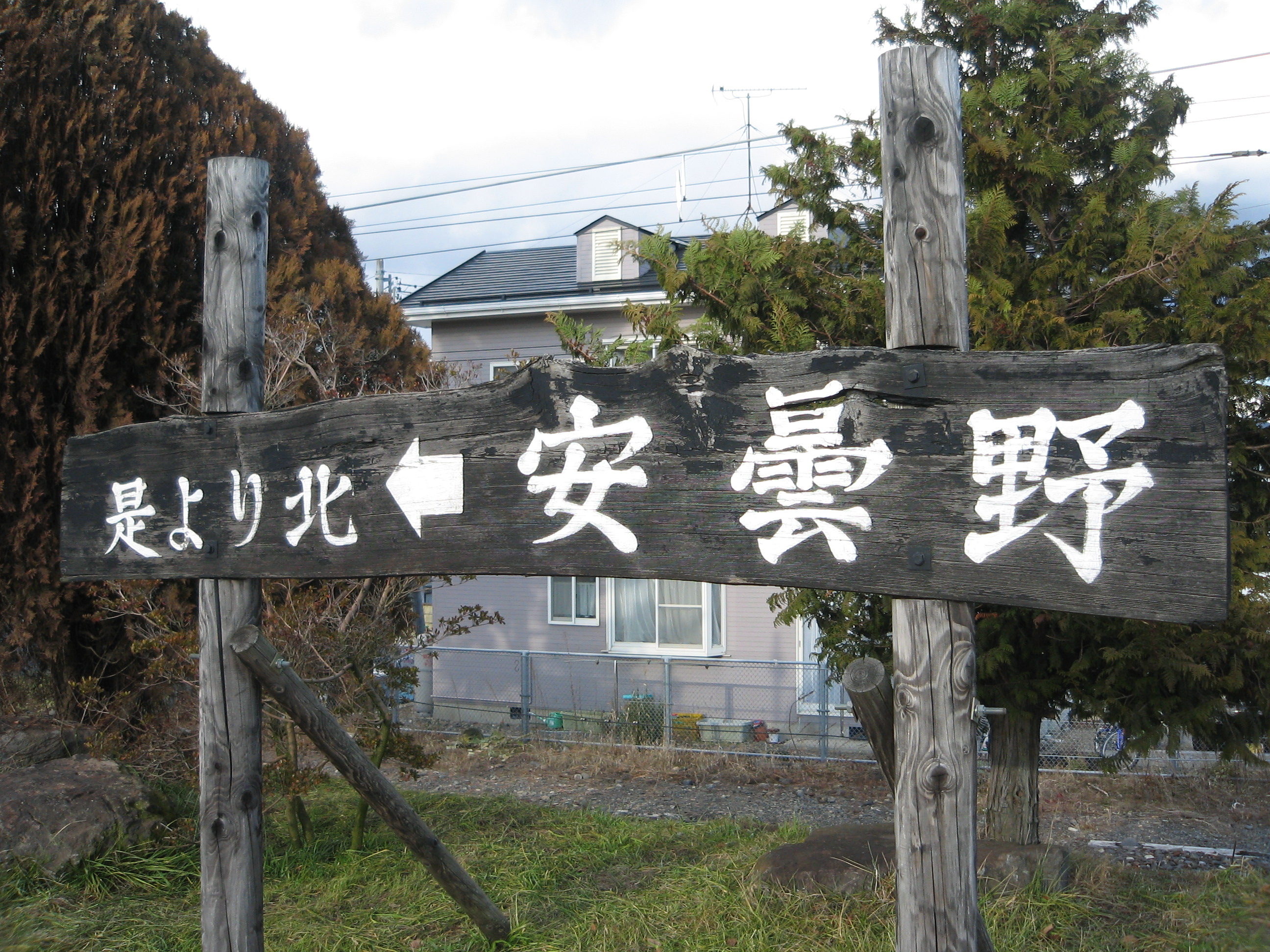
Azumidaira beyond this point

The station consists of one ground-level side platform serving a single bi-directional track, connected to the station building by a level crossing. The station is staffed.

== History ==
Azusabashi Station opened on 6 January 1915. With the privatization of Japanese National Railways (JNR) on 1 April 1987, the station came under the control of JR East. A new station building was completed in 2015.

== Passenger statistics ==
In fiscal 2015, the station was used by an average of 452 passengers daily (boarding passengers only).

== Surrounding area ==
- Azusa River

== See also ==
- List of railway stations in Japan
