= Nakagaya Station =

Railway station in Azumino, Nagano Prefecture, Japan

Ōito Line36 Nakagaya Station 中萱駅
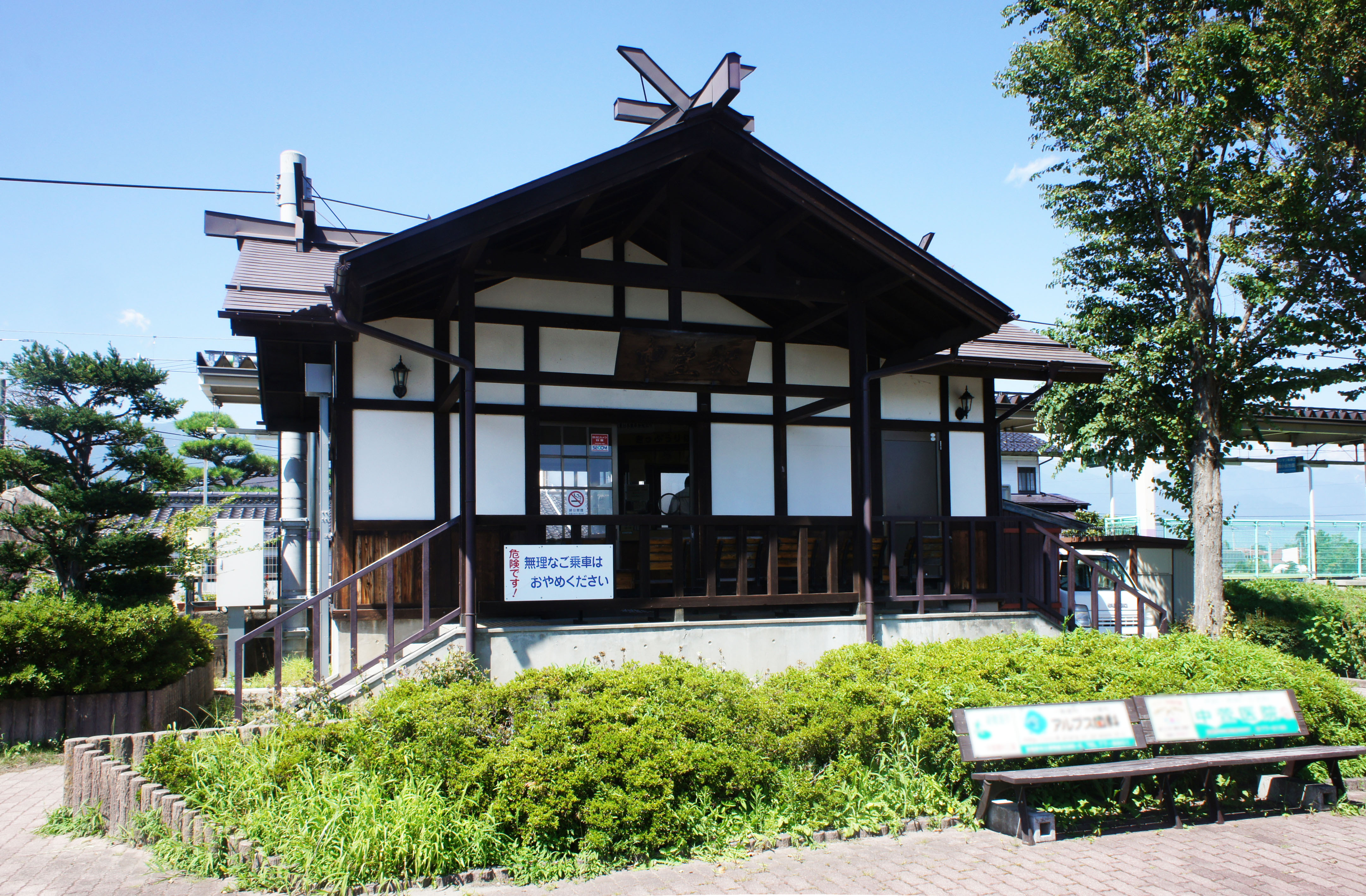
- Nakagaya Station in August 2021

General information
- Location: 2898-6 Misatomeisei, Azumino-shi, Nagano-ken 399-8101; Japan
- Coordinates: 36°16′24.52″N 137°54′11.25″E
- Elevation: 581.8 meters
- Operator: JR East
- Line: ■ Ōito Line
- Distance: 8.4 km from Matsumoto
- Platforms: 1 side platform

Other information
- Status: Staffed
- Station code: 36
- Website: Official website

History
- Opened: 30 May 1915

Passengers
- FY2015: 395

Services
Preceding station	JR East	Following station
Minami-Toyoshina One-way operation	Ōito Line Rapid	Hitoichiba 37 towards Matsumoto
Minami-Toyoshina 35 towards Minami-Otari	Ōito Line Local	Hitoichiba 37 towards Matsumoto
Location
- Location within Nagano Prefecture Location within Japan

Nakagaya Station (中萱駅, Nakagaya-eki) is a train station in the city of Azumino, Nagano Prefecture, Japan, operated by East Japan Railway Company (JR East).

== Lines ==
Nakagaya Station is served by the Ōito Line and is 8.4 kilometers from the starting point of the line at Matsumoto Station.

== Station layout ==
The station consists of one ground-level side platform serving a single bi-directional track. The station building is modelled after the Kasuke Shrine of the Jōkyō Gimin Memorial Museum. The station is a Kan'i itaku station.

== History ==
Nakagaya Station opened on 30 May 1915. With the privatization of Japanese National Railways (JNR) on 1 April 1987, the station came under the control of JR East. A new station building was completed in 2015.

== Passenger statistics ==
In fiscal 2015, the station was used by an average of 395 passengers daily (boarding passengers only).

== Surrounding area ==
- National Route 147
- Jōkyō Gimin Memorial Museum

== See also ==
- List of railway stations in Japan
