= Yoshimi Usui =

Japanese writer

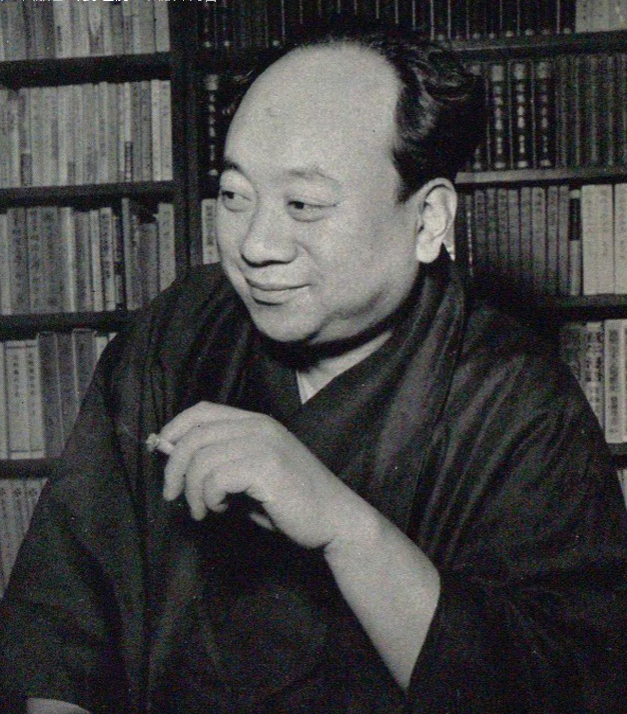
Yoshimi Usui

Yoshimi Usui (臼井 吉見, Usui Yoshimi; June 17, 1905 – July 12, 1987) was a Japanese writer and critic from Azumino, Nagano prefecture.

Usui won the 1974 10th Tanizaki Prize for Azumino (安曇野).

In 1977 he published a novelised account of Kawabata's death that led to a lawsuit against him by the Nobel Prize-winner's family.

== Selected works ==
- Hōjōki. Tsurezuregusa. Ichigon hōdanshu (方丈記. 徒然草. 一言 芳談集), Tōkyō : Chikuma Shobō, 1970.
- Hitotsu no kisetsu, 1975.
- Butai no ue de, 1976.
- Genjitsu no gyoshi, Tōkyo : Ie no Hikari Kyokai, 1976.
- Tsuchi to furusato no bungaku zenshū, 15 volumes, 1976–1977.
- Jikō no tenmatsu (事故のてんまつ), 1977.
- Jibun o tsukuru (自分 を つくる), Tōkyō : Chikuma Shobō, 1979.
- Shohan (初版), Tōkyō : Chikuma Shobō, 1985.
