= Shimpu-tōki =

Chorography collection of the Matsumoto Domain

Shimpu Toki 1884 cover

Shimpu-tōki (信府統記) is a chorography collection of the Matsumoto Domain in early modern Japan. It was compiled at the command of the domain lord of the Mizuno clan, and was written and edited by academics Suzuki Shigetaka and Mitsui Hiroatsu. Completed in 1724 (in the 9th year of the Kyōhō era during the Edo period), it covers the geography and history of the Matsumoto Domain and other areas in Shinano Province.

It was printed and published in 1884 (in the Meiji period), but the original has been lost.
