= E257 series =

Japanese train type

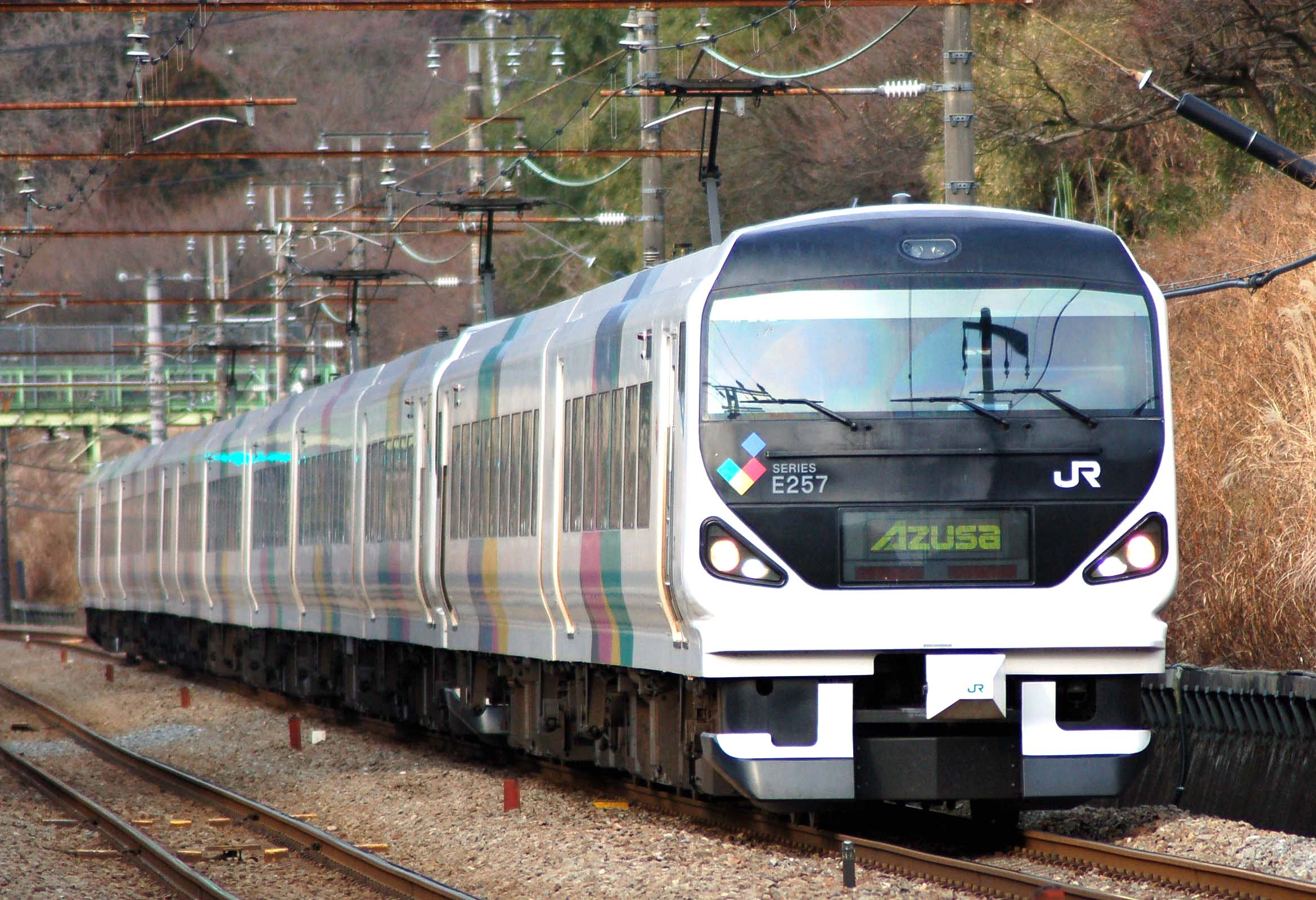
- An E257-0 series train on a Chuo Line Azusa service in January 2008
- In service: 2001–present
- Manufacturers: Hitachi, Kinki Sharyo, and Tokyu Car Corporation
- Family name: A-train
- Entered service: 1 December 2001
- Refurbished: 2019–
- Number built: 249 vehicles (5 × 2-car, 19 × 5-car, 16 × 9-car)
- Number in service: 239 vehicles
- Number scrapped: 10 vehicles (5 sets)
- Formation: 5/9 cars per trainset Formerly: 2 cars per trainset
- Operator: JR East

Specifications
- Car length: 21,000 mm (68 ft 11 in) (end cars); 20,500 mm (67 ft 3 in) (intermediate cars)
- Doors: 2 per side
- Maximum speed: 130 km/h (81 mph)
- Traction system: IGBT–VVVF (Mitsubishi Electric)
- Traction motors: 3-phase AC squirrel-cage induction motors (Mitsubishi Electric)
- Acceleration: 0.56 m/s^{2} (1.3 mph/s)
- Deceleration: 1.4 m/s^{2} (3.1 mph/s)
- Electric systems: 1,500 V DC overhead catenary
- Current collection: Pantograph
- Braking systems: Regenerative brake, electronically controlled pneumatic brakes, snow-resistant brake
- Safety systems: ATS-SN, ATS-P
- Track gauge: 1,067 mm (3 ft 6 in)

Notes/references
- Details in this infobox apply to the E257 series as a whole. Subseries-specific details can be found in their respective sections.

The E257 series (E257系, E257-kei) is a DC electric multiple unit (EMU) train type operated in Japan for limited express services by East Japan Railway Company (JR East) and built jointly by Hitachi, Kinki Sharyo, and Tokyu Car Corporation.

== Variants ==
- E257-0 series: Azusa, Kaiji
- E257-500 series: Sazanami, Wakashio, Shiosai, Ayame
- E257-2000/-2500 series: Odoriko, Shōnan
- E257-5000 series: additional services
- E257-5500 series: Akagi, Kusatsu/Shima

Four variants exist: the original E257-0 series for use on Chūō Main Line Azusa and Kaiji limited-express services until 16 March 2019 (displaced by E353 series EMUs), the E257-500 series for use on Chiba area limited express services (Uchibo Line Sazanami, Sotobo Line Wakashio, Sōbu Main Line Shiosai, and Narita and Kashima Lines Ayame), the E257-2000/-2500 used for Odoriko services modified from former E257-0 and -500 series trains, and the E257-5000/5500 from former E257-0 and -500 trains for use on additional and charter services.

== E257-0 series ==
E257-0 series
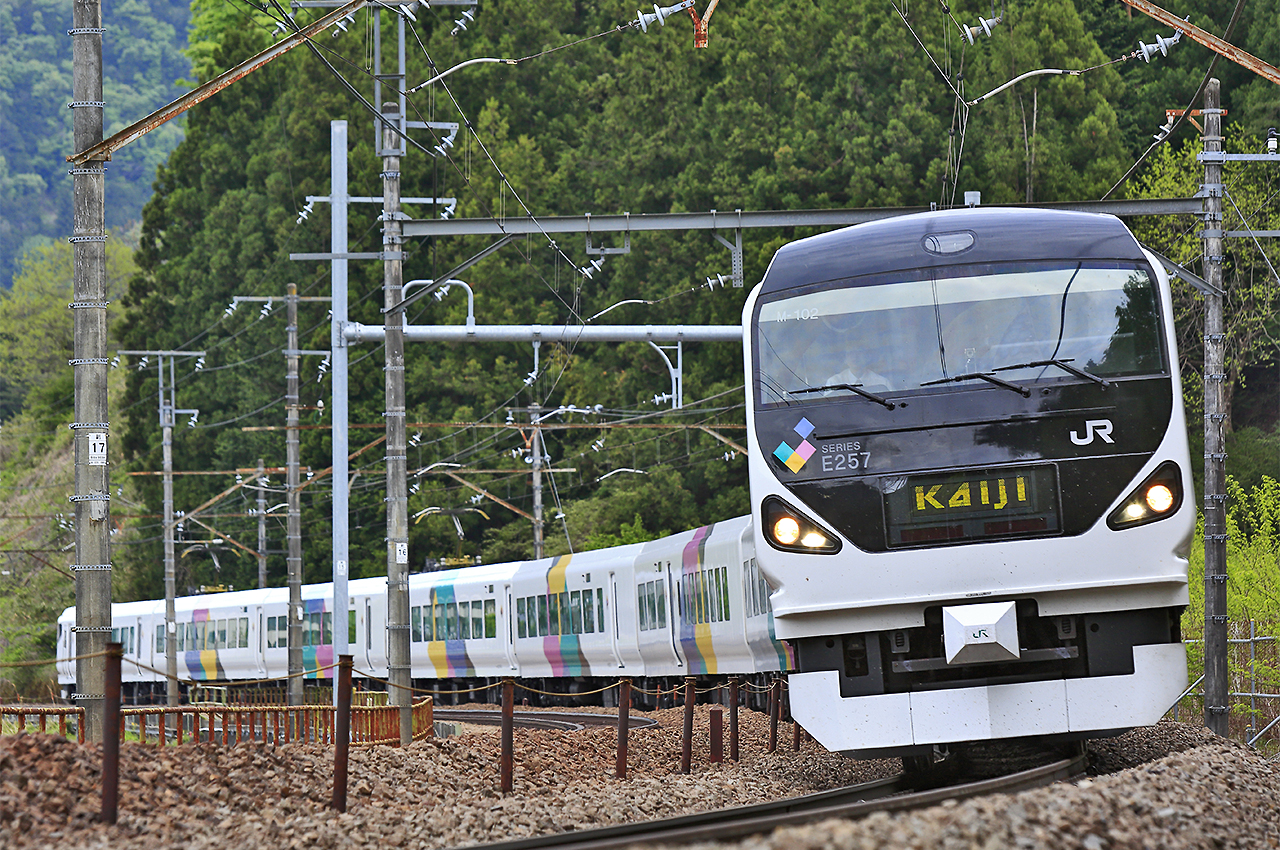
- E257-0 series set on a Kaiji service
- In service: 2001–2019
- Replaced: 183/189 series
- Number built: 154 vehicles (16 × 9-car; 5 × 2-car)
- Number in service: None
- Number scrapped: 10 vehicles (5 sets)
- Successor: E353 series
- Formation: 2 or 9 cars per trainset
- Fleet numbers: M101–M116 (9-car sets); M201–M205 (2-car sets)
- Depot: Matsumoto
- Lines served: Chuo Main Line; Oito Line; Shinonoi Line; Tokaido Main Line (until 2008)

Specifications
- Multiple working: Within subtype

Notes/references
- This train won the 45th Blue Ribbon Award in 2002.

This sub-series was introduced on 1 December 2001 to replace the aging 183 and 189 series rolling stock on Chuo Main Line Azusa and Kaiji services. Based at Matsumoto depot, the fleet consisted of sixteen 9-car sets (M101 to M116) with a full cab at the Matsumoto end and a gangwayed cab at the Tokyo end, and five 2-car "add-on" sets (M201 to M205) with a full cab at the Tokyo end and a shunting cab at the Matsumoto end.

The type was the recipient of the 45th Blue Ribbon Award (2002) of the Japan Railfan Club.

From 2018, the E257 series trains were replaced by E353 series EMUs on Chuo Main Line Azusa and Kaiji limited express services. From the start of the revised timetable on 16 March 2019, E257 series trains were no longer used on regular Chuo Main Line limited express services. The trains were modified into E257-2000 series trainsets and redeployed on Tokaido Main Line Odoriko services from 14 March 2020. Several sets are still under refurbishment and three sets, which were reserved for use on charter and extra services, were modified into E257-5000s. As a result of these conversions, the five 2-car "add-on" sets were deemed surplus and therefore scrapped.

=== Operations ===
==== Former operations ====
- Chūō Main Line, Shinonoi Line, and Oito Line
  - Azusa: Chiba – Tokyo – Shinjuku – Matsumoto – Minamiotari
  - Kaiji: Tokyo – Shinjuku – Kōfu – Ryūō
  - Chūō Liner: Tokyo – Shinjuku – Hachiōji – Takao (now replaced by Ltd. Express Hachioji)
  - Ōme Liner: Tokyo – Shinjuku – Tachikawa – Ōme (now replaced by Ltd. Express Ōme)
  - Rapid service (no additional charge required): Matsumoto – Nagano

Matsumoto-based E257 series trains were also used on the Ohayo Liner Shinjuku and Home Liner Odawara commuter services running on the Tokaido Main Line until 14 March 2008.

=== Formations ===
The nine-car sets (M101 to M116) were formed as follows.

Car No.	3	4	5	6	7	8	9	10	11
Designation	Tc	M	M'	M	T	Ts	M	M'	Tc'
Numbering	KuHa E257-100	MoHa E257	MoHa E256	MoHa E257-1000	SaHa E257	SaRoHa E257	MoHa E257-100	MoHa E256-100	KuHa E256

- Cars 4, 6, and 9 were each fitted with one PS37 single-arm pantograph.

The two-car sets (M201 to M205) were formed as follows.

Car No.	1	2
Designation	Tc	Mc
Numbering	KuHa E257	KuMoHa E257

- Car 2 was fitted with one PS37 single-arm pantograph.
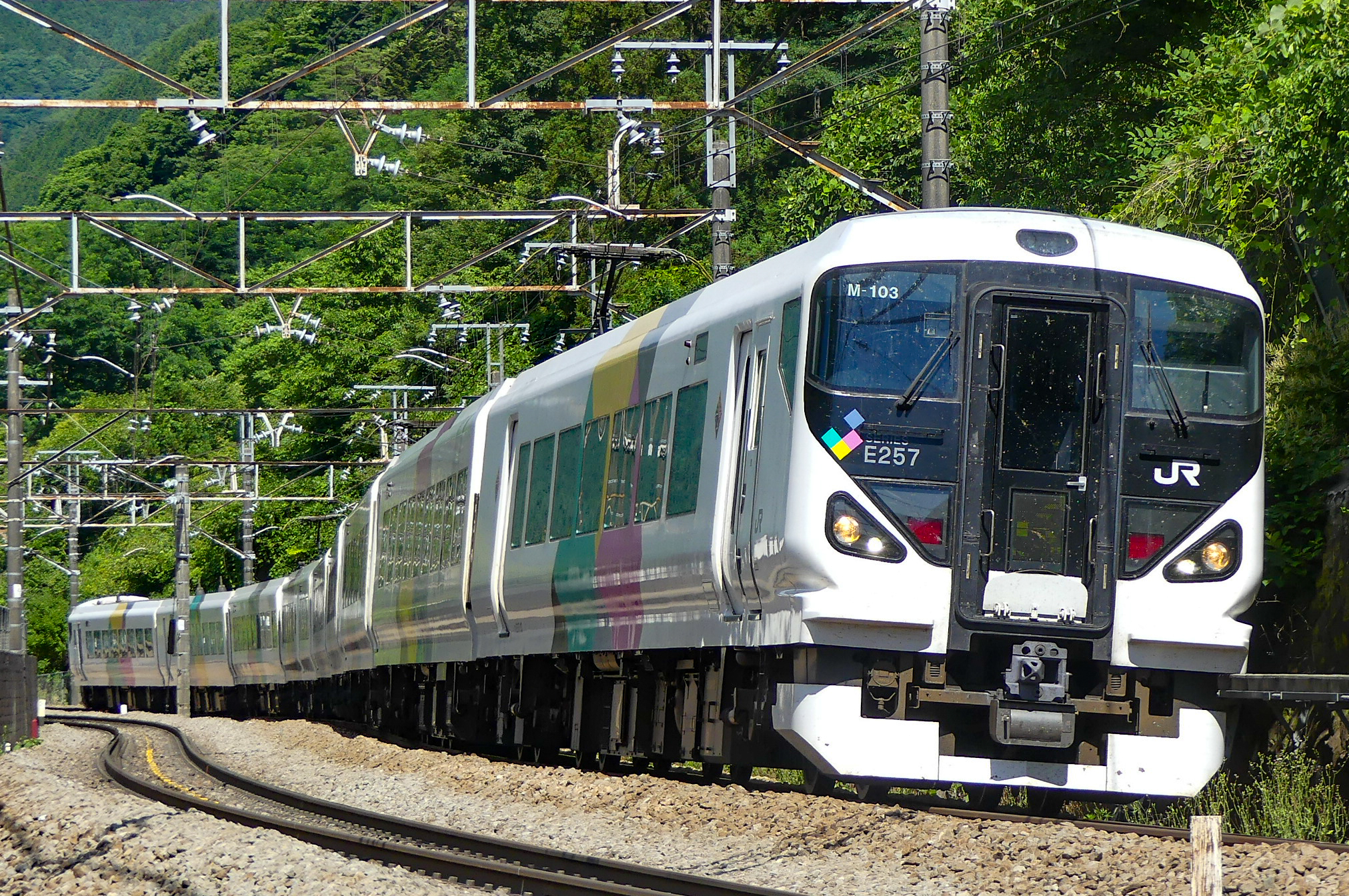
A 9-car set on a Kaiji service, with a gangwayed KuHa E257-100 car leading

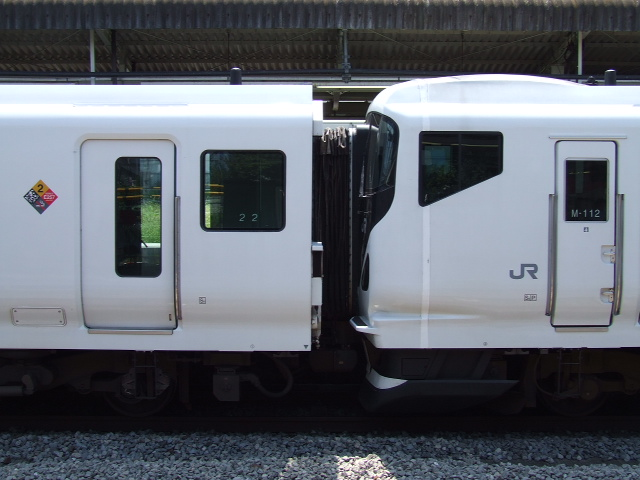
The gangway connection between a KuMoHa E257 car (left) and KuHa E257 car (right)

=== Interior ===
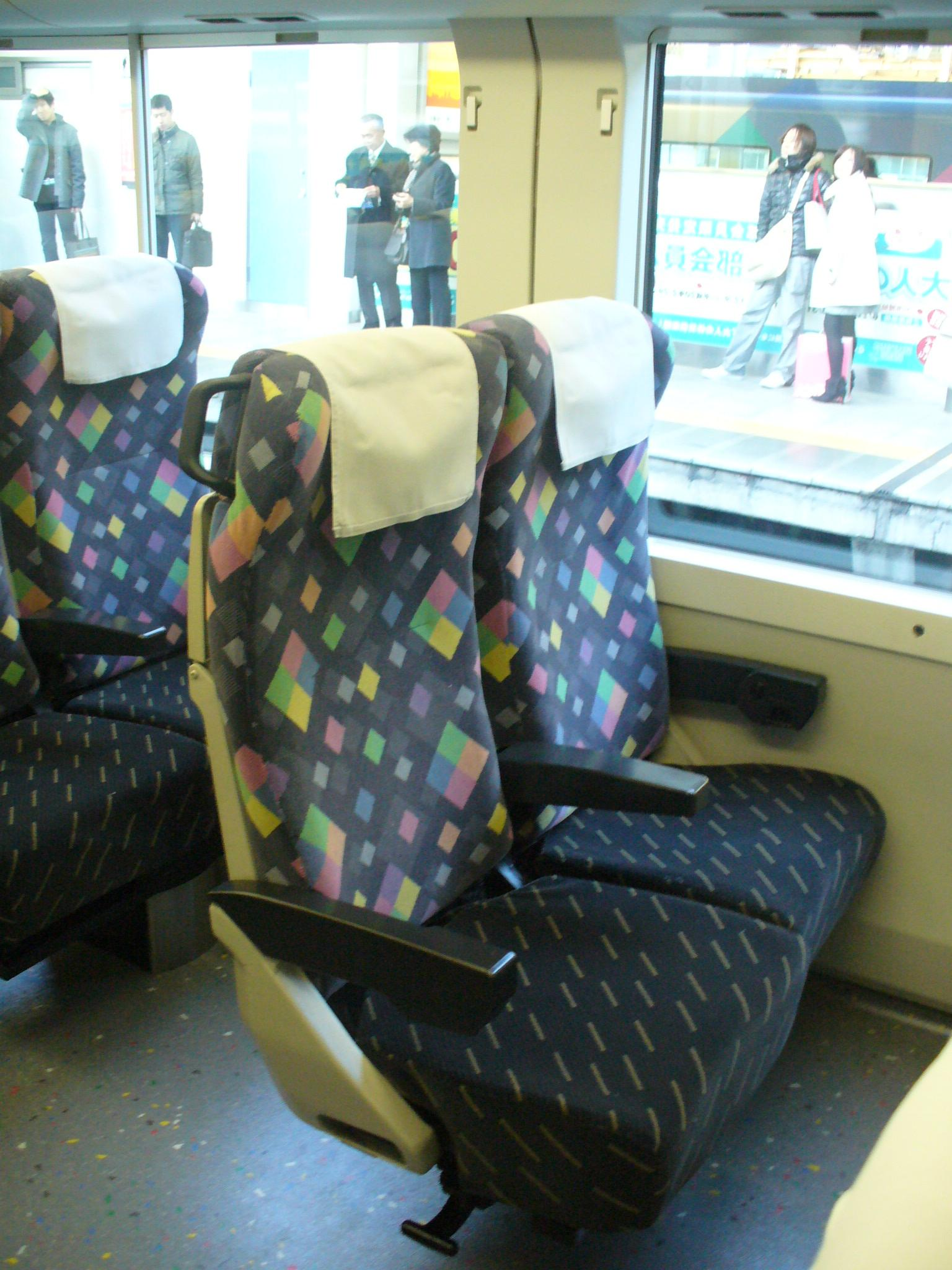
Standard class seating (2+2)

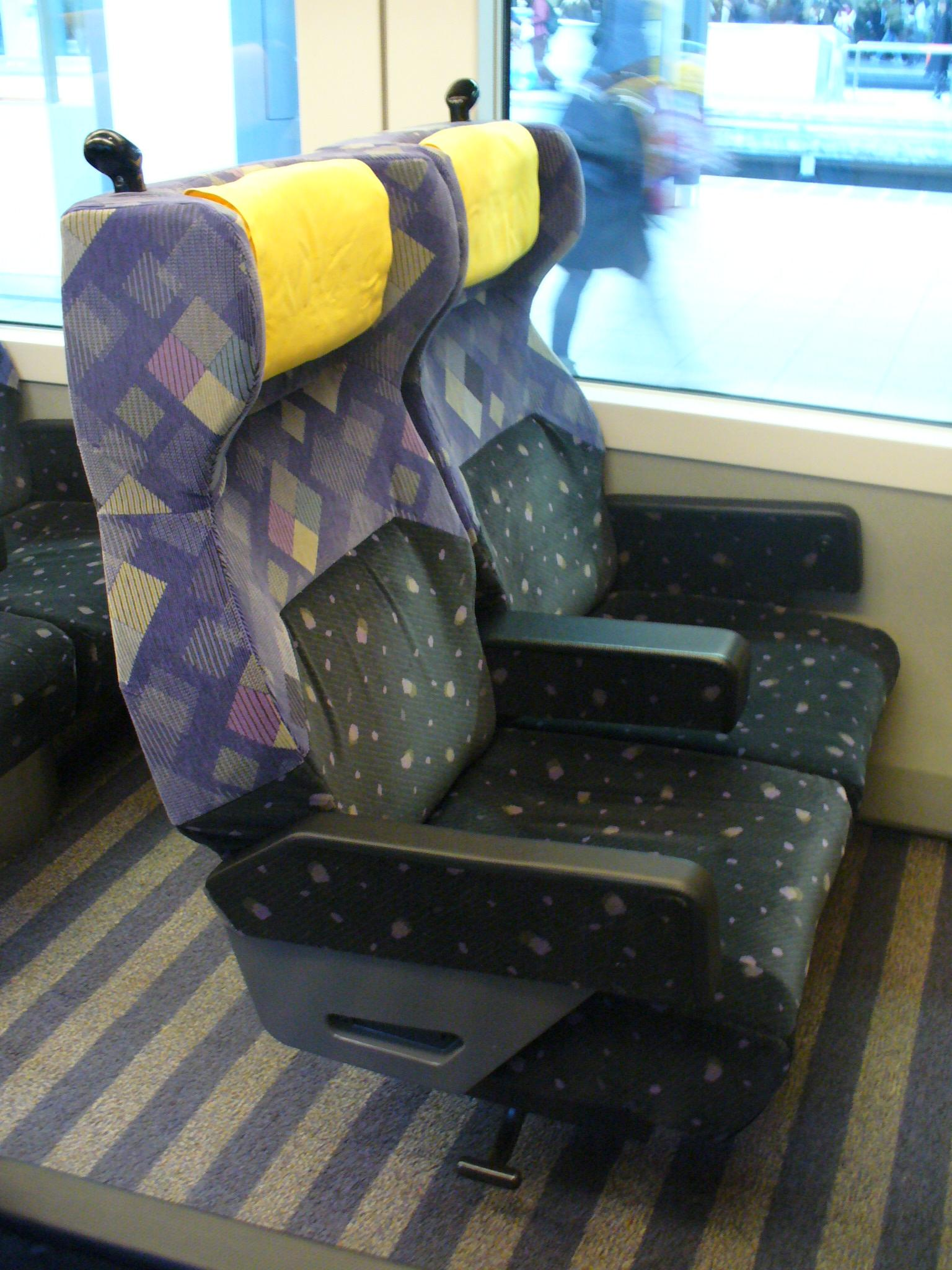
Green class seating (2+2)

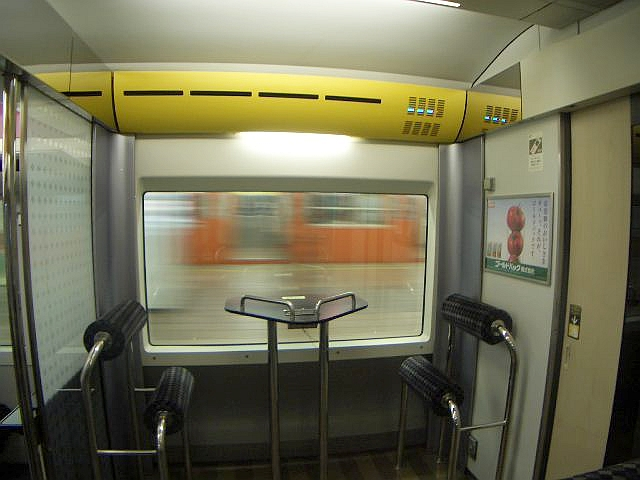
Mini-lounge area in car 9, previously a smoking area (until March 2007)

== E257-500 series ==
E257-500 series
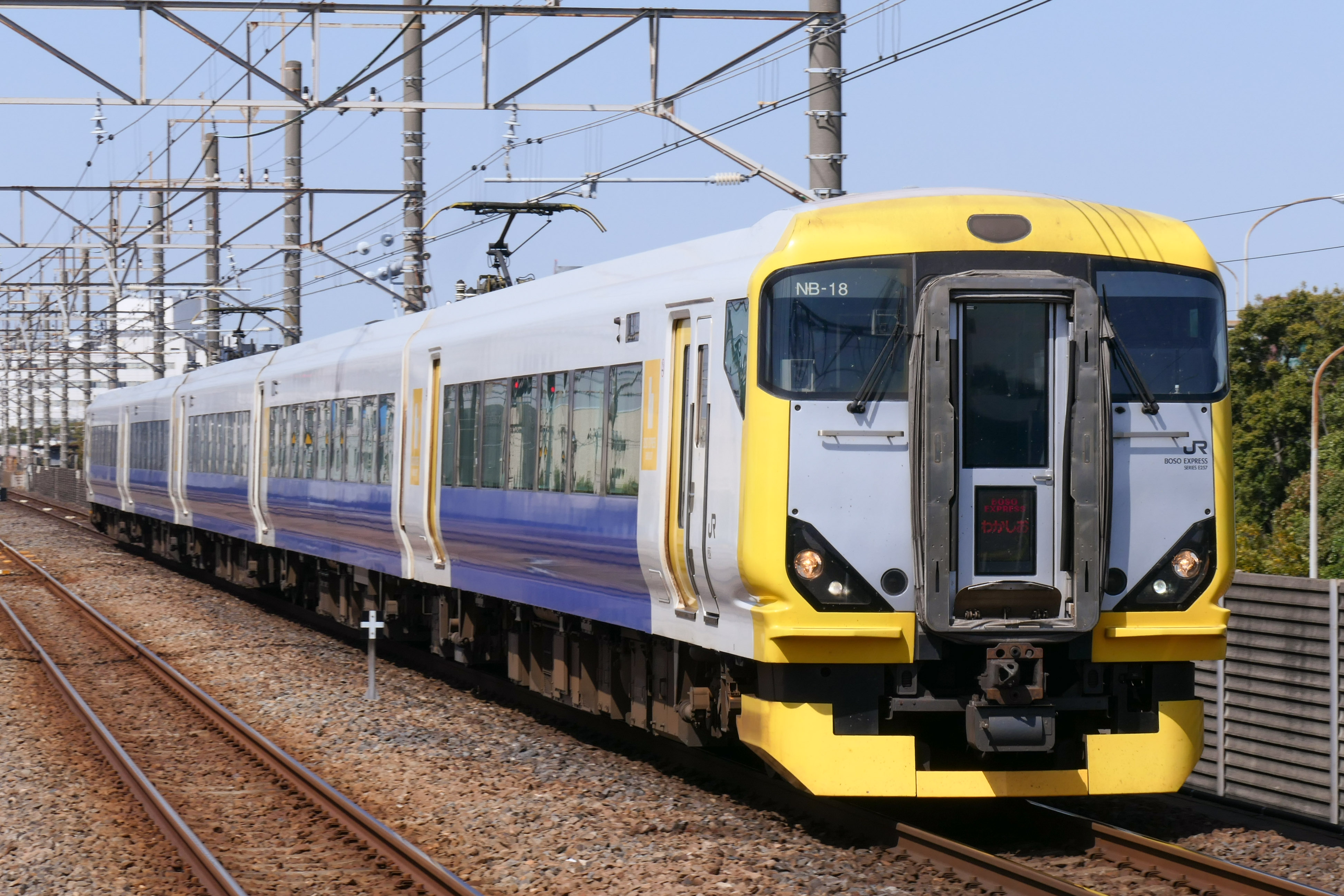
- E257-500 series set NB18
- In service: 2004–present
- Replaced: 183 series
- Constructed: 2004–2005
- Number built: 95 vehicles (19 sets)
- Number in service: 50 vehicles (10 sets)
- Formation: 5 cars per trainset
- Fleet numbers: NB01–NB19
- Depot: Makuhari
- Lines served: Keiyō Line; Uchibo Line; Sotobo Line; Sobu Main Line; Narita Line; Kashima Line; Fujikyuko Line

Specifications
- Multiple working: Within subtype

The E257-500 sub-series version was delivered between July 2004 and October 2005, with the first sets entering service from 16 October 2004 on Uchibo Line Sazanami and Sotobo Line Wakashio limited-express services, replacing older 183 series rolling stock. Based at Makuhari depot in Chiba Prefecture, the fleet consists of 19 five-car sets (NB01 to NB19). Unlike the Chūō Line variant, these sets have gangways at both ends.

Due to the reduction of the Chiba area limited express services, several trains are being used for the Chuo and Fujikyuko Line Fuji Excursion services and other charter and extra services. In addition to these, 4 sets were planned for conversion into E257-2500 to be used on Tōkaidō Main Line Odoriko limited express services, with further 5 sets to be converted to E257-5500 for use on additional services.

=== Formation ===
The five-car E257-500 series sets (NB01 to NB19) are formed as follows.

Car No.	1	2	3	4	5
Designation	Tc'	M	M'	M	Tc
Numbering	KuHa E256-500	MoHa E257-1500	MoHa E256-500	MoHa E257-500	KuHa E257-500

Cars 2 and 4 are each fitted with one PS37 single-arm pantograph.

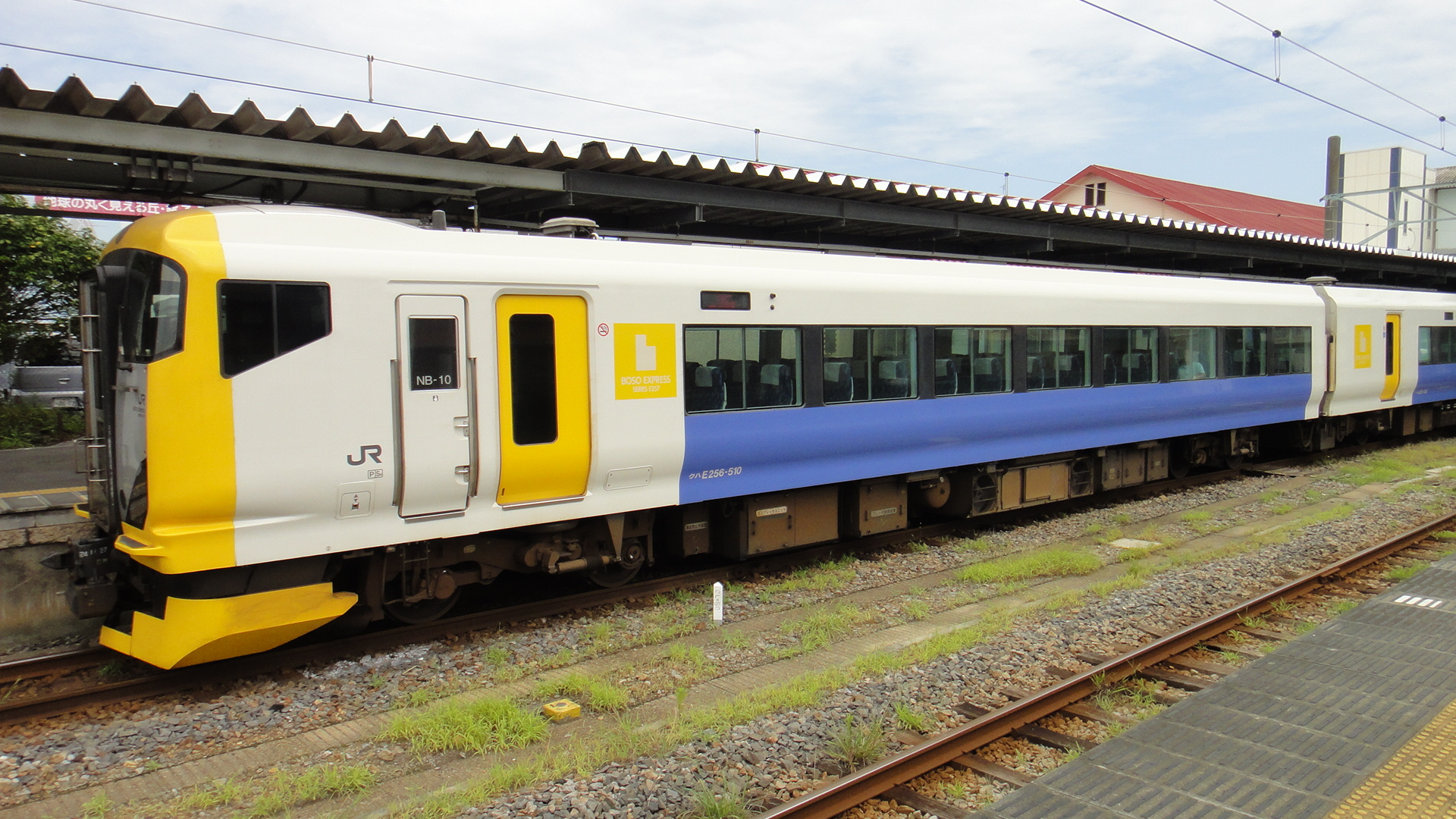
KuHa E256-500

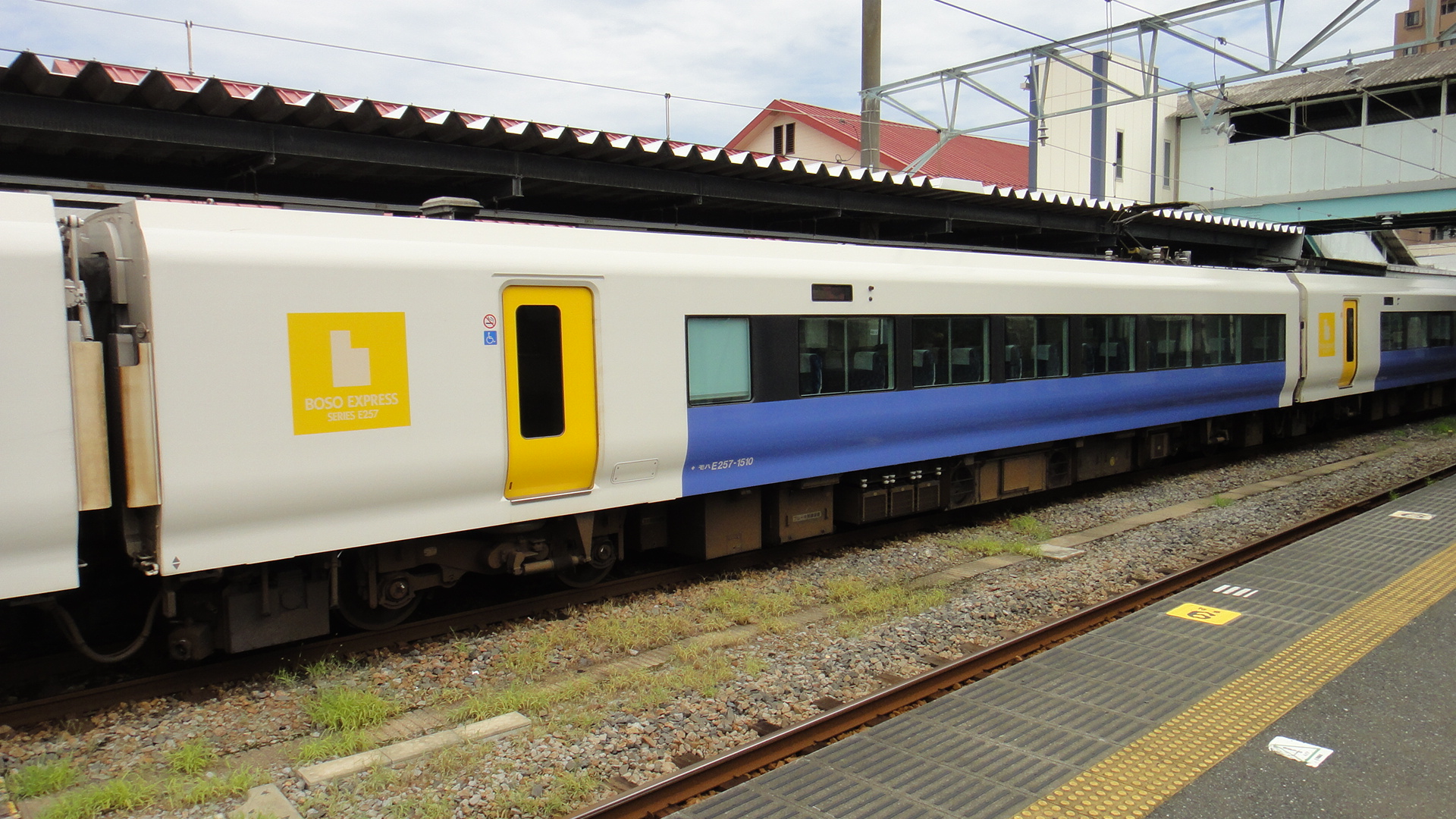
MoHa E257-1500

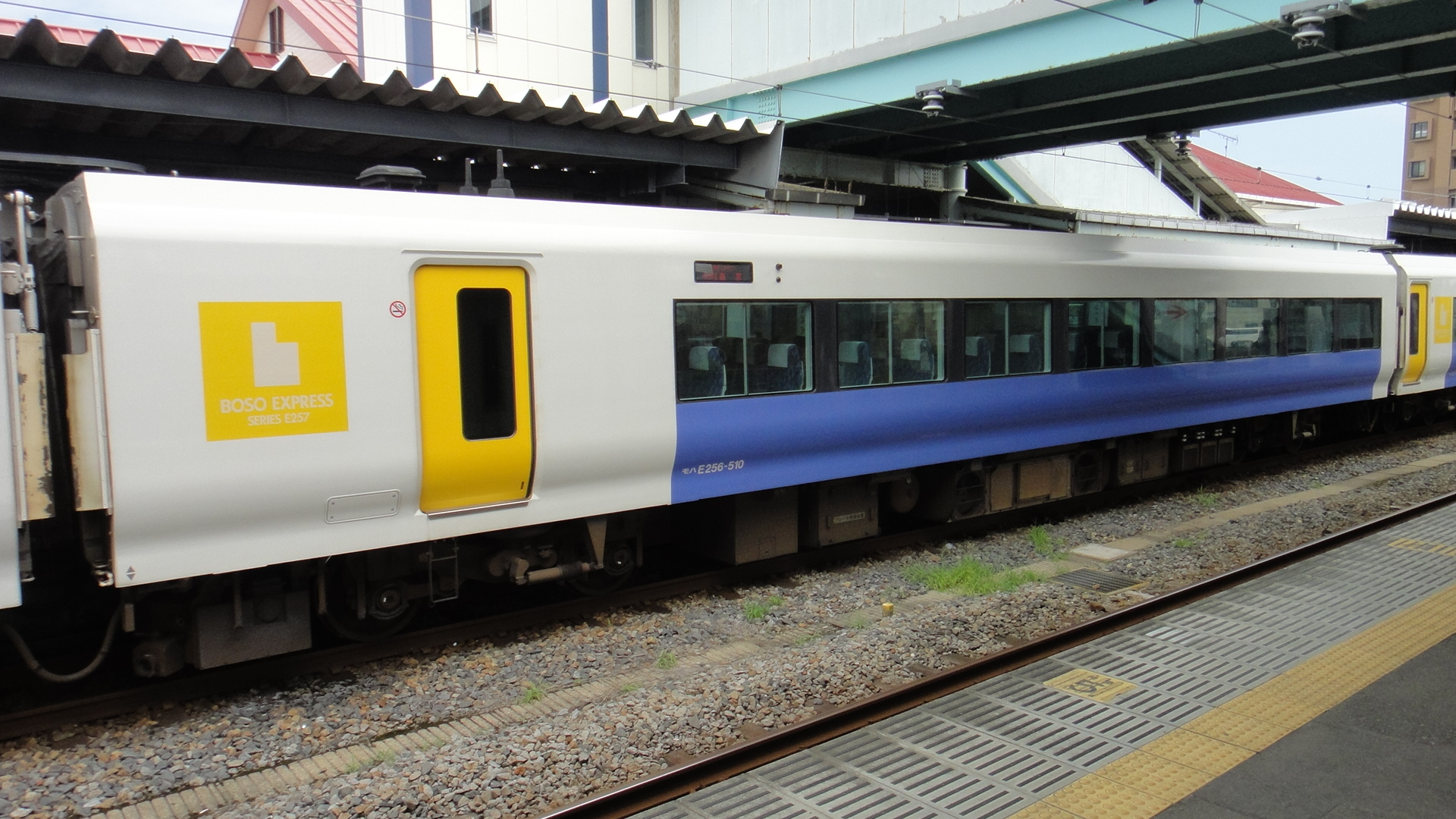
MoHa E256-500

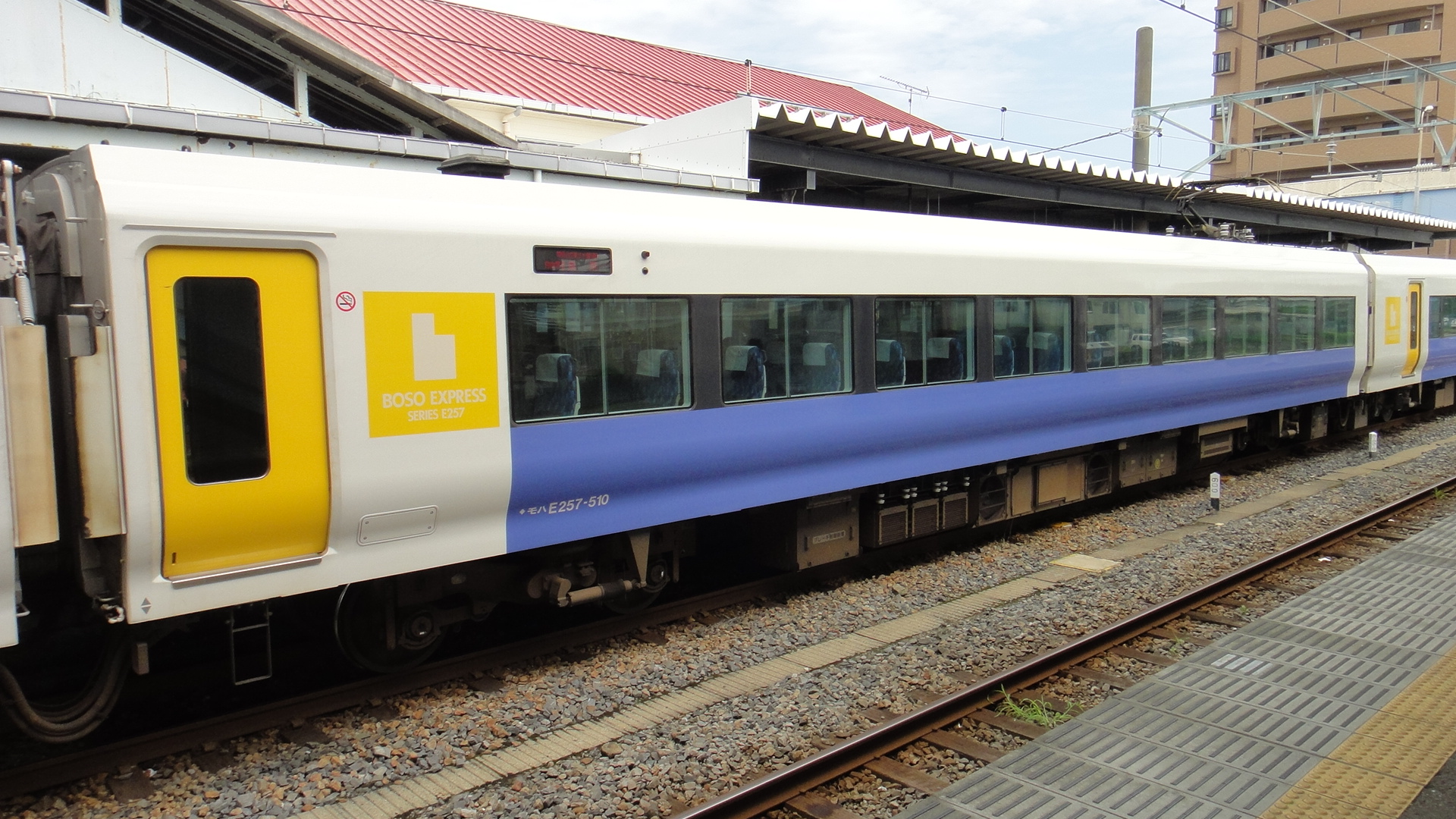
MoHa E257-500

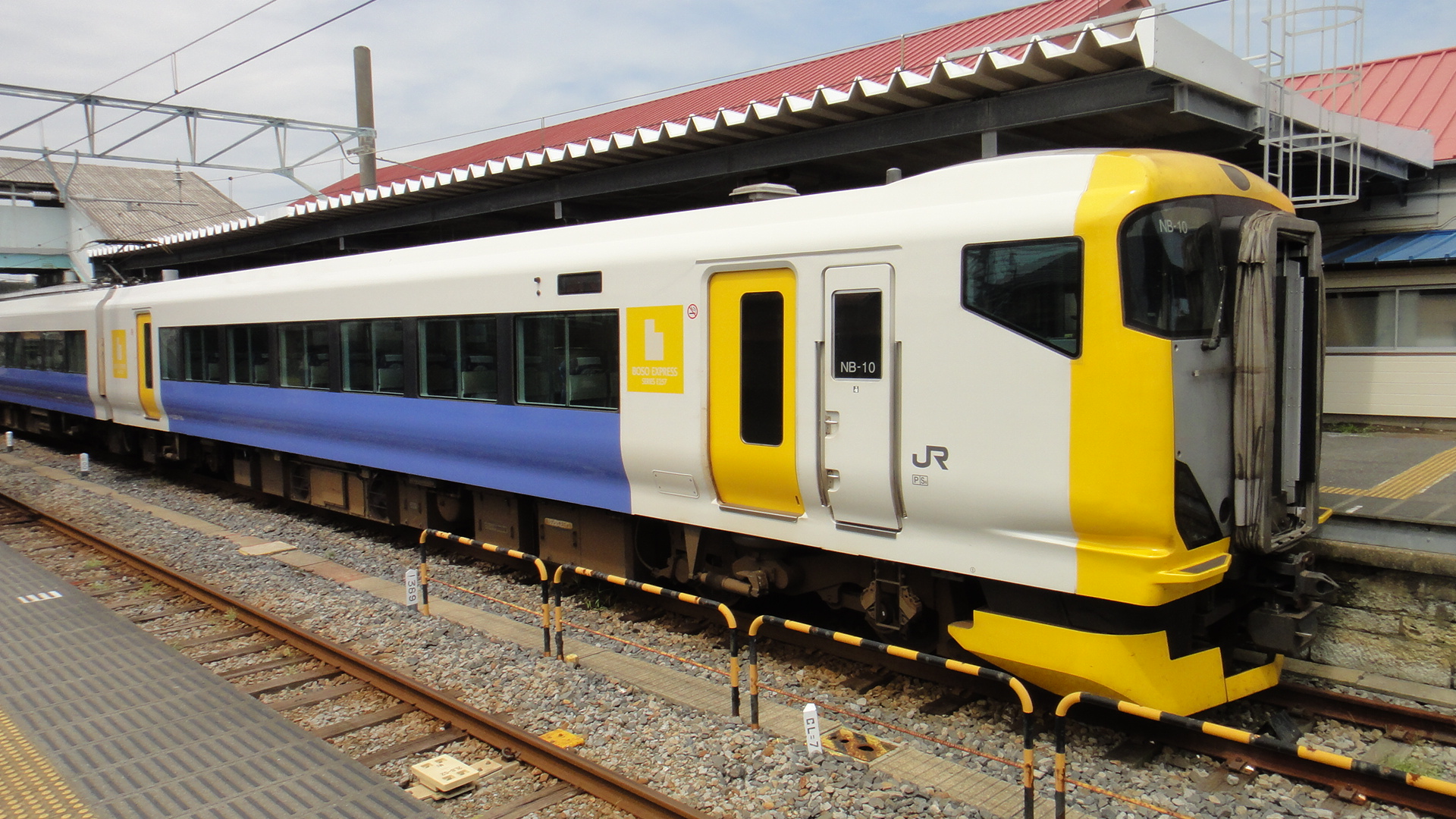
KuHa E257-500

=== Services operated ===
- Uchibo Line
  - Sazanami: Tokyo – Tateyama
- Sotobo Line
  - Wakashio: Tokyo – Katsuura – Awa-Kamogawa
- Sobu Main Line
  - Shiosai: (Shinjuku) – Tokyo – Chōshi
  - Ayame (discontinued): Tokyo – Narita – Chōshi
- Yokosuka Line
  - Ohayo Liner Zushi (discontinued): Zushi – Tokyo
  - Home Liner Zushi (discontinued): Tokyo – Zushi

=== Interior ===
The E257-500 series sets are mono-class, with standard-class accommodation only.

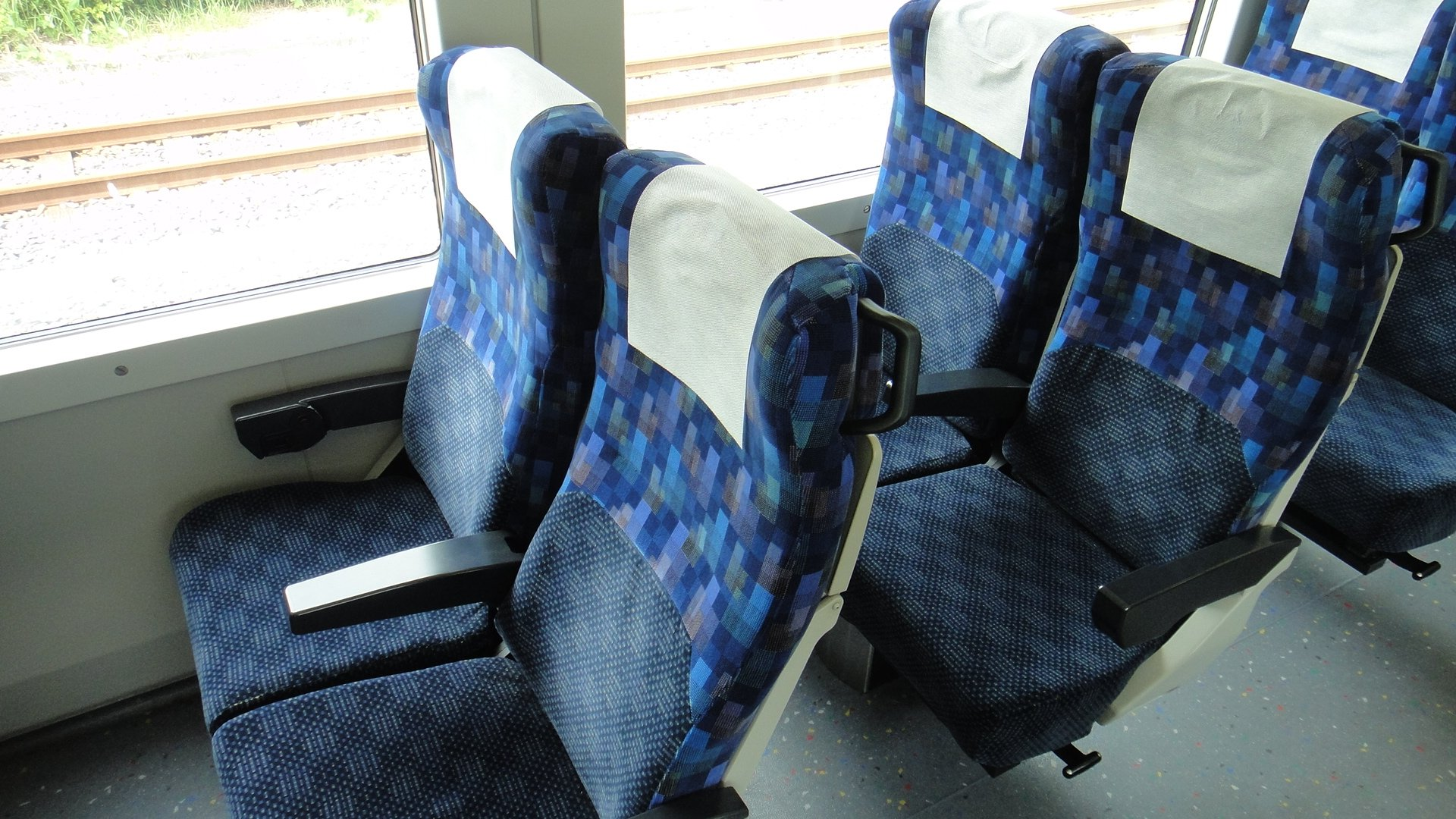
E257-500 series standard-class seating in August 2011

== E257-2000/2500 series ==
E257-2000/2500 series
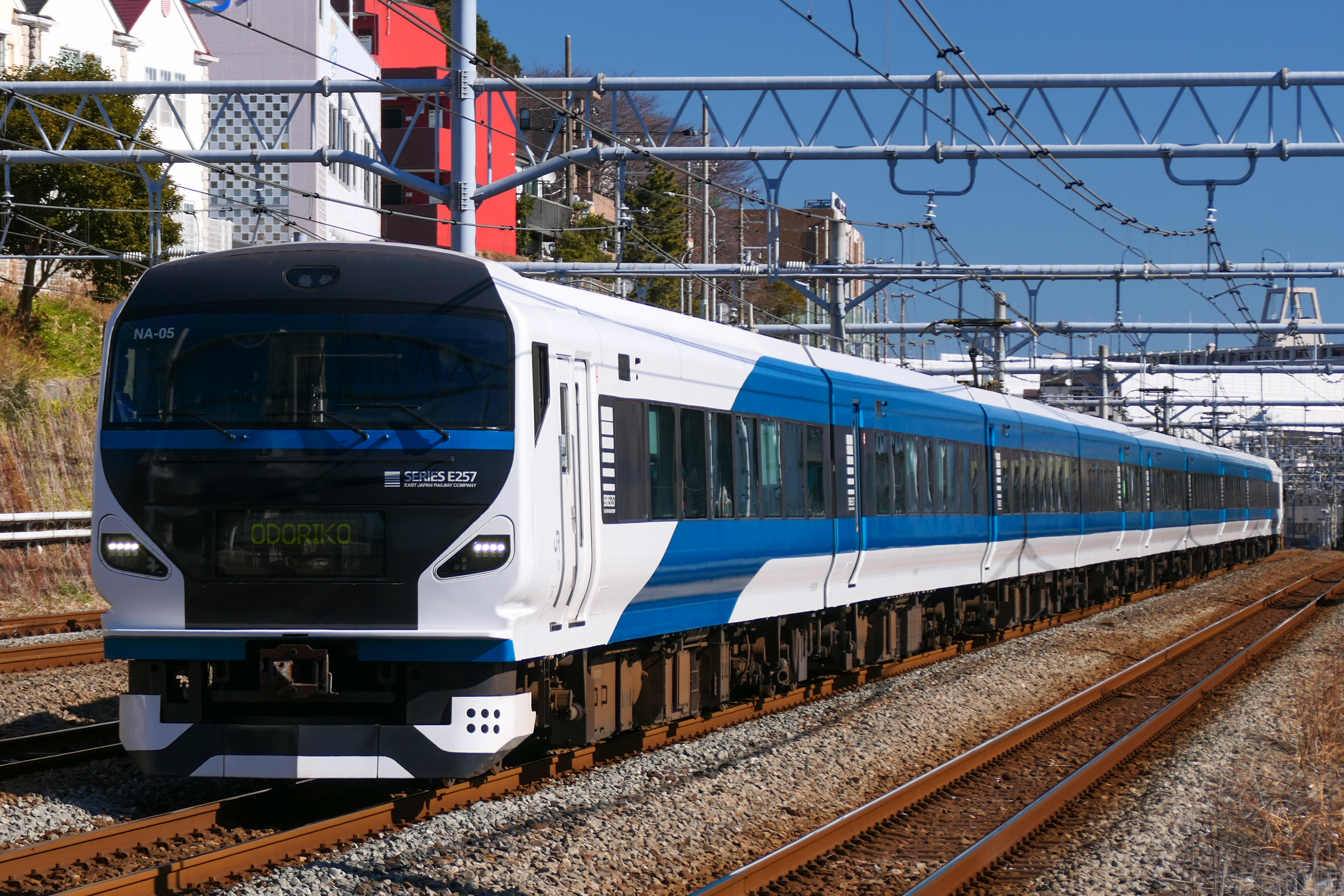
- E257-2000 series set on an Odoriko service

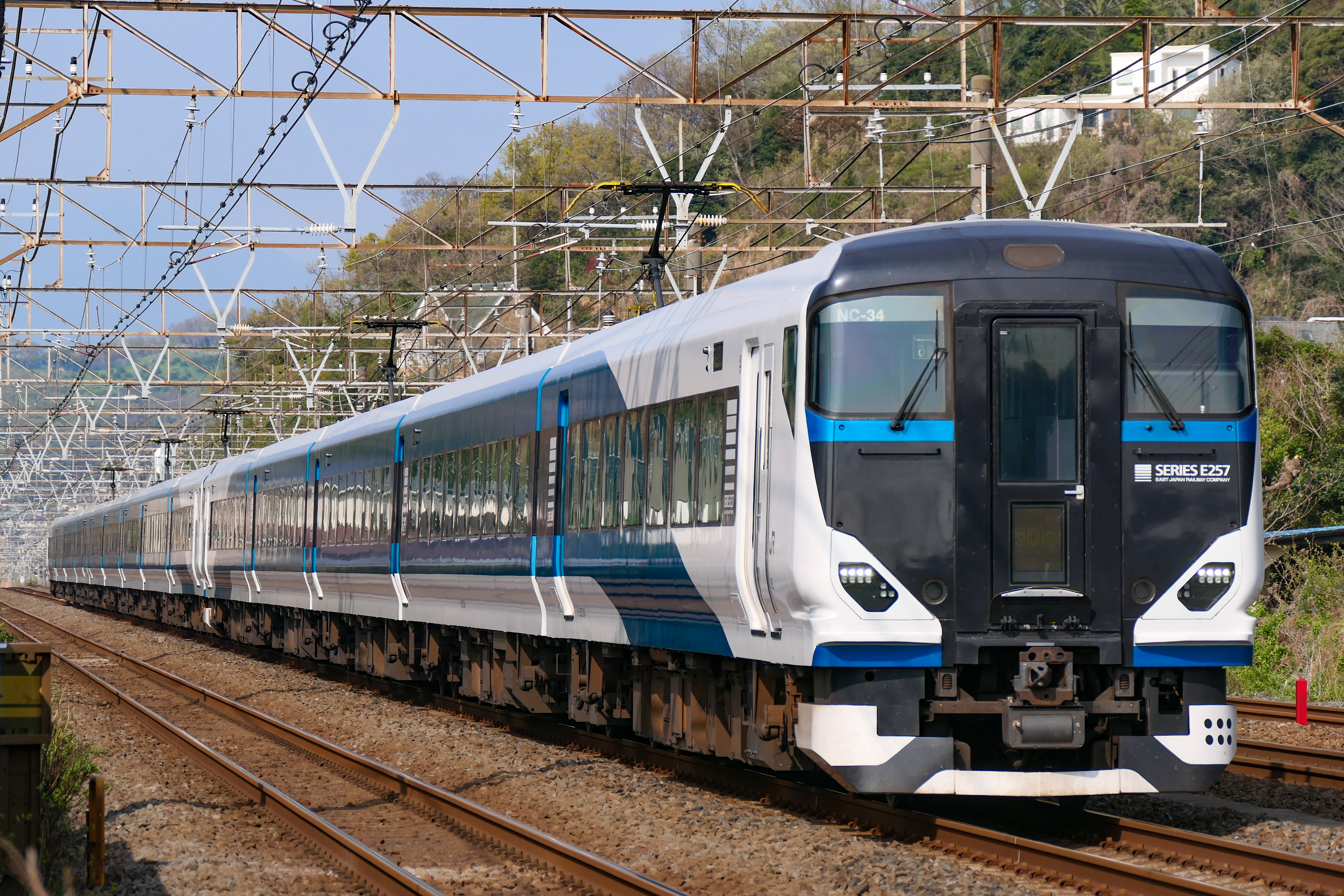
- E257-2500 series set NC-34
- In service: 2020–present
- Replaced: 185 series
- Number in service: 137 vehicles (13 × 9-car, 4 × 5-car)
- Formation: 9 cars per 2000 subseries set; 5 cars per 2500 subseries set
- Fleet numbers: NA-01 – NA-05 (2000 subseries); NC-31 – NC-34 (2500 subseries)
- Depot: Omiya
- Lines served: Tokaido Main Line; Ito Line; Izu Kyuko Line

The E257-2000 and -2500 series are refurbished versions of the E257-0 and -500 series respectively, intended for use on Odoriko limited express services on the Tōkaidō Main Line. As of 1 April 2022, the fleet consists of thirteen 9-car E257-2000 sets, numbered NA-01 to NA-13, and four 5-car E257-2500 sets, numbered NC-31 to NC-34, based at Omiya depot.

The refurbishment was largely based on the "Peninsula Blue" concept, which is inspired by the colours of the sky and sea of the Izu Peninsula. Internally, the sets received several improvements, including toilets, increased luggage capacity, improved lighting, and new flooring.

The first E257-2000 set, converted from E257-0 set M112 at Nagano General Rolling Stock Centre, was delivered to Omiya in March 2019. On 14 March 2020, two round-trips of the formerly 185 series-operated Odoriko services were replaced by E257-2000s. Since 13 March 2021, these sets have been used across all Odoriko services, excluding the Saphir Odoriko. On 15 March of that year, the E257-2000/2500 series sets were introduced on the Shōnan limited express.

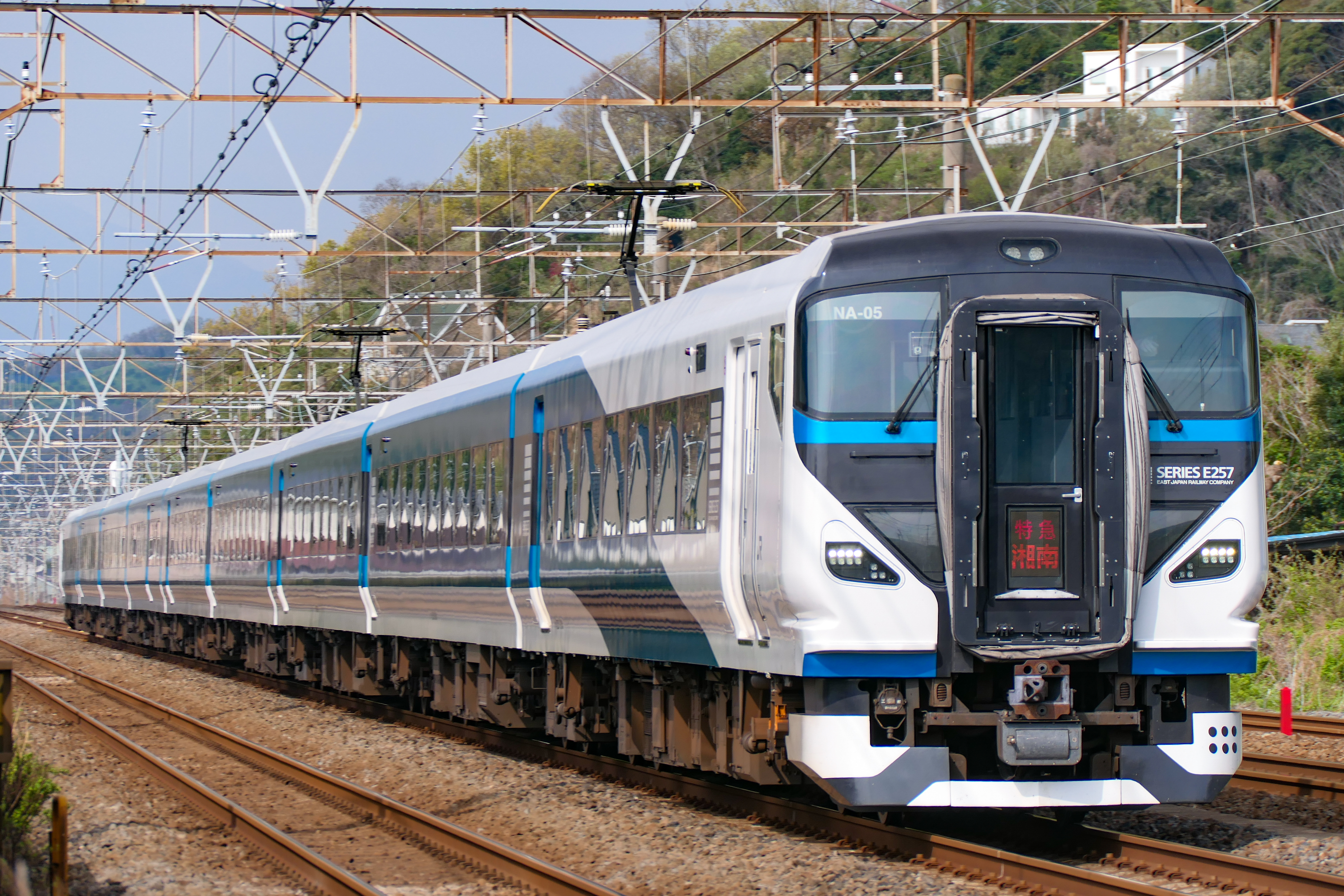
Gangwayed end of E257-2000 series set NA-05

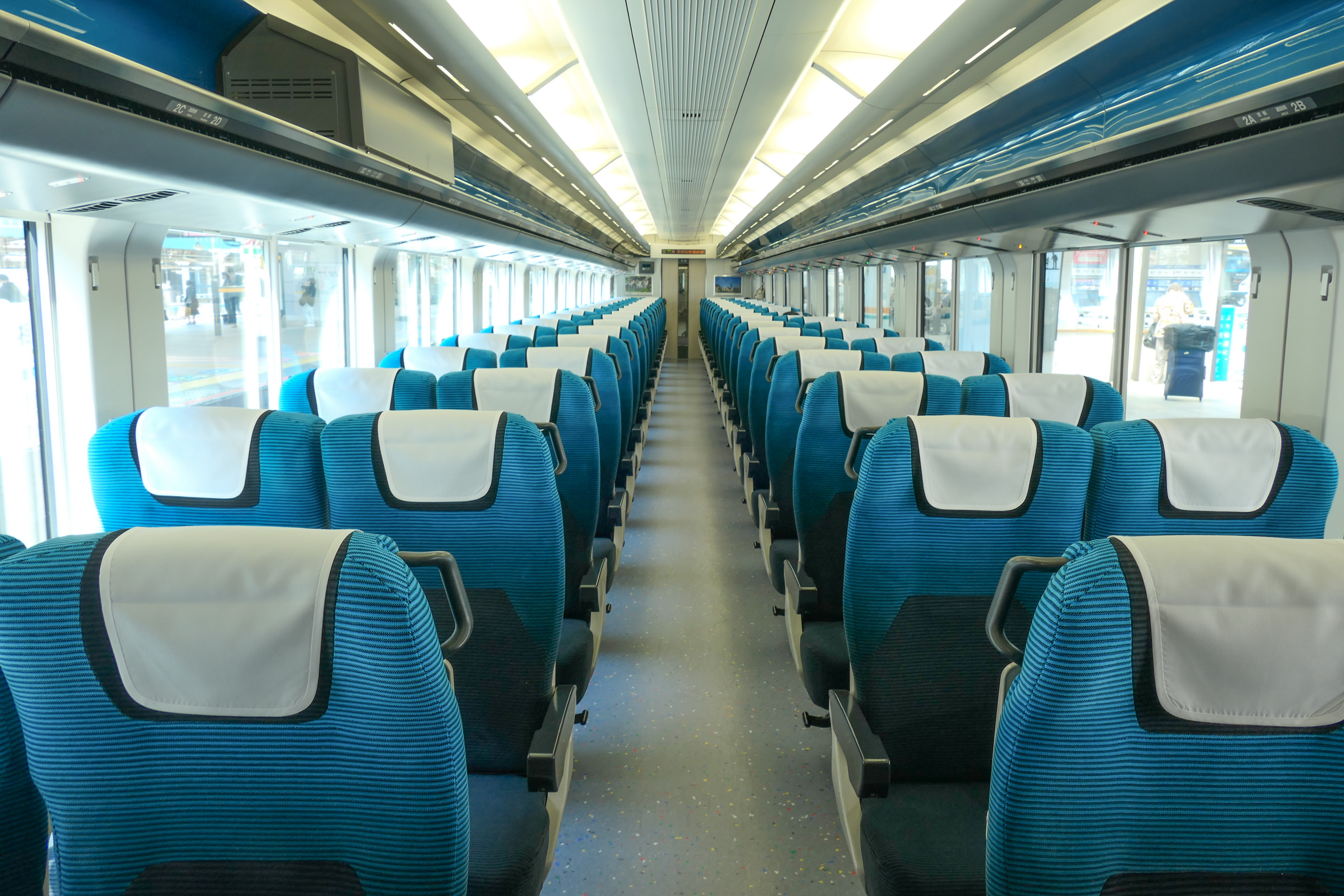
Standard-class interior

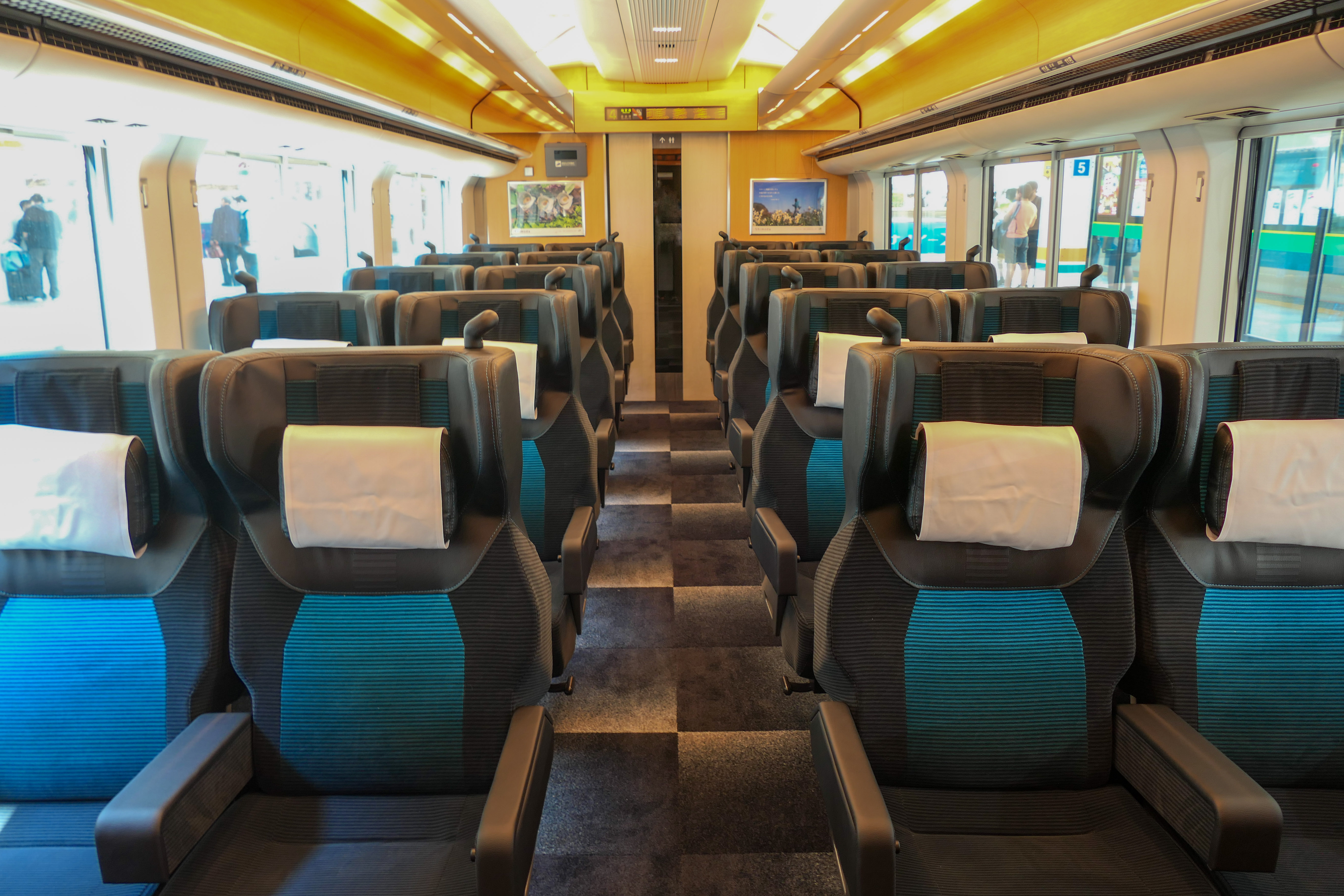
Green car interior

== E257-5000/5500 series ==
E257-5000/5500 series
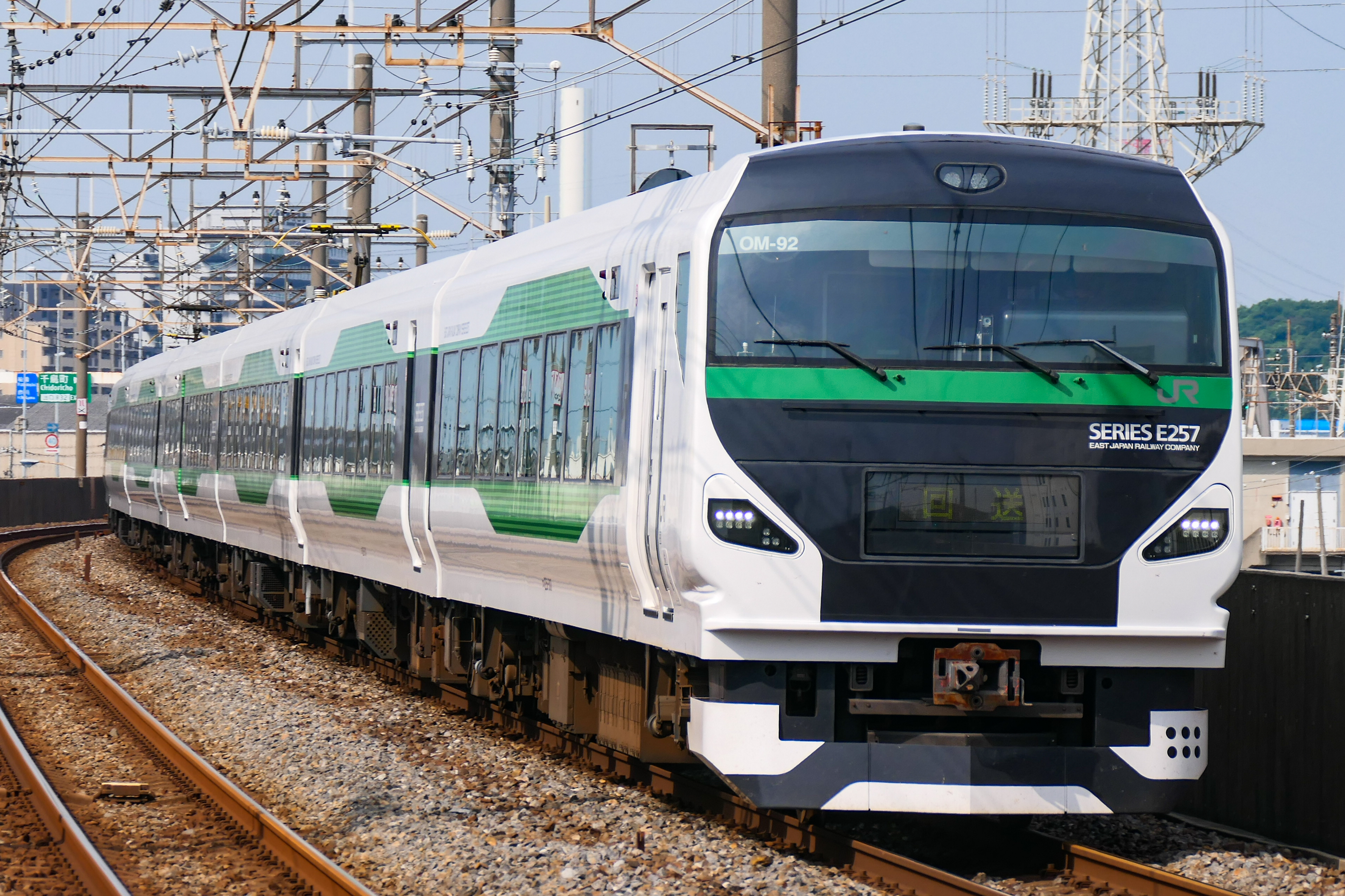
- E257-5000 series set OM-92

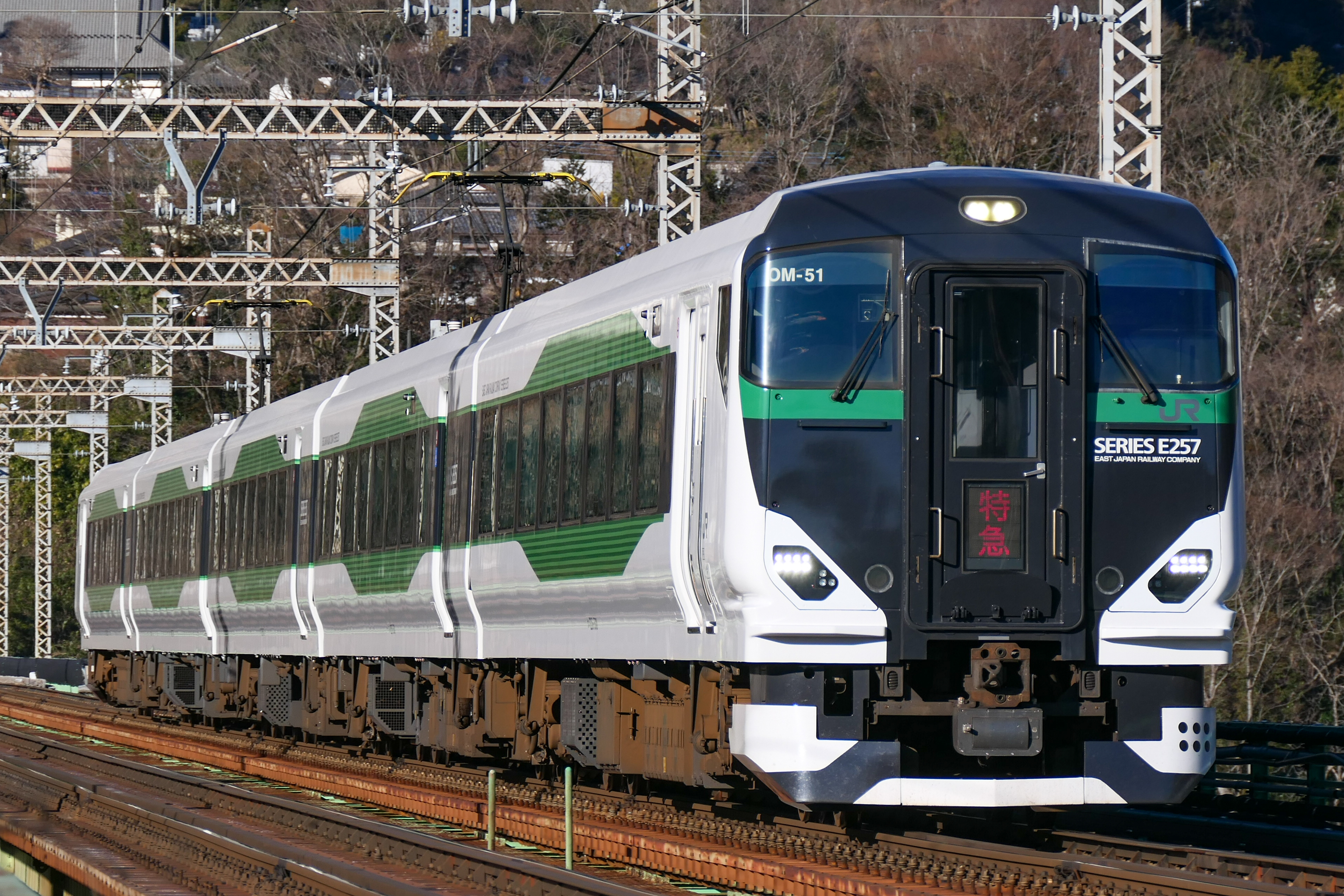
- E257-5500 series set
- In service: 2021–present
- Replaced: 651-1000 series (Akagi, Kusatsu/Shima)
- Number in service: 52 vehicles (3 × 9-car, 5 × 5-car)
- Formation: 9 cars per 5000 subseries set; 5 cars per 5500 subseries set
- Fleet numbers: OM-91 – (5000 subseries)
- Depot: Omiya
- Line served: Takasaki Line

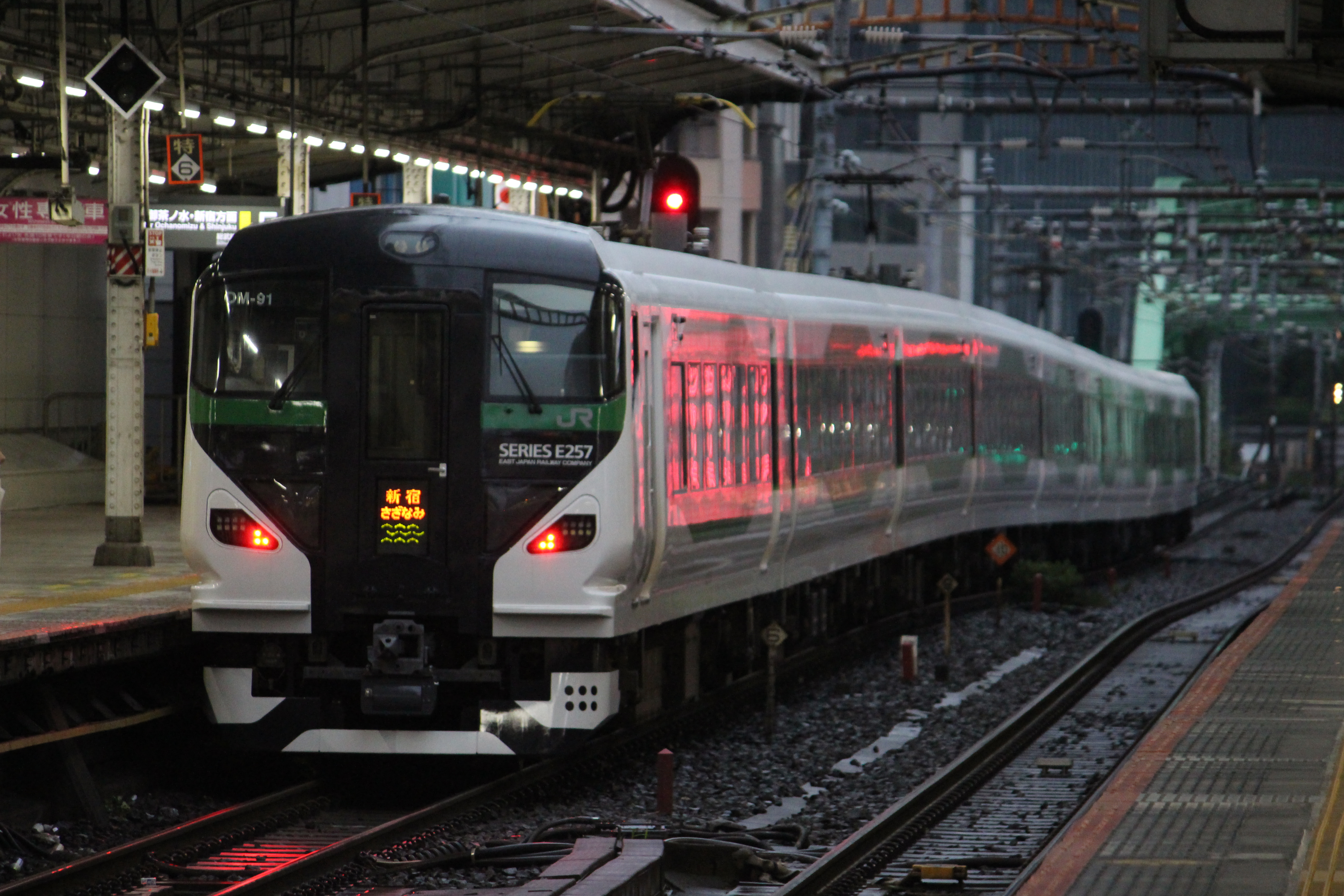
Gangwayed end of an E257-5000 series set

Three E257-0 series sets and five -500 series sets were refurbished and designated as E257-5000 and -5500 series respectively for use on additional and charter services. The refurbishments saw a new front head, which is similar to the -2000/2500 series, and new green-accented livery. Interiors were much retained, with more luggage space and updated curtains. The first E257-5000 set, OM-91 (former M-105), first appeared in May 2021 and entered service on 12 August 2021.

In December 2022, JR East announced that E257-5500 series sets would be used on Kusatsu/Shima and Akagi limited express services on the Takasaki Line. They made their first trips on these services at the start of JR East's 18 March 2023 timetable revision, replacing 651-1000 series 7-car sets.
