= Ayame (train) =

Japanese limited express train service (1975–2015)

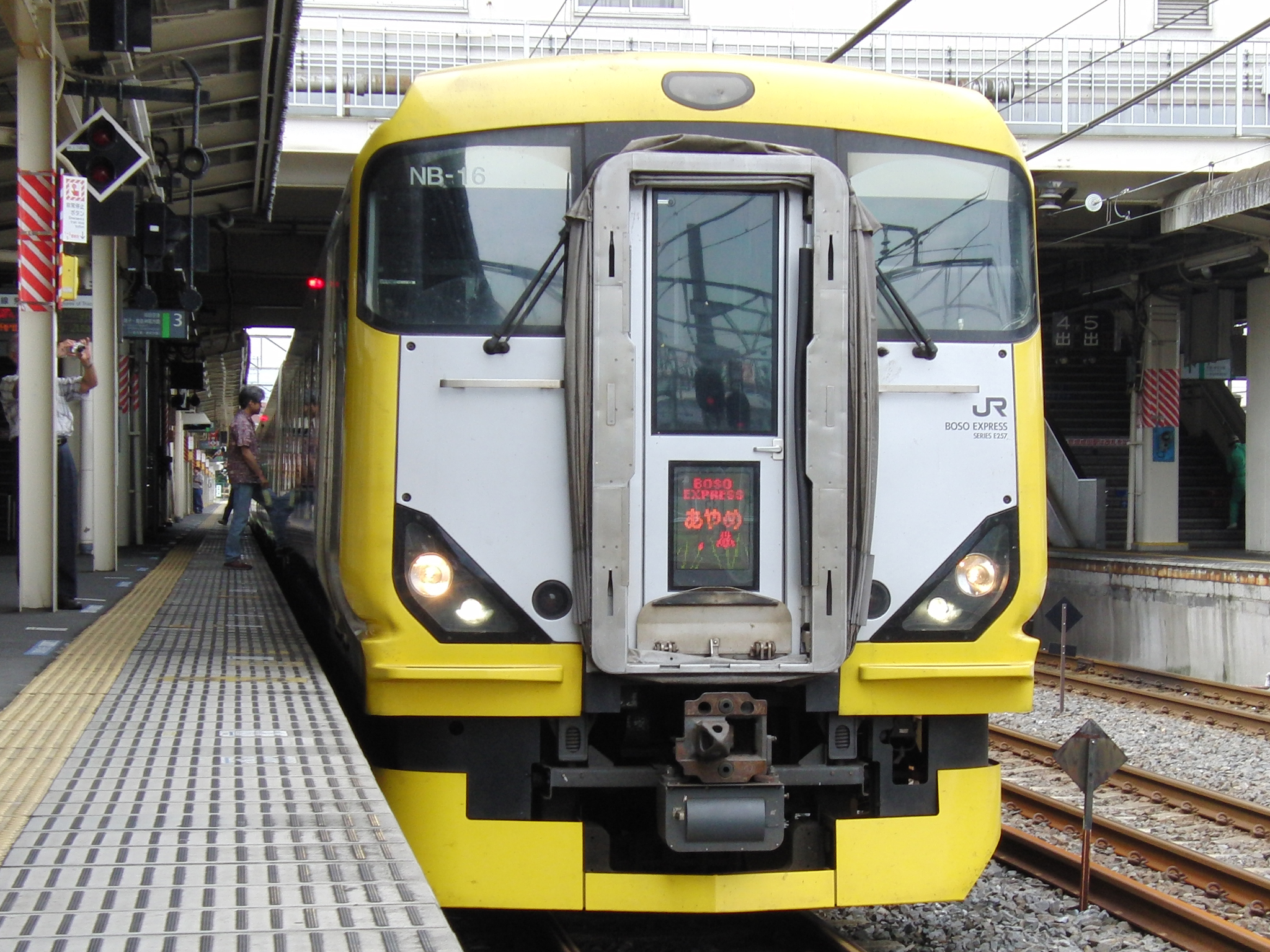
- An E257-500 series on an Ayame service in June 2012

Overview
- Service type: Limited express
- Status: Discontinued
- Locale: Kanto region, Japan
- First service: 10 March 1975
- Last service: 13 March 2015
- Former operator(s): JNR; JR East

Route
- Termini: Tokyo; Kashima-Jingu or Chōshi
- Service frequency: 2 return workings daily
- Line(s) used: Sobu Main Line, Narita Line

On-board services
- Class(es): Ordinary class only
- Seating arrangements: Unidirectional 2+2

Technical
- Rolling stock: E257-500 series EMUs
- Track gauge: 1,067 mm (3 ft 6 in)
- Electrification: 1,500 V DC overhead
- Operating speed: 130 km/h (80 mph)

The Ayame (あやめ; "iris") was a limited express train operated by East Japan Railway Company (JR East) between Tokyo, Kashima-Jingu and Chōshi via Sawara. First introduced in 1975, the last service ran on 13 March 2015.

== History ==
The Ayame service was first introduced on 10 March 1975, initially as four return workings daily between Tokyo and Kashima-Jingu.

The late 1980s saw increased competition from long-distance bus services between Tokyo and Kashima, and from the July 1993 timetable revision, the number of Ayame services was reduced to three return workings daily. In December 1994, services were further cut back, with just one up service in the morning and one down service in the evening. From the October 2004 timetable revision, the complementary Suigō limited express (Shinjuku to Chōshi via Narita Line) and Hometown Narita services were discontinued and the number of Ayame services was correspondingly increased to four up and two down services daily. From the start of the revised timetable on 10 December 2005, Ayame services were made entirely no-smoking.

By March 2014, there were two return Ayame workings daily: one return working between Tokyo and Kashima-Jingu, and one between Tokyo and Chōshi. The services operated as all-stations "Local" services between Sawara and Kashima-Jingu or Chōshi. The down Ayame 3 service from Tokyo to Choshi operated coupled to the weekdays-only Shiosai 17 service (to Narutō) as far as Sakura, where the trains divided.

From the start of the 14 March 2015 timetable revision, the remaining Ayame services were discontinued due to low ridership amid competition by bus services, despite the fact that its scheduled travel time between Tokyo and Kashima-Jingu was only one hour and 43 minutes, about 40 minutes faster than bus schedules.

== Rolling stock ==
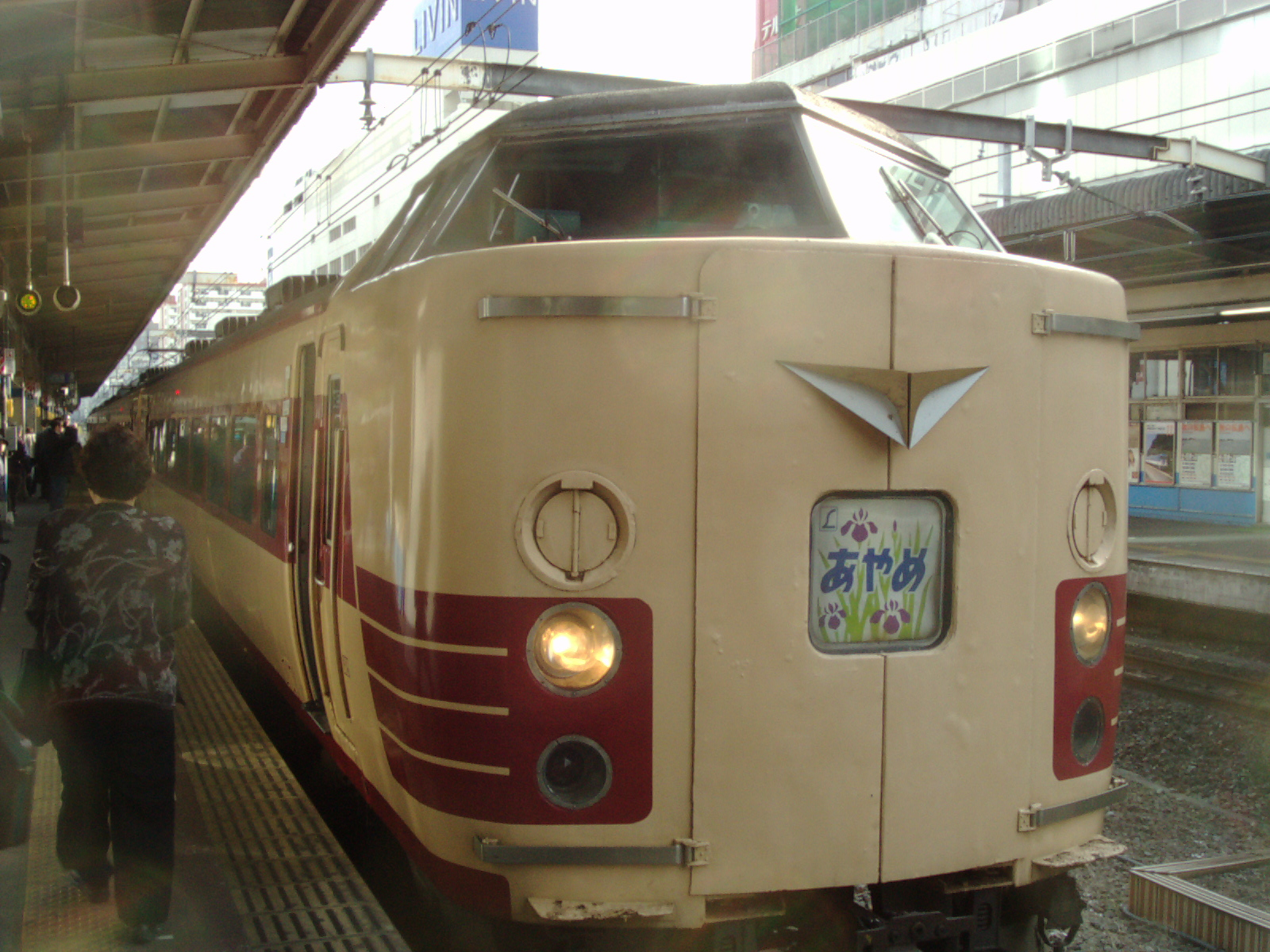
A 183 series EMU on an Ayame service in 2005

- 183 series 6-car EMUs
- E257-500 series 5-car EMUs (December 2005 – March 2015)

== Formations ==
Trains were formed as shown below, with car 1 at the Tokyo end. All cars were ordinary class and non-reserved.

Car No.	1	2	3	4	5
Numbering	KuHa E256-500	MoHa E257-1500	MoHa E256-500	MoHa E257-500	KuHa E257-500
Accommodation	Non-reserved	Non-reserved	Non-reserved	Non-reserved	Non-reserved
Facilities		Toilet	Toilet		Toilet

== See also ==
- List of named passenger trains of Japan
