= Sazanami (train) =

Japanese limited express train service

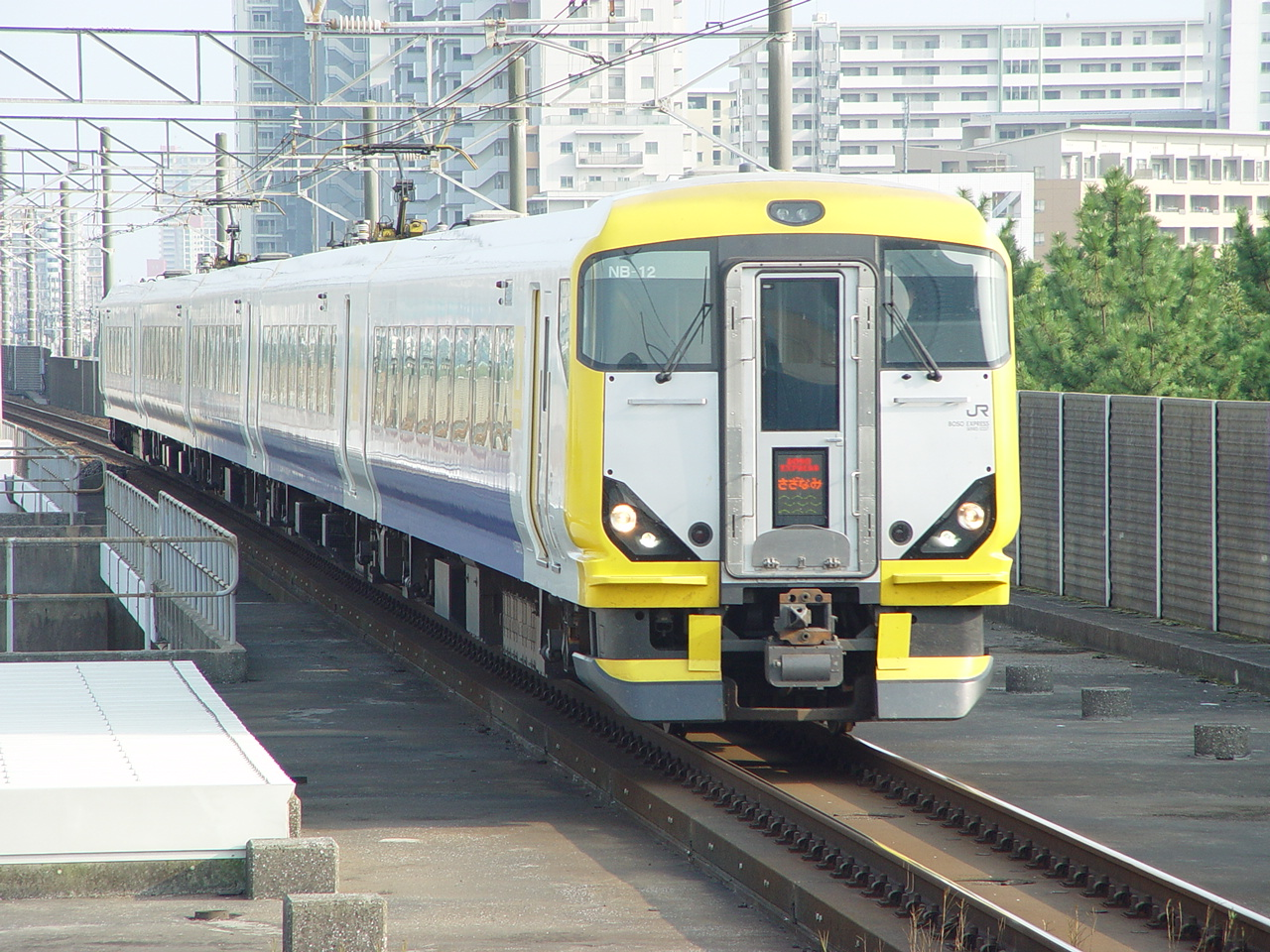
- A E257-500 series EMU on a Sazanami service in October 2006

Overview
- Service type: Limited express
- Status: Operational
- Locale: Chiba Prefecture
- First service: 15 July 1972
- Current operator: JR East
- Former operator: JNR

Route
- Termini: Tokyo; Kimitsu
- Distance travelled: 128.9 km (80.1 mi)
- Lines used: Keiyo Line, Uchibo Line, Chūō Line, Sobu Line

On-board services
- Catering facilities: Trolley service

Technical
- Rolling stock: E257-500 series EMUs
- Track gauge: 1,067 mm (3 ft 6 in)
- Electrification: 1,500 V DC overhead
- Operating speed: 120 km/h (75 mph)

The Sazanami (さざなみ) is a limited express train service in Japan operated by East Japan Railway Company (JR East). It runs between Tokyo and Tateyama via the Keiyo Line and Uchibō Line.

Seasonal Shinjuku Sazanami services operate "mainly on weekends and holidays when service is heavy" between Shinjuku and Tateyama via the Chūō Line and Sōbu Line. As of March 2024, trains no longer stop at Akihabara or Tsudanuma.

As of 12 March 2022, 5 outbound trains and 3 inbound trains are operated each day, except on Saturdays and holidays. These trains stop at the following stations listed below:

Tokyo - Soga - Goi - (Anegasaki) - Kisarazu - Kimitsu

== Rolling stock ==
- E257-500 series 5-car EMUs
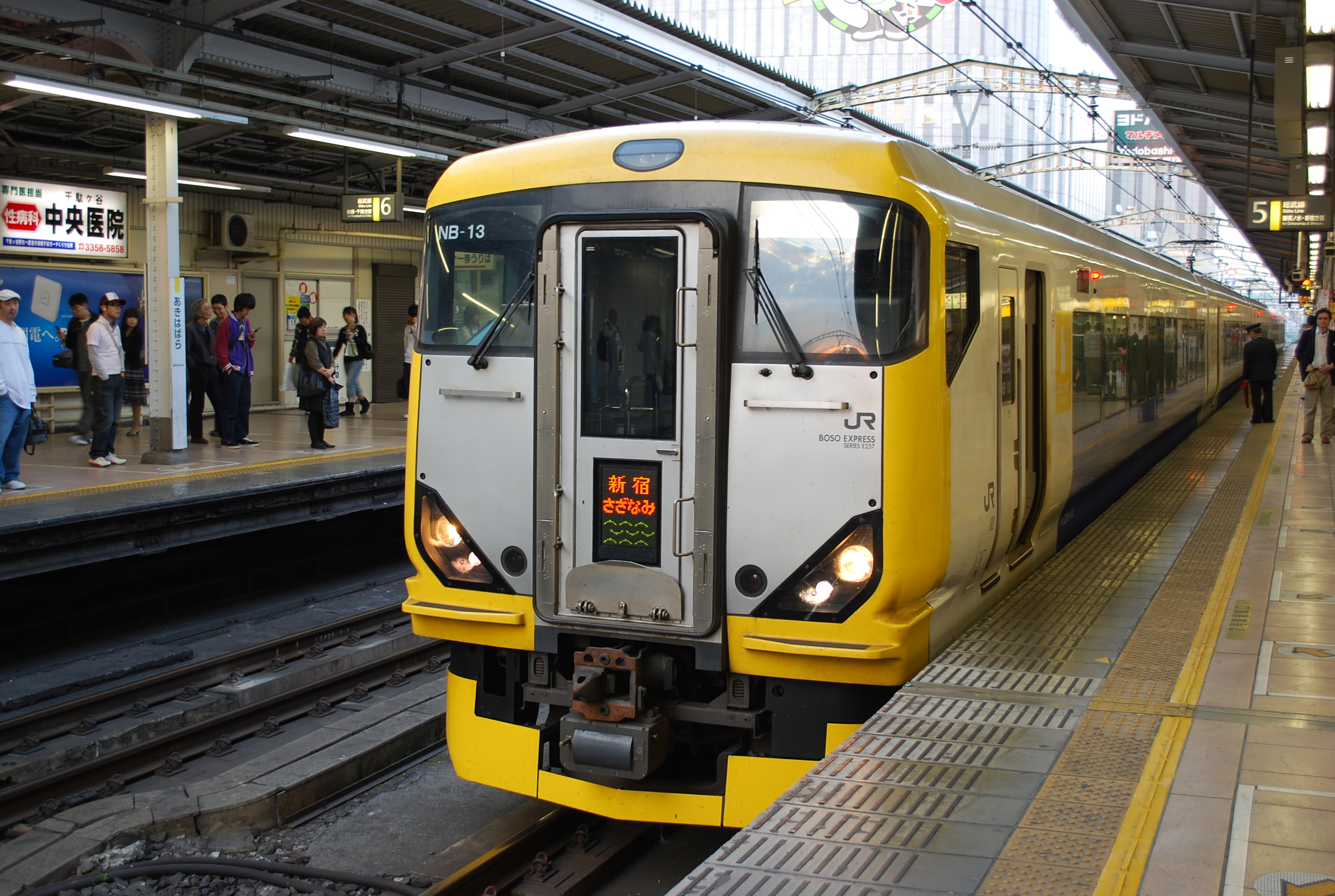
A E257-500 series EMU on a Shinjuku Sazanami service in May 2010 at Akihabara Station

== Former rolling stock ==
- 183/189 series 9-car EMUs
- 255 series 9-car EMUs
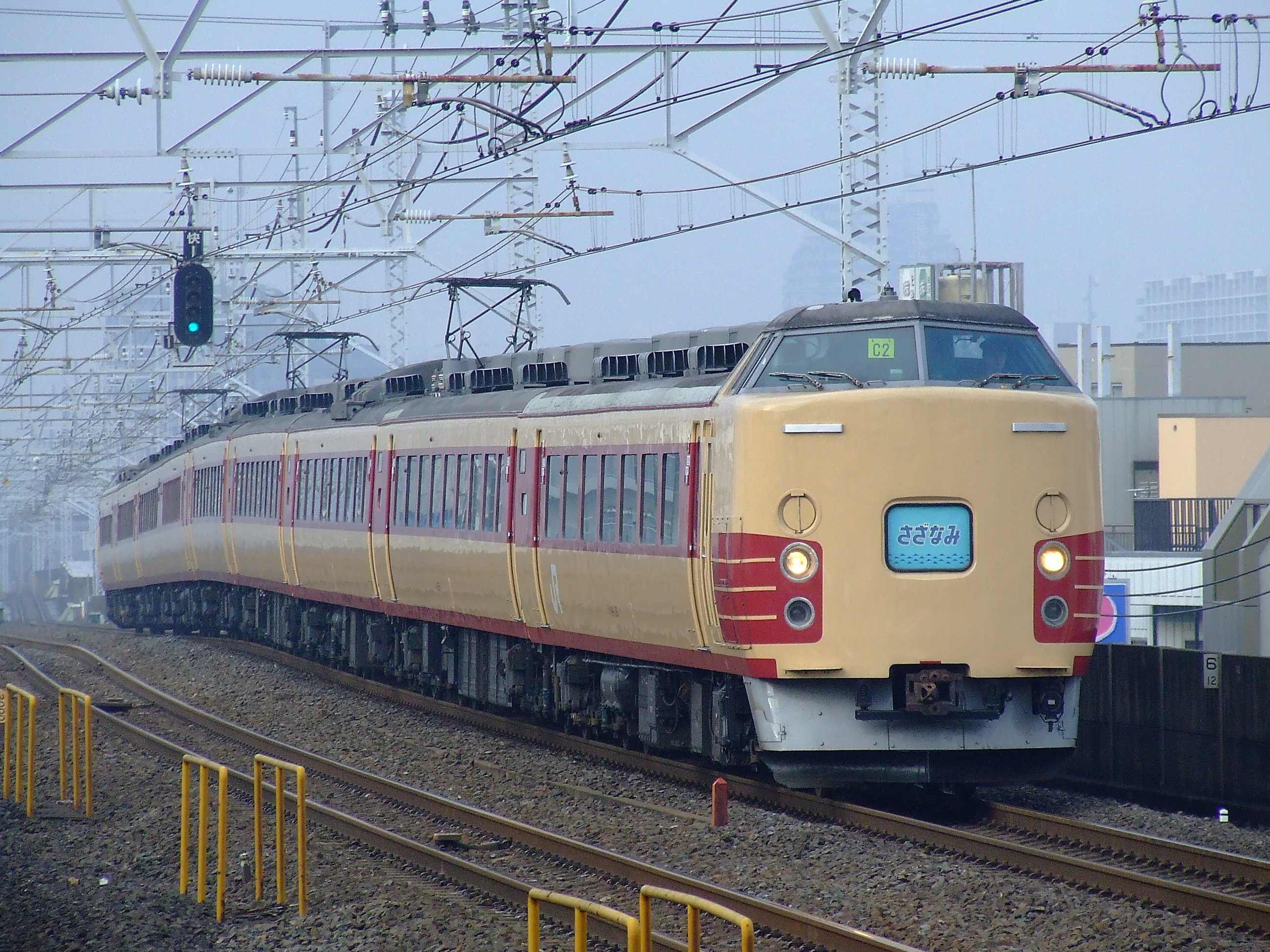
A 189 series EMU on a Shinjuku Sazanami service in February 2007

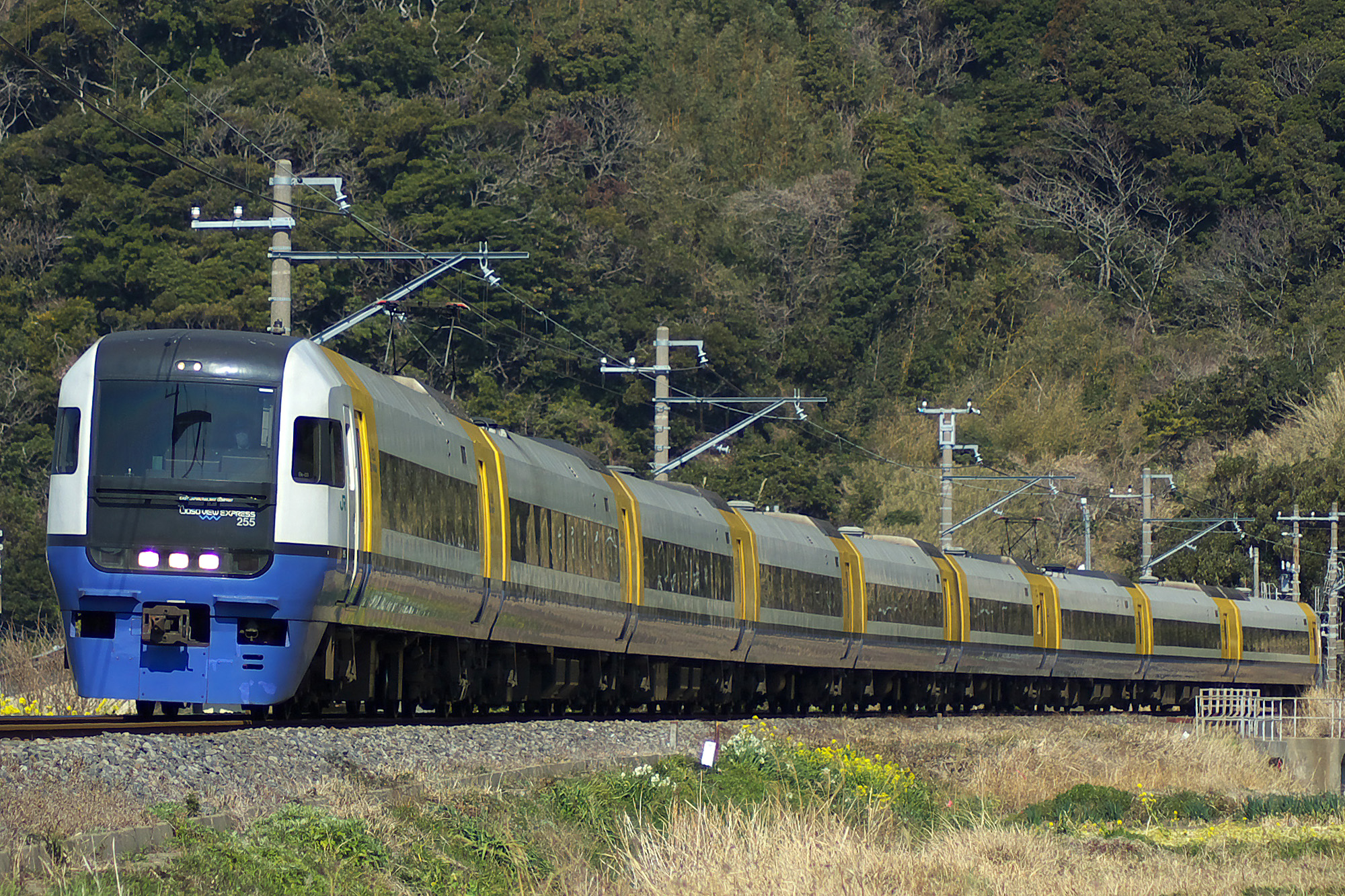
A 255 series EMU on a Sazanami service in March 2008

== Formations ==
Sazanami trains are formed as shown below, with car 1 at the Tokyo end.

=== 5-car E257 series ===
| Car No. | 1 | 2 | 3 | 4 | 5 |
|---|---|---|---|---|---|
| Numbering | KuHa E256-500 | MoHa E257-1500 | MoHa E256-500 | MoHa E257-500 | KuHa E257-500 |
| Accommodation | Reserved | Reserved | Reserved | Non-reserved | Non-reserved |

=== 9-car 255 series (No. 6 only) ===
| Car No. | 1 | 2 | 3 | 4 | 5 | 6 | 7 | 8 | 9 |
|---|---|---|---|---|---|---|---|---|---|
| Numbering | KuHa 254 | MoHa 254 | MoHa 255 | SaRo 255 | SaHa 254 | SaHa 255 | MoHa 254 | MoHa 255 | KuHa 255 |
| Accommodation | Reserved | Reserved | Reserved | Green | Reserved | Non-reserved | Non-reserved | Non-reserved | Non-reserved |

== History ==
- 15 July 1972 - Sazanami service starts coinciding with opening of the underground Sōbu Line platforms at Tokyo Station.
- 16 March 1991 - Sazanami service are rerouted via the Keiyo Line from Tokyo.
- 2 July 1993–255 series EMUs are introduced on View Sazanami services from Tokyo to Chikura.
- 16 October 2004 - E257-500 series EMUs are introduced.
- 10 December 2005 - The View Sazanami name is discontinued, and all services are made entirely no-smoking.

The opening of the Tokyo Bay Aqua-Line road across the Tokyo Bay in 1997 saw increased competition from long-distance bus services offering cheaper fares, resulting in decreasing ridership figures on the Sazanami services. From the start of the 15 March 2014 timetable revision, the number of services was reduced to six return workings daily.

== See also ==
- List of named passenger trains of Japan
