= Ōme (train) =

Japanese limited express train service

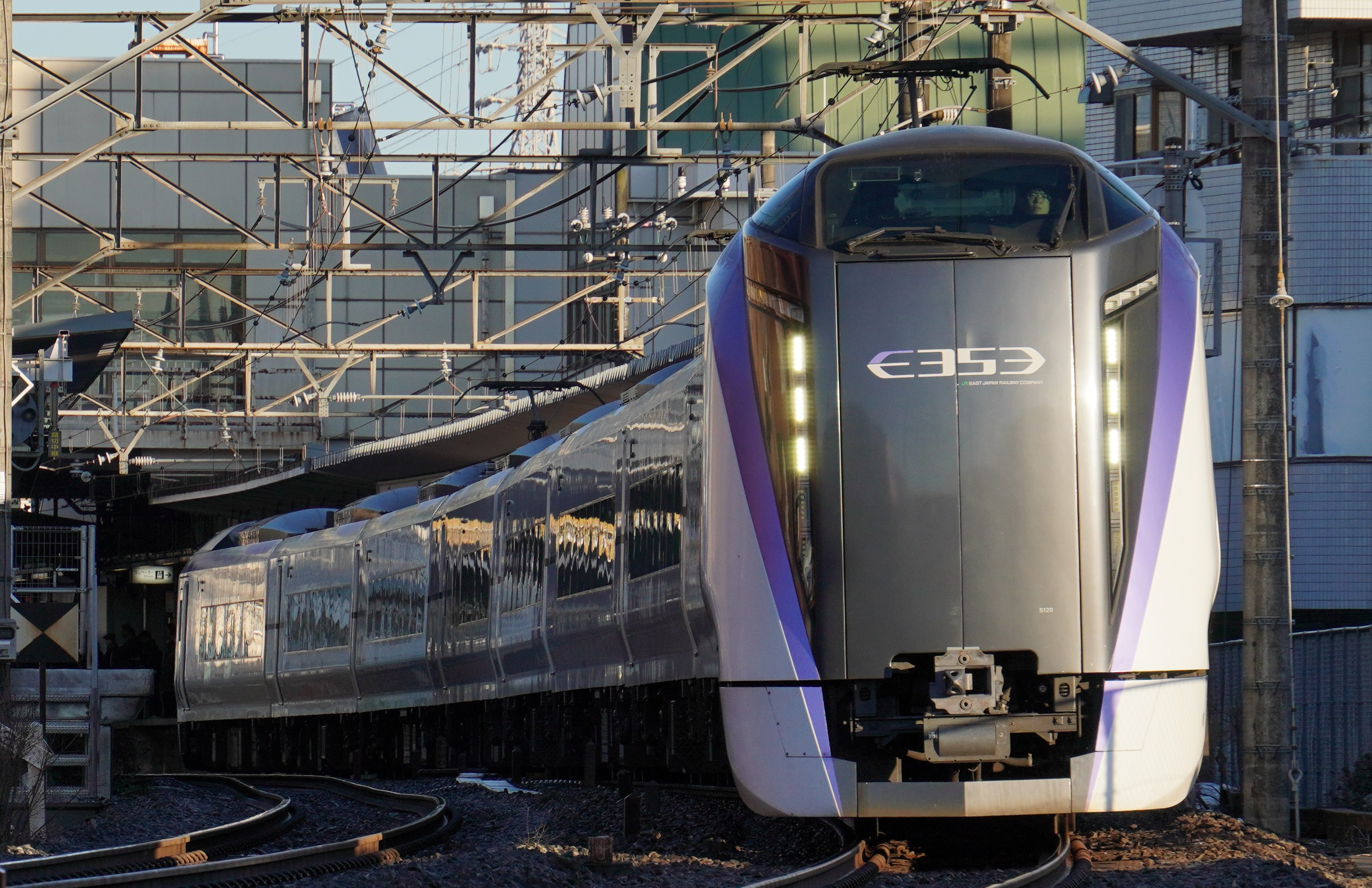
- E353 series EMU on an Ōme service, March 2024

Overview
- Service type: Limited express; Liner (before 16 March 2019)
- Status: Discontinued
- Locale: Tokyo, Japan
- First service: 16 March 1991 (as Ohayō Liner Ōme and Home Liner Ōme); 1 December 2001 (as Ōme Liner); 16 March 2019 (as Ōme)
- Last service: 15 March 2019 (Ōme Liner); 14 March 2025 (Ōme)
- Current operator: JR East

Route
- Termini: Tokyo; Ōme
- Lines used: Chūō Rapid Line, Ōme Line

On-board services
- Class: Green + Standard class

Technical
- Rolling stock: E353 series EMUs
- Track gauge: 1,067 mm (3 ft 6 in)
- Electrification: 1,500 V DC overhead

The Ōme (おうめ) was a limited express train service for commuters on the Chūō Rapid Line and Ōme Line operated by East Japan Railway Company (JR East). The train operated on weekdays only. All seats were reserved on this train.

Prior to 16 March 2019, this train operated as the Ōme Liner (青梅ライナー), which was a limited-stop reserved-seat "Home Liner" service.

== Route ==
Tokyo - Shinjuku - Tachikawa - Haijima - Kabe - Ōme

== Service outline ==
=== As Ōme ===
As per the timetable change of March 14 2020, the Ōme operated as follows:

==== Morning ====
- Ōme Ltd. Express 2: Ōme (06:16) to Tokyo (07:31)

==== Evening ====
- Ōme Ltd. Express 1: Tokyo (18:30) to Ōme (19:49)
- Ōme Ltd. Express 3: Tokyo (22:15) to Ōme (23:24)

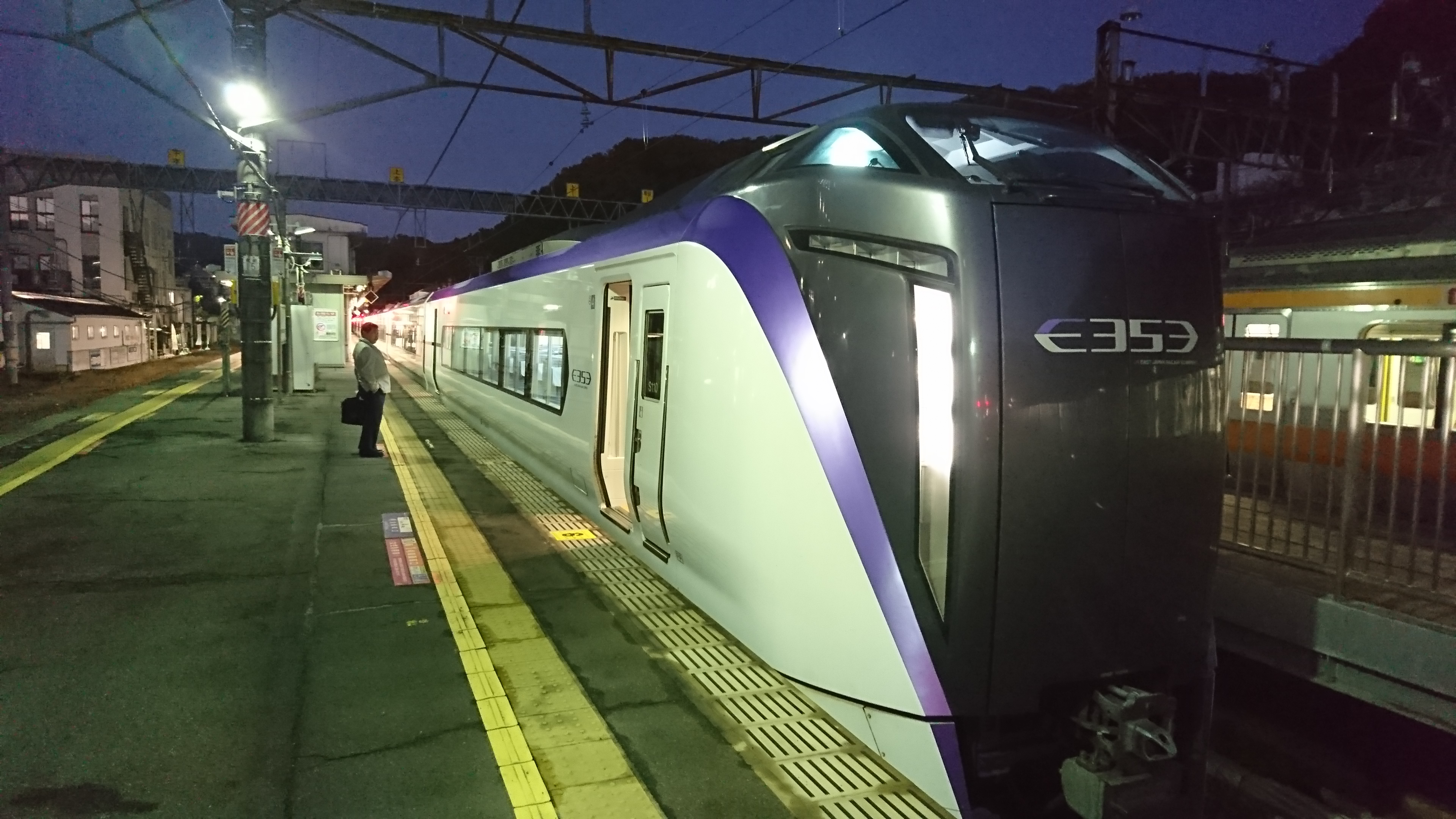
E353 series as the Ōme limited express at Ōme station

=== As Ōme Liner ===
==== Morning ====
- Ōme Liner: Ōme to Tokyo

==== Evening ====
- Ōme Liner 1: Tokyo to Ōme
- Ōme Liner 3: Tokyo to Ōme
- Ōme Liner 5: Tokyo to Ōme

== History ==
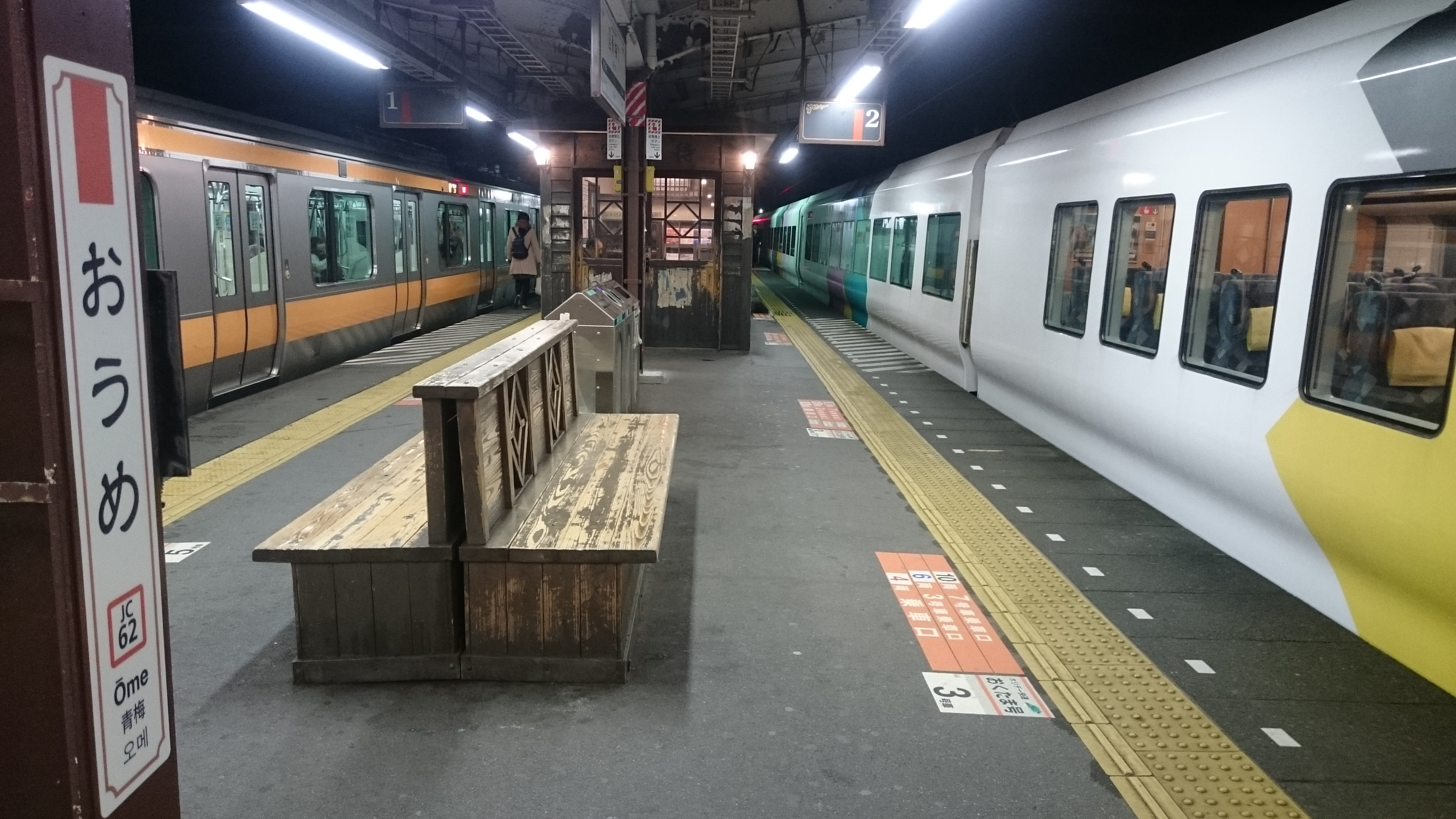
E257 series as the Ōme Liner at Ōme station

JR East announced a new timetable revision which took effect from 16 March 2019 onward. It announced the discontinuation of the Chūō Liner and the Ōme Liner, which was replaced by two new limited express services, the Hachiōji (はちおうじ) and the Ōme (おうめ) respectively. The Ōme operates fewer services than the former Ōme Liner, with one Tokyo-bound train during the morning rush, and two Ōme-bound trains during the evening rush. With this, a new ticketing system is now implemented, in which limited express tickets can be purchased in advance, unlike the Liner tickets which can only be bought on the day of boarding.

However, as the Green Car service will be commenced on the commuter trains of Chūō and Ōme lines, another timetable revision which took effect from 15 March 2025 was announced. In this revision, the Ōme and Hachiōji limited express services were discontinued after six years of operation.

== Rolling stock ==
=== Current rolling stock ===
- E353 series (since March 16, 2019)

=== Past rolling stock ===
- 183 series 9-car EMUs (from March 16, 1991 until June 29, 2002)
- E257 series 9-car EMUs (since July 1, 2002 until March 15, 2019)

== Formation ==
=== Current formation ===
==== Ōme E353 series ====
←Tokyo					Ōme→				
Car No.	4	5	6	7	8	9	10	11	12
Designation	Tc	M-500	M'-500	M2-2000	T	Ts	M	M'	Tc'
Numbering	KuHa E353	MoHa E353-500	MoHa E352-500	MoHa E353-2000	SaHa E353	SaRo E353	MoHa E353	MoHa E352	KuHa E352
Weight	38.9	39.5	38.3	37.7	35.7	33.1	39.1	38.3	36.1
Capacity	48	66	64	66	64	30	64	64	58

=== Past formation ===
==== Ōme Liner E257 series ====
←Tokyo						Ōme→
-	3	4	5	6	7	8		9	10	11
-	Reserved	Reserved	Reserved	Reserved	Reserved	Re	Grn	Reserved	Reserved	Reserved

== See also ==
- Hachiōji (train), formerly Chūō Liner, a similar limited express service
- List of named passenger trains of Japan
