= Hachiōji (train) =

Japanese limited express train service

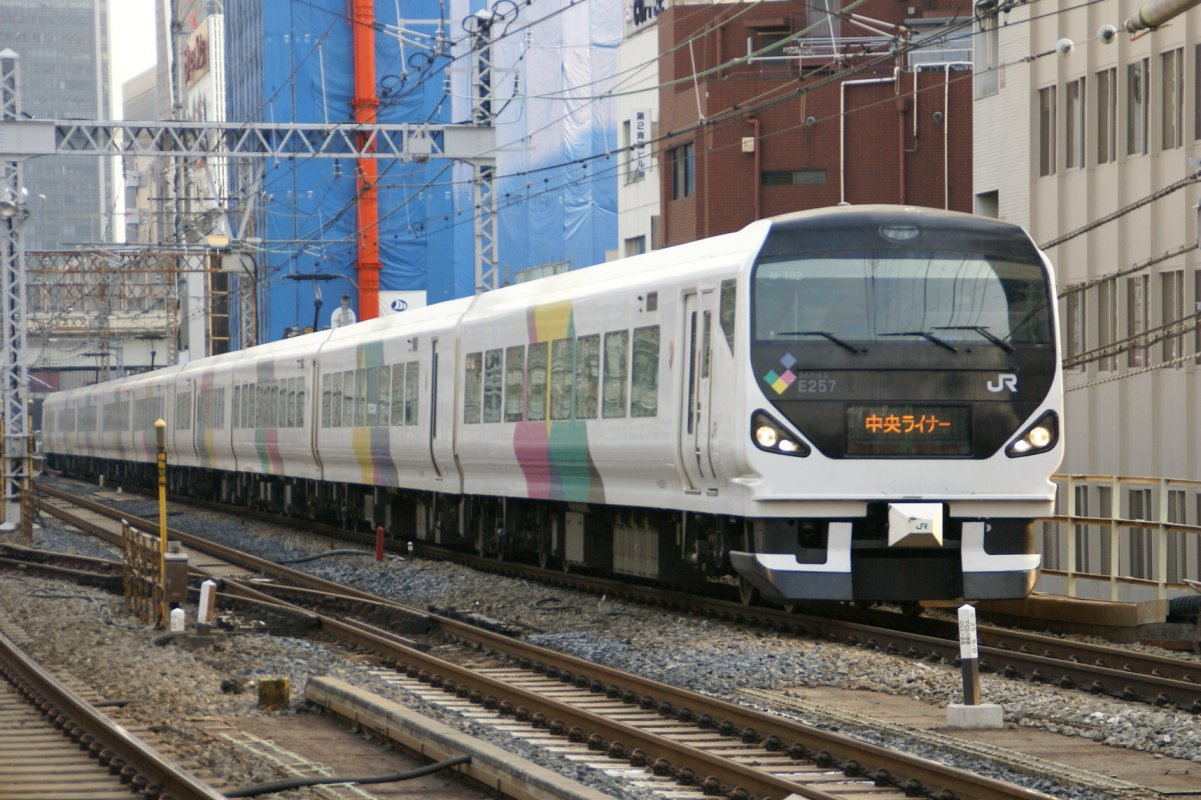
- An E257 series EMU on a down evening Chūō Liner service in April 2008

Overview
- Service type: Limited express; Liner (Before 16 March 2019)
- Status: Discontinued
- Locale: Tokyo, Japan
- First service: 16 March 1991 (as Ohayō Liner Takao and Home Liner Takao); 1 December 2001 (as Chūō Liner); 16 March 2019 (as Hachioji)
- Last service: 15 March 2019 (Chūō Liner); 14 March 2025 (Hachiōji)
- Current operator: JR East

Route
- Termini: Tokyo; Hachiōji
- Stops: Shinjuku, Tachikawa
- Line used: Chūō Rapid Line

On-board services
- Class: Green + Standard class

Technical
- Rolling stock: E353 series EMUs
- Track gauge: 1,067 mm (3 ft 6 in)
- Electrification: 1,500 V DC overhead

The Hachiōji (はちおうじ) was a limited express train service for commuters on the Chūō Rapid Line operated by East Japan Railway Company (JR East). The train operated on weekdays only. All seats were reserved on this train.

Prior to 16 March 2019, this train operated as the Chūō Liner (中央ライナー), which was a limited-stop reserved-seat "Home Liner" service. Since 16 March 2019, the Chūō Liner had been upgraded to limited express status and become known as the Hachiōji.

== Service outline ==
=== As Hachiōji ===
==== Morning ====
- Hachiōji 2: Hachiōji to Tokyo
- Hachiōji 4: Hachiōji to Tokyo

==== Evening ====
- Hachiōji 1: Tokyo to Hachiōji
- Hachiōji 3: Tokyo to Hachiōji
- Hachiōji 5: Tokyo to Hachiōji
- Hachiōji 7: Tokyo to Hachiōji
- Hachiōji 9: Tokyo to Hachiōji
- Hachiōji 11: Tokyo to Hachiōji

=== As Chūō Liner ===
==== Morning ====
- Chūō Liner 2: Hachiōji to Tokyo
- Chūō Liner 4: Takao to Tokyo

==== Evening ====
- Chūō Liner 1: Tokyo to Takao
- Chūō Liner 3: Tokyo to Takao
- Chūō Liner 5: Tokyo to Takao
- Chūō Liner 7: Tokyo to Hachiōji
- Chūō Liner 9: Tokyo to Takao

== History ==
JR East announced a new timetable revision which took effect from March 2019 onwards. It announced the discontinuation of the Chūō Liner and the Ōme Liner, which was replaced by two new limited express services, the Hachiōji (はちおうじ) and the Ōme (おうめ) respectively. The Hachiōji operates in a similar pattern as the former Chūō Liner, with two Tokyo-bound trains during the morning rush, and six Hachiōji-bound trains during the evening rush. With this, a new ticketing system is now implemented, in which limited express tickets can be purchased in advance, unlike the Liner tickets which can only be bought on the day of boarding.

However, as the Green Car service will be commenced on the commuter trains of Chūō and Ōme lines, another timetable revision which took effect from 15 March 2025 was announced. In this revision, the Hachiōji and Ōme limited express services were discontinued after 6 years of operation.

== Rolling stock ==
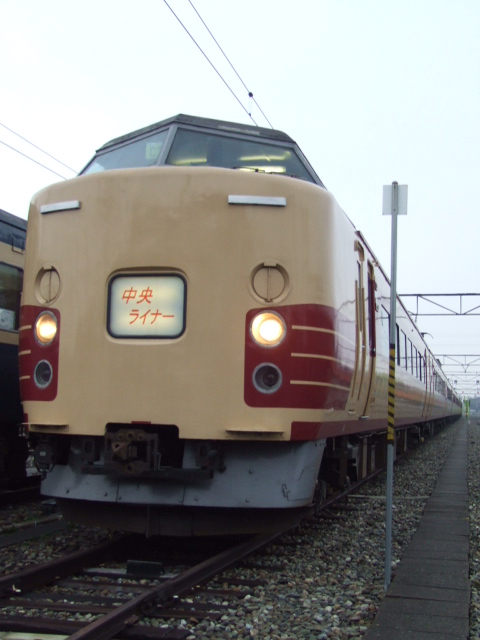
183 series EMU displaying Chūō Liner headboard panel

=== Current rolling stock ===
- E353 series (since 16 March 2019)

=== Past rolling stock ===
- 183 series 9-car EMUs (from 16 March 1991 to 16 March 2008)
- E351 series 12-car EMUs (from 15 March 2008 to 16 March 2018)
- E257 series 9- or 11-car EMUs (from 1 July 2002 to 15 March 2019)

== Formations ==
=== Past formations ===
==== Chūō Liner E257 series ====
←Tokyo/Shinjuku						Hachiōji/Takao→
1	2	-	3	4	5	6	7	8		9	10	11
Reserved	Reserved	-	Reserved	Reserved	Reserved	Reserved	Reserved	Re	Grn	Reserved	Reserved	Reserved

==== Chūō Liner E351 series ====
←Tokyo/Shinjuku							Hachiōji→
1 Reserved	2 Reserved	3 Reserved	4 Reserved	-	5 Reserved	6 Reserved	7 Reserved	8 Reserved	9 Green	10; Reserved	11; Reserved	12; Reserved

== See also ==
- Ōme (train), formerly Ōme Liner, a similar limited express service
- List of named passenger trains of Japan
