= E351 series =

Japanese electric multiple unit train type

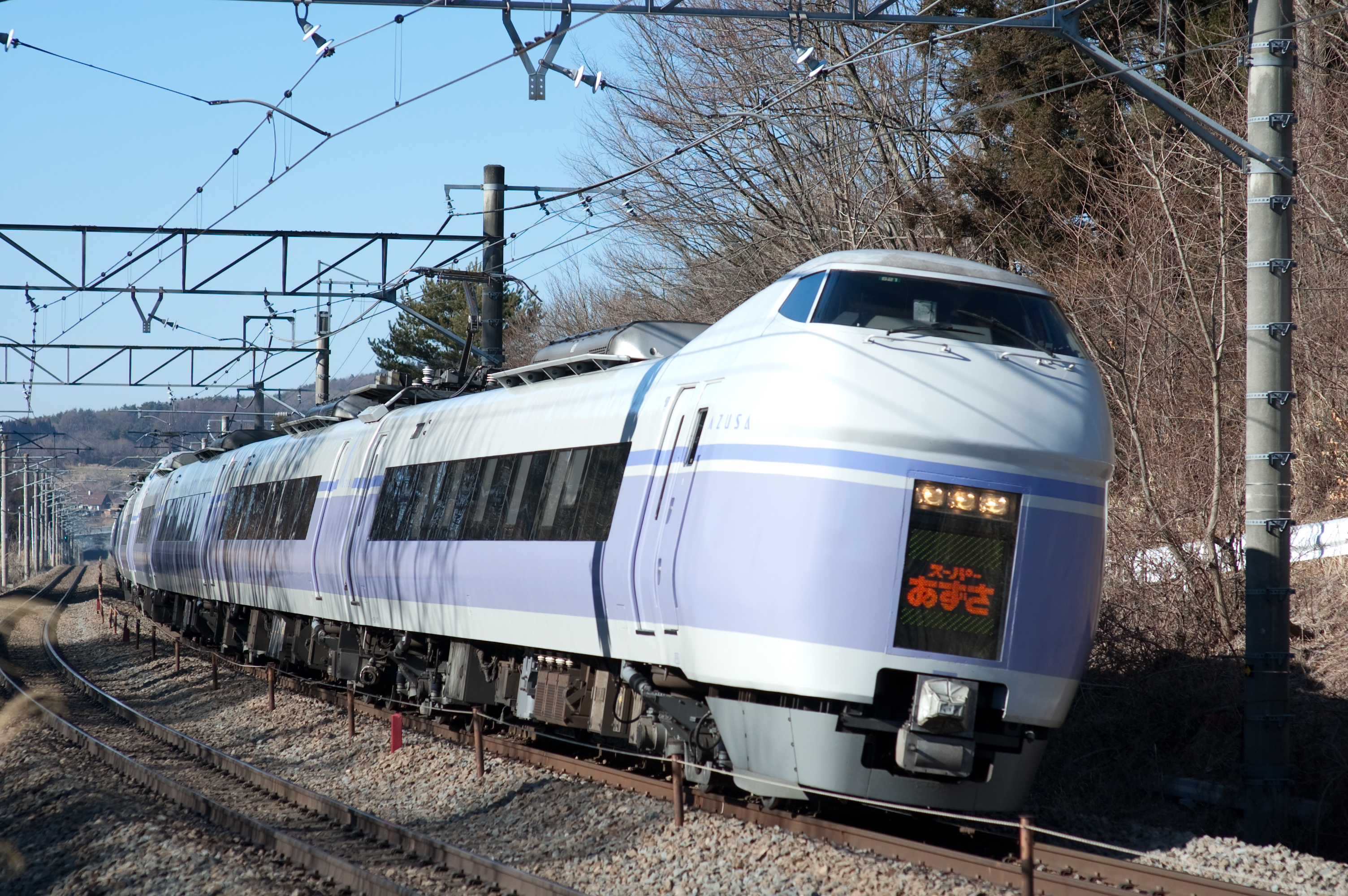
- An E351 series EMU on a Super Azusa service in January 2010
- In service: December 1993 – April 2018
- Manufacturers: Hitachi and Nippon Sharyo
- Replaced: 183 series
- Constructed: 1993-1996
- Entered service: 23 December 1993
- Scrapped: 2017–2018
- Number built: 60 vehicles (10 sets)
- Number in service: None
- Number preserved: None
- Number scrapped: 60 vehicles (10 sets)
- Successor: E353 series
- Formation: 4/8 cars per trainset
- Fleet numbers: S1–S5, S21–S25
- Operator: JR East
- Depot: Matsumoto
- Line served: Chuo Main Line

Specifications
- Car body construction: Steel
- Car length: 20,700–21,680 mm (67 ft 11 in – 71 ft 2 in)
- Width: 2,843 mm (9 ft 3.9 in)
- Height: 3,905 mm (12 ft 9.7 in)
- Doors: 2 per side
- Maximum speed: 130 km/h (81 mph)
- Traction system: Variable frequency (GTO, IGBT)
- Power output: 3,600 kW per 12-car formation
- Electric systems: 1,500 V DC overhead catenary
- Current collection: PS31 single-arm pantograph
- Bogies: DT62A (motored), TR247 (trailer)
- Braking systems: Regenerative brake, electronically controlled pneumatic brakes, snow-resistant brake
- Safety systems: ATS-P, ATS-Ps
- Track gauge: 1,067 mm (3 ft 6 in)

The E351 series (E351系) was a tilting electric multiple unit (EMU) train type operated by East Japan Railway Company (JR East) on Chuo Main Line Super Azusa limited express services in Japan from 1993 to 2018. First introduced in December 1993 (initially on Azusa services), a total of 60 vehicles were built, formed as five eight-car main sets (numbers S1 to S5) and five four-car supplementary (numbers S21 to S25) sets.

== Concept ==
Built jointly by Hitachi and Nippon Sharyo, the tilting E351 series trains were intended to replace the aging 183 series EMUs used on Azusa Limited express services operating between Shinjuku in Tokyo and Matsumoto, and to increase speeds on the highly curved Chūō Main Line.

== Operations ==
At the time of withdrawal in 2018, the E351 series trains were used on the following services:

- Super Azusa limited express services (3 December 1994 – 16 March 2018) – through service to the Oito Line withdrawn 12 March 2010
- Chūō Liner rapid services (15 March 2008 – 16 March 2018) – Commuter services on the Chuo Main Line

Other services previously operated by the series include:

- Azusa limited express services (23 December 1993 – 2 December 1994)
- Ohayo Liner Shinjuku / Home Liner Odawara rapid services (16 March 1996 – 14 March 2008) – Commuter services on the Tokaido Main Line

== Formations ==
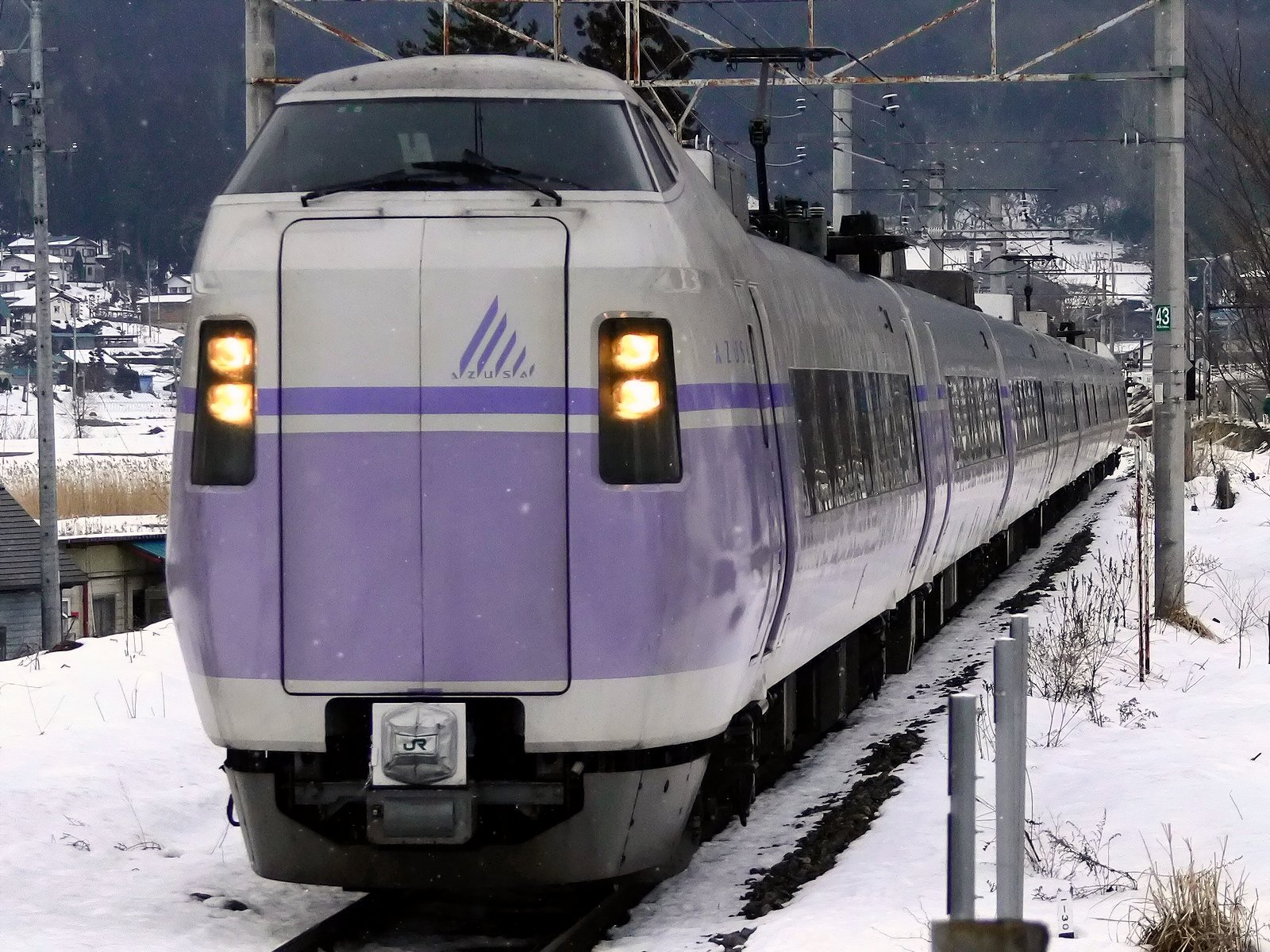
An eight-car set with gangwayed cab car leading in January 2007

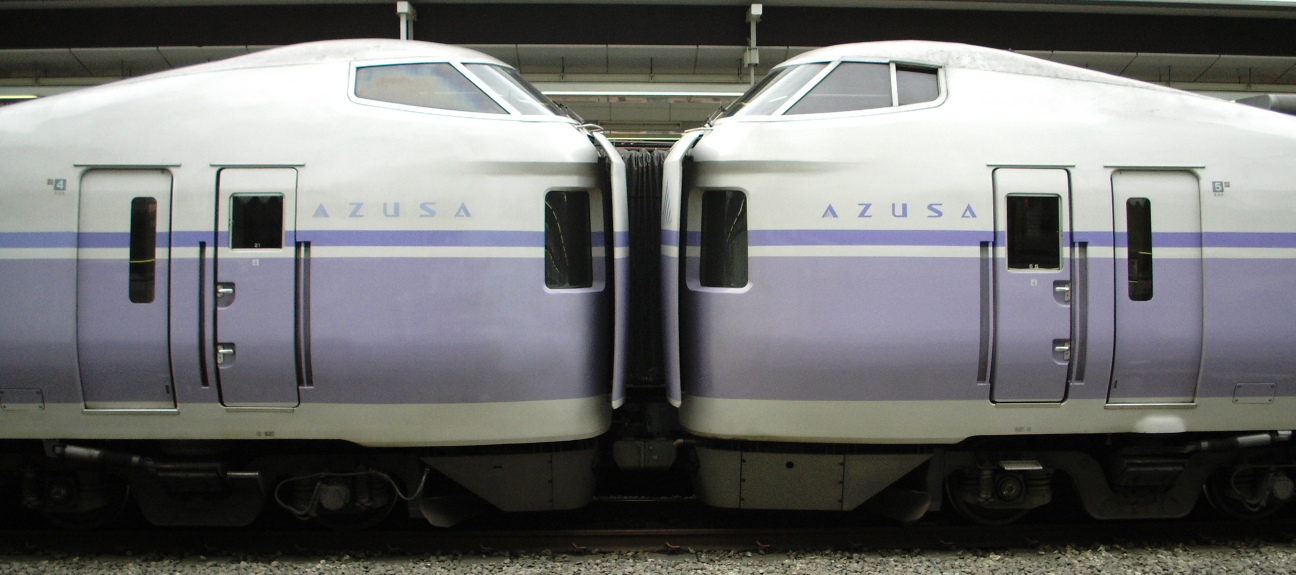
Coupled gangwayed ends at Shinjuku Station in March 2007

The fleet consisted of five four-car sets (S21–S25) and five eight-car sets (S1–S5), formed as shown below, with car 1 (car 5) at the Shinjuku or Tokyo end.

=== 4-car sets S21–S22 ===
Car No.	1	2	3	4
Designation	Tc'	M1	M2	Tc'
Numbering	KuHa E351-1100	MoHa E351-1000	MoHa E350-1000	KuHa E351-1200
Seating capacity	60	52	68	52
Weight (t)	36.9	39.7	39.8	38.2

- Car 4 had a retracting gangway.
- Car 2 was fitted with a PS31 single-arm pantograph.
- Cars 2 and 4 were fitted with toilets.

=== 4-car sets S23–S25 ===
Car No.	1	2	3	4
Designation	Tc	M1	M2	Tc'
Numbering	KuHa E351-0	MoHa E351-0	MoHa E350-0	KuHa E350-100
Seating capacity	60	52	68	52
Weight (t)	38.3	38.3	37.9	36.3

- Car 4 had a retracting gangway.
- Car 2 was fitted with a PS31 single-arm pantograph.
- Cars 2 and 4 were fitted with toilets.

=== 8-car sets S1–S2 ===
Car No.	5	6	7	8	9	10	11	12
Designation	Tc	M1	M2	T	Ts	M1	M2	Tc
Numbering	KuHa E351-1300	MoHa E351-1000	MoHa E350-1100	SaHa E351-1000	SaRo E351-1000	MoHa E351-1100	MoHa E350-1000	KuHa E351-1000
Seating capacity	60	60	64	64	50	55	68	52
Weight (t)	37.2	39.7	40.5	33.9	32.7	39.9	39.8	37.6

- Car 5 had a retracting gangway.
- Cars 6 and 10 were each fitted with a PS31 single-arm pantograph.
- Cars 6, 8, 10, and 12 were fitted with toilets.

=== 8-car sets S3–S5 ===
Car No.	5	6	7	8	9	10	11	12
Designation	Tc	M1	M2	T	Ts	M1	M2	Tc'
Numbering	KuHa E351-100	MoHa E351-0	MoHa E350-100	SaHa E351-0	SaRo E351-0	MoHa E351-100	MoHa E350-0	KuHa E350-0
Seating capacity	60	60	64	64	50	55	68	52
Weight (t)	38.9	38.3	38.4	32.0	32.0	38.9	37.9	35.2

- Car 5 had a retracting gangway.
- Cars 6 and 10 were each fitted with a PS31 single-arm pantograph.
- Cars 6, 8, 10, and 12 were fitted with toilets.

=== Original set formations ===
When first delivered, the two pairs of sets were numbered and formed as shown below, with car 1 at the Shinjuku end.

Car No.	1	2	3	4	5	6	7	8	9	10	11	12
Numbering	KuHa E351-100	MoHa E351	MoHa E350	SaHa E351	SaRo E351	MoHa E351-100	MoHa E351	KuHa E351-200	KuHa E351-300	MoHa E351	MoHa E350	KuHa E351

== Interior ==
Both standard class and Green (first) class seating were arranged 2+2 abreast.

E351 series trains were made entirely no-smoking on 18 March 2007.

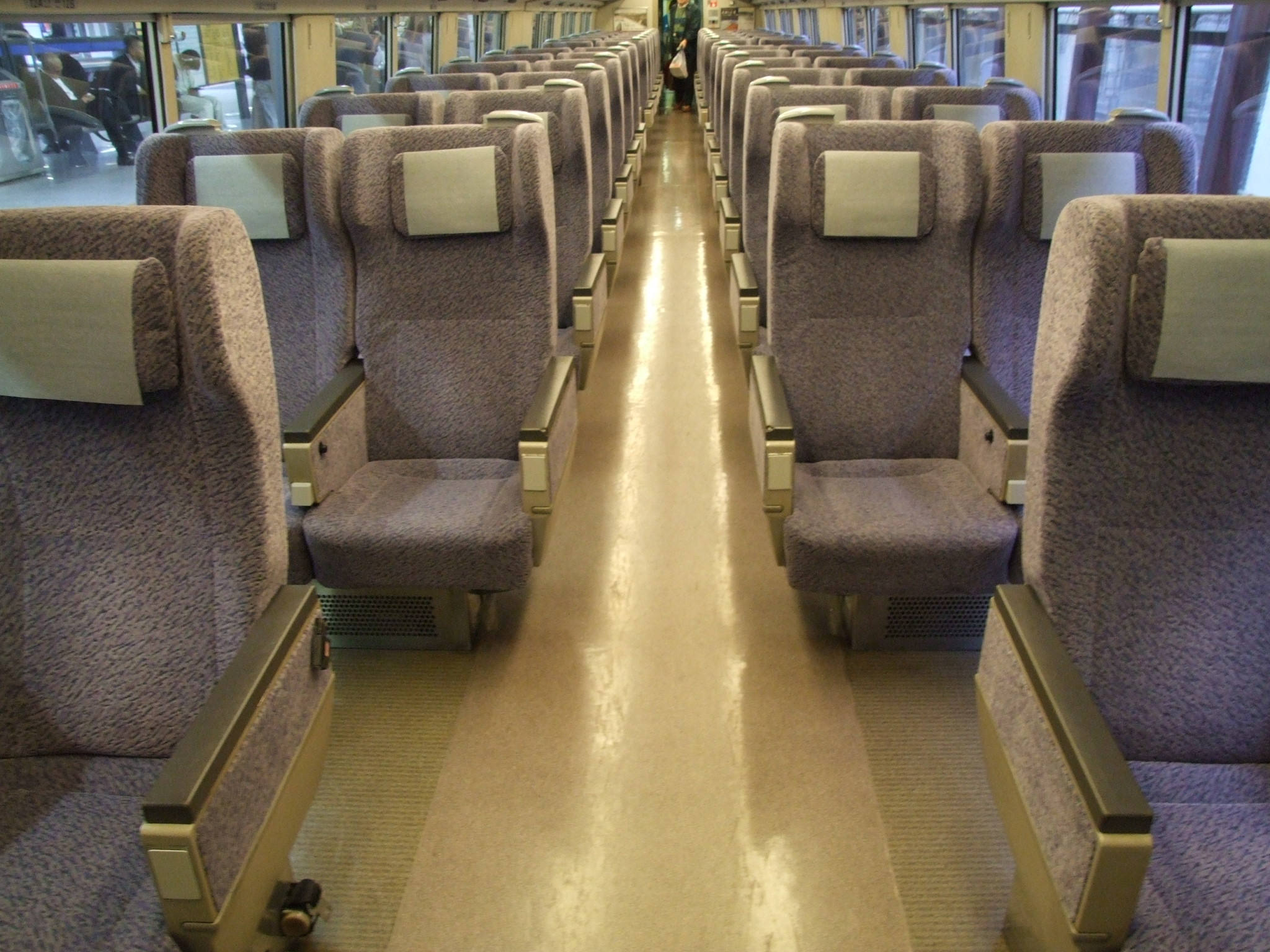
Green car interior

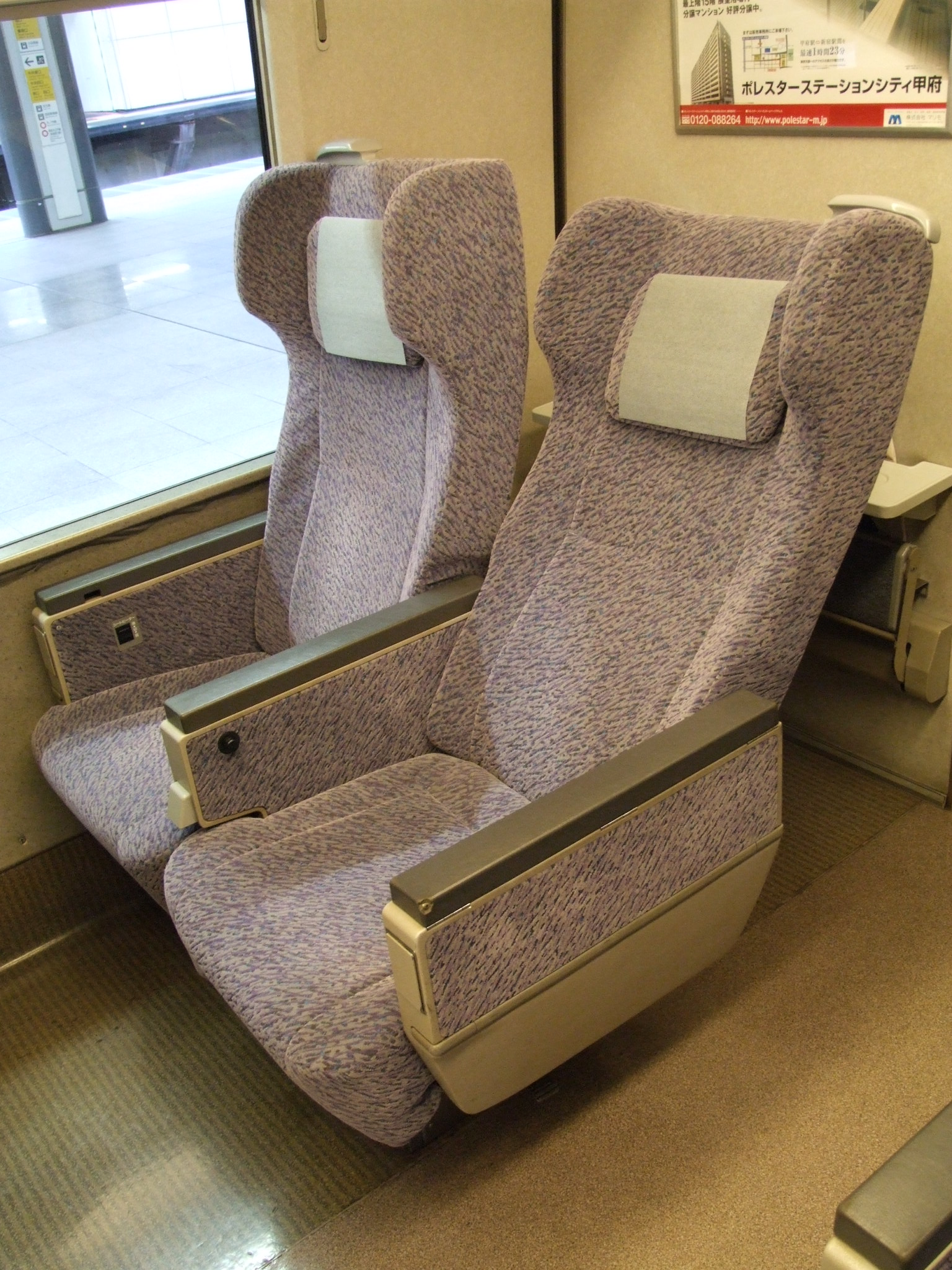
Green car seating

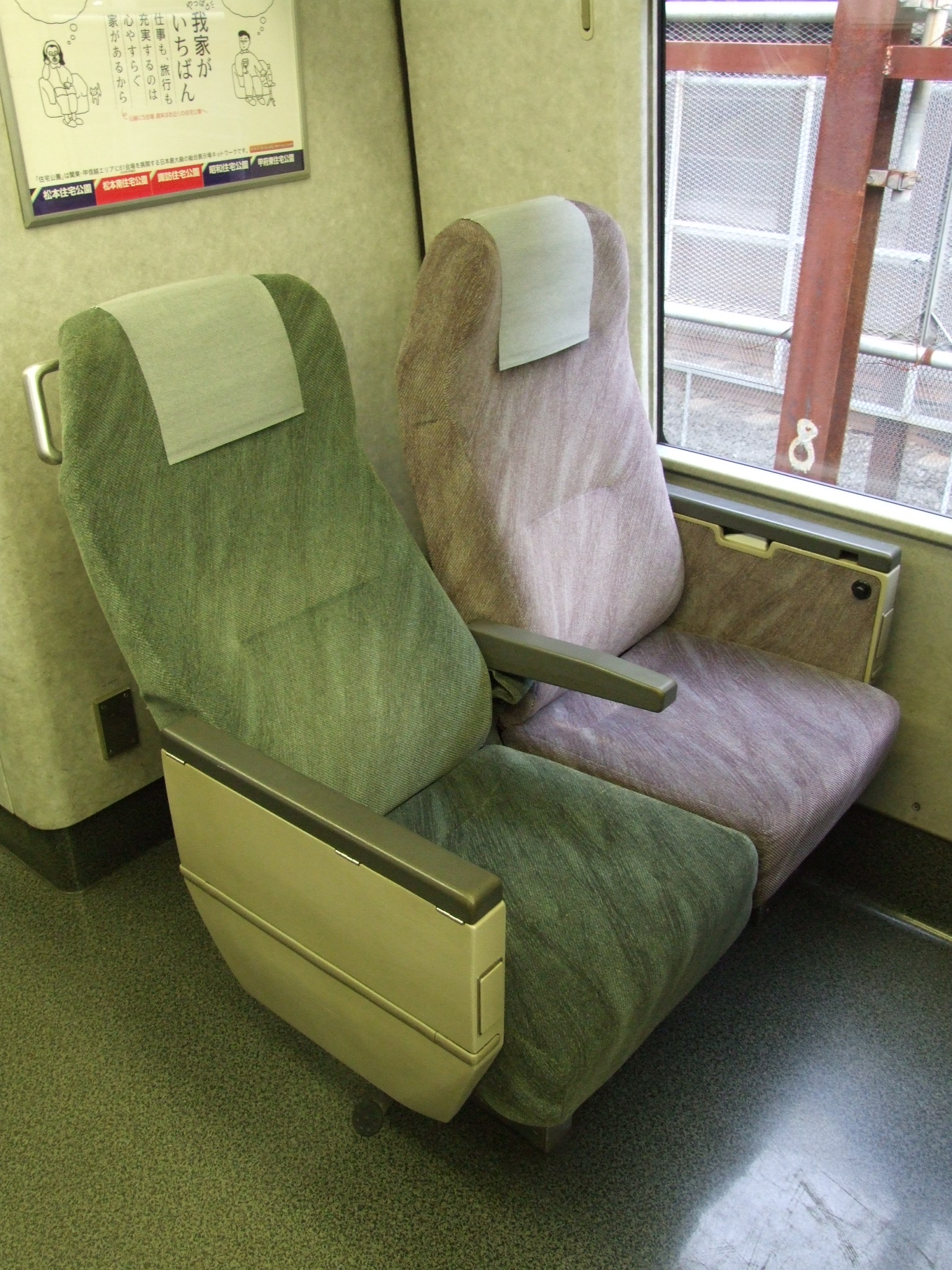
Standard-class seating

== History ==
=== Introduction ===
Two pairs of first-batch sets (S1+S21 and S2+S22) were delivered in 1993, and were introduced on Azusa services from 23 December 1993.

=== Super Azusa introduction ===
From the start of the revised timetable on 3 December 1994, four return Azusa workings were upgraded and rebranded as Super Azusa, operating between Shinjuku and Matsumoto or Minami-Otari using E351 series equipment.

=== 2nd batch ===
Three pairs of second-batch sets were delivered in 1995, and the first two pairs of sets (S1+S21 and S2+S22) were modified to bring them up to production specifications at JR East's Nagano Workshop and Nippon Sharyo, respectively, in March 1996. Modifications included replacing the original PS26C lozenge-type pantographs with PS31 single-arm pantographs, and renumbering the cars in the -1000 series. From the start of the revised timetable on 16 March 1996, the number of Super Azusa services using E351 series equipment was increased from four return trips daily to eight return trips.

=== 1997 Ōtsuki Station collision ===
On 12 October 1997, the down Super Azusa 13 service from Shinjuku to Matsumoto (formed of sets S3+S23) was involved in a collision with a 201 series local train that had overrun a red signal while passing through Ōtsuki Station. Several cars were derailed and one car overturned. Five cars of set S3 were ultimately cut up on site, and replacement car bodies ordered from Hitachi. The rebuilt vehicles retained their original running numbers.

=== Withdrawal ===
The replacement of the E351 series trains by new E353 series EMUs began on 23 December 2017, with the entire fleet phased out from regular passenger services on 16 March 2018.

A special final run service was held on 7 April 2018 to commemorate the E351 series sets' retirement, after which the sets were officially withdrawn.

After their withdrawal, the trains were transferred to Nagano General Rolling Stock Center for scrapping. No E351 series cars have been preserved.

== Build details ==
The individual build details for the fleet are as shown below.

Batch	Set No.	Manufacturer	Date delivered	Date withdrawn
1st	S1	Hitachi	16 September 1993	4 April 2018
1st	S2	Nippon Sharyo	30 September 1993	24 December 2017
2nd	S3	Hitachi	19 December 1995	8 April 2018
2nd	S4	Hitachi	9 January 1996	8 April 2018
2nd	S5	Nippon Sharyo	16 January 1996	24 December 2017
1st	S21	Hitachi	16 September 1993	4 April 2018
1st	S22	Nippon Sharyo	16 October 1993	24 December 2017
2nd	S23	Nippon Sharyo	19 December 1995	8 April 2018
2nd	S24	Hitachi	9 January 1996	8 April 2018
2nd	S25	Nippon Sharyo	16 January 1996	24 December 2017
