= E353 series =

Japanese electric multiple unit train type

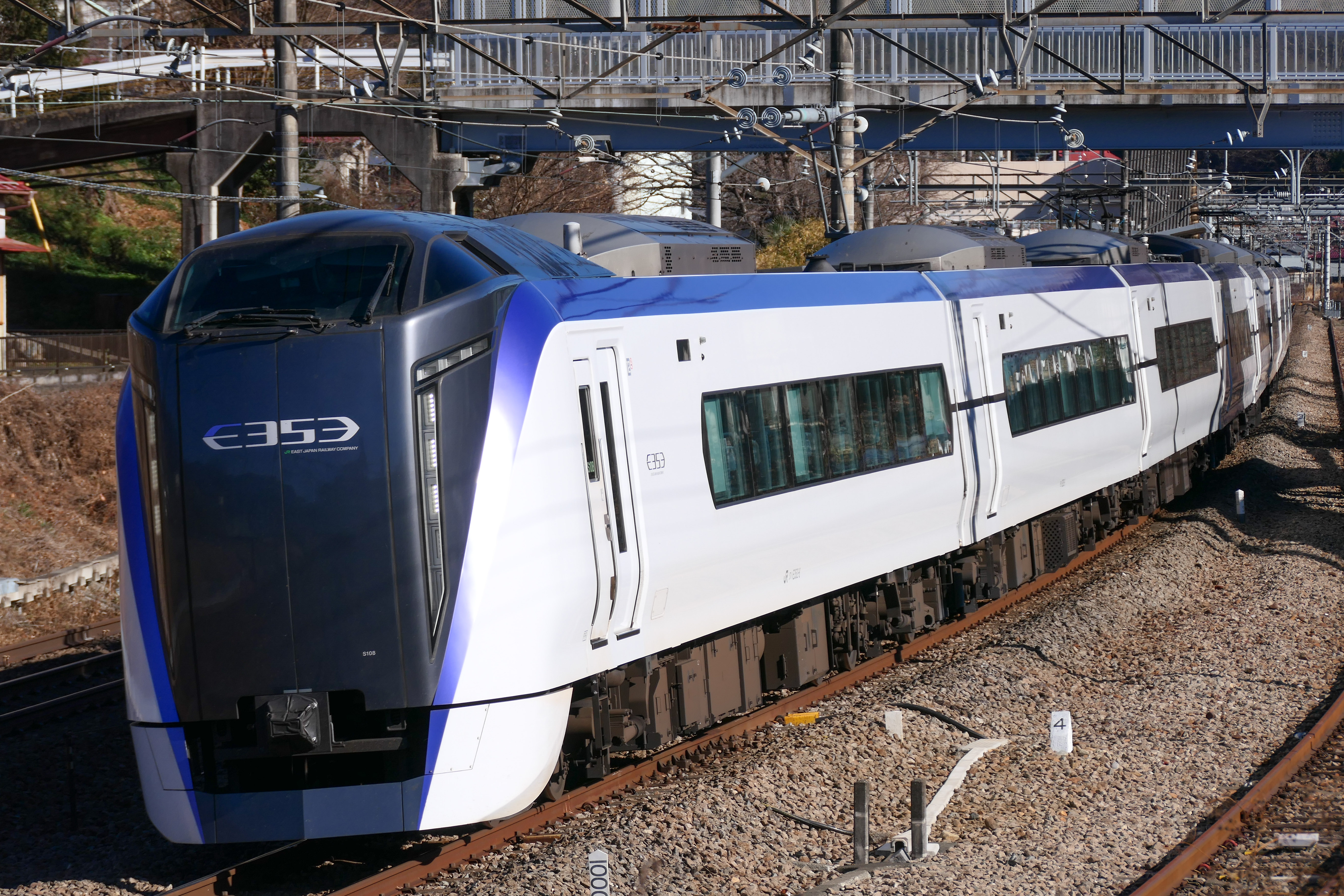
- E353 series on an Azusa service in December 2020
- Stock type: Electric Multiple Unit
- In service: 2017–present
- Manufacturer: J-TREC
- Built at: Kanazawa-ku, Yokohama
- Replaced: E351 series (fully), E257 series (Azusa / Kaiji services only)
- Constructed: 2015–2019
- Entered service: 23 December 2017
- Number built: 213 vehicles; 31 sets (total)
- Number in service: 20 9-car sets, 11 3-car sets
- Formation: 3 or 9 cars per trainset
- Fleet numbers: S101–S120 (9-car sets), S201–S211 (3-car sets)
- Capacity: 686 (656 standard + 30 Green)
- Operator: JR East
- Depot: Matsumoto
- Lines served: Chūō Main Line; Shinonoi Line; Ōito Line; Fujikyuko Line

Specifications
- Car body construction: Aluminium alloy
- Car length: 20,000 mm (65 ft 7 in) (intermediate cars); 21,000 mm (68 ft 11 in) (end cars)
- Width: 2,920 mm (9 ft 7 in)
- Height: 3,540 mm (11 ft 7 in)
- Floor height: 1,130 mm (3 ft 8 in)
- Doors: 1 per side
- Maximum speed: 130 km/h (81 mph)
- Traction system: Mitsubishi Electric SC108 or SC109 IGBT–VVVF
- Traction motors: 8 or 20 × MT75B 140 kW (188 hp) 3-phase AC induction motor
- Power output: 1.12 MW (1,502 hp) (3-car set); 2.8 MW (3,755 hp) (9-car set)
- Acceleration: 0.56 m/s^{2} (1.3 mph/s)
- Deceleration: 1.4 m/s^{2} (3.1 mph/s)
- Electric systems: 1,500 V DC (overhead catenary)
- Current collection: PS39 single-arm pantograph
- UIC classification: 2′2′+Bo′Bo′+Bo′Bo′+Bo′Bo′+2′2′+2′2′+Bo′Bo′+Bo′Bo′+2′2′ (9-car sets); 2′Bo′+Bo′Bo′+Bo′2′ (3-car sets)
- Bogies: DT81, DT82 (motored), TR265 (trailer)
- Safety systems: ATS-P, ATS-PS
- Track gauge: 1,067 mm (3 ft 6 in)

The E353 series (E353系) is a DC tilting electric multiple unit (EMU) train operated by the East Japan Railway Company (JR East) in Japan on limited express services on the Chūō Main Line since December 2017.

A pre-series train, consisting of one nine-car set (set S101) and one three-car set (set S201), was delivered in July 2015 for performance testing. These trains replaced the older E351 series EMUs used on Super Azusa (now Azusa) limited express services on the Chūō Main Line between Shinjuku in Tokyo and Matsumoto in Nagano Prefecture. Originally intended to enter revenue service in spring 2016, the first trains entered service on 23 December 2017.

== Design ==
The exterior styling was overseen by the industrial design firm Ken Okuyama Design. Like the E351 series trains they replaced, the new E353 series trains incorporate tilting technology to allow faster speeds around curves. The trains use a pneumatic tilt system (instead of the pendulum system used in the older trains) and an active suspension to reduce tilt times and help reduce motion sickness in passengers.

The train features a database of curves along the line, allowing the train to begin tilting before reaching the curve. The pre-series train also had dampers installed between the cars to reduce vibrations, but this feature was discontinued on the subsequent production trainsets. Maximum operating speed is 130 km/h (81 mph). To reduce any step up from station platforms, the train floor height is 1,130 mm (3 ft 8.49 in), 10 mm (0.39 in) lower than on E259 series and E657 series trains.

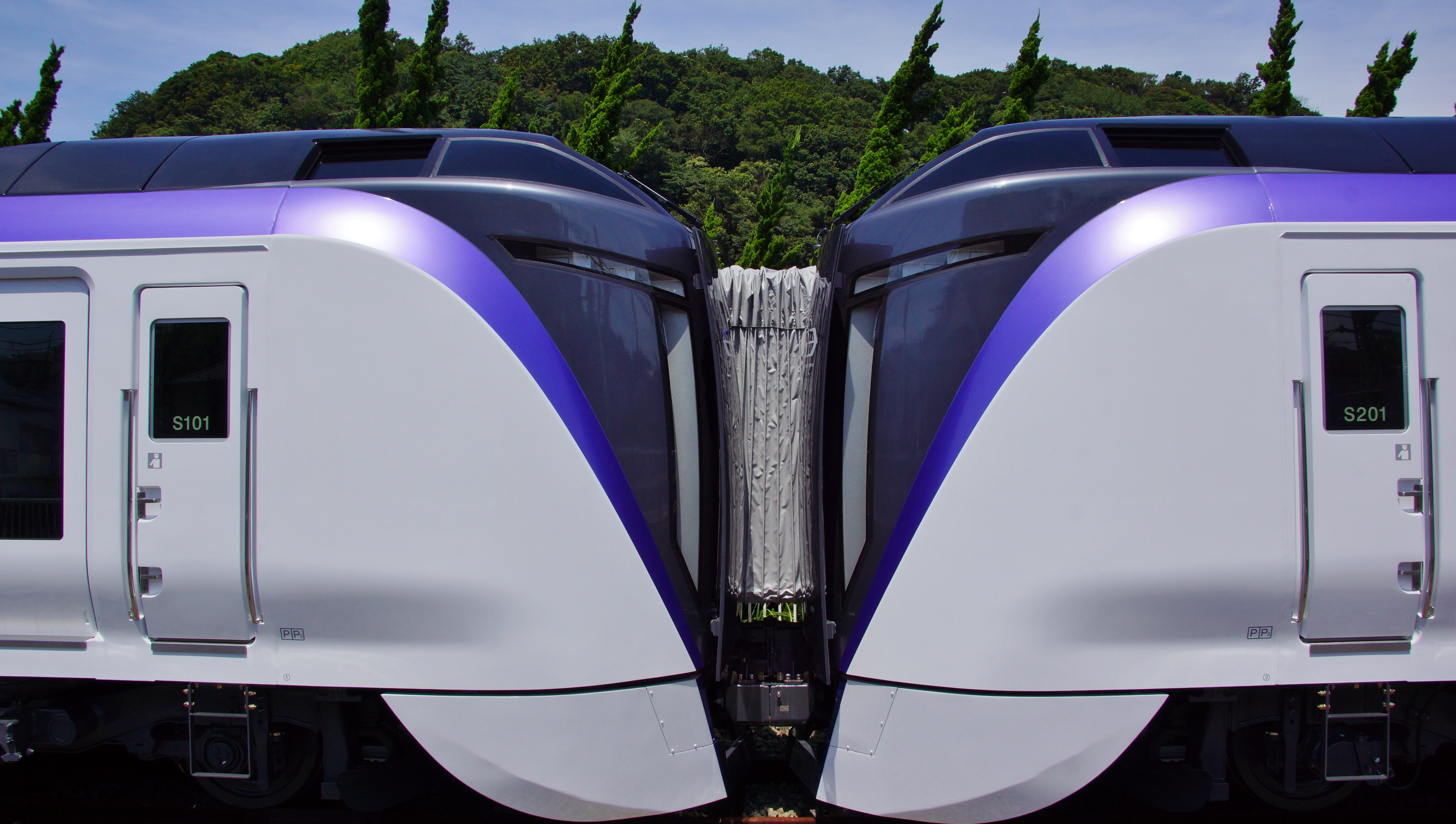
Closeup of the gangway connection between sets S101 (left) and S201 (right) in July 2015

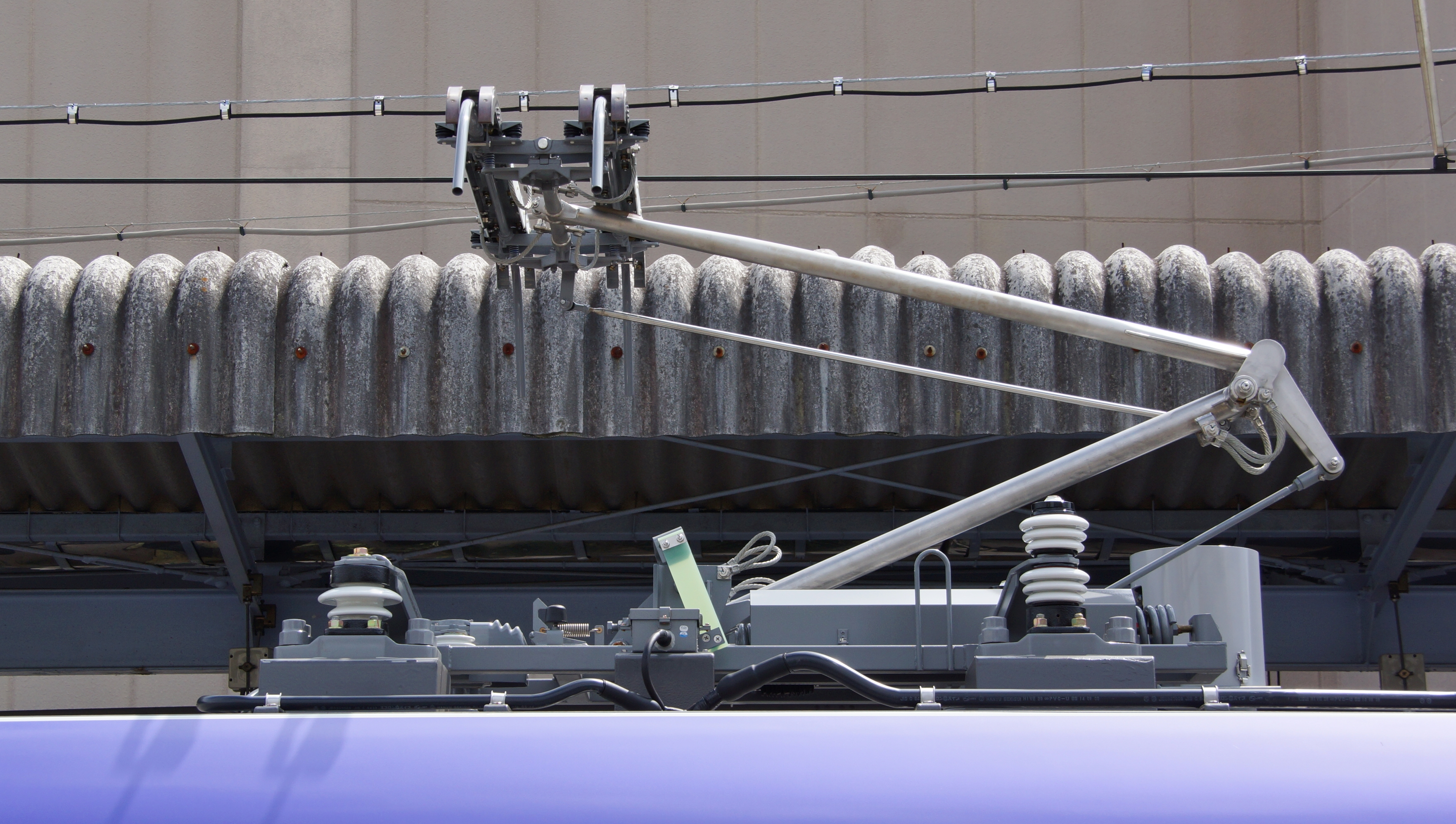
The PS39 single-arm pantograph on MoHa E353-1 (car 10) in July 2015

=== Bogies ===
The trains use bolsterless bogies developed from those used on earlier E259 series and E657 series trains. Motored bogies with capability for retrofitting anti-oscillation equipment (rear bogies on car 1 and 3) are designated DT81, motored bogies equipped anti-roll devices (cars 2, 5, 7, and 10) are designated DT82, and motor bogies not equipped with either (cars 6 and 11) are designated DT81A. Non-powered (trailer) bogies are designated TR265, and are equipped with a parking brake and capability for retrofitting anti-oscillation equipment, but those not equipped with a parking brake (rear bogies on cars 4 and 14, and both bogies on car 9) are designated TR265A, and those on car 8, which not equipped with either are designated TR265B.

== Formations ==
Trains consist of a nine-car main set (with five cars motored), numbered S101 onward, and a three-car add-on set, numbered S201 onward, with car 1 at the southern (Shinjuku) end as follows.

Car No.	1	2	3	4	5	6	7	8	9	10	11	12
Designation	Mc	M1-1000	Mc'	Tc	M-500	M'-500	M2-2000	T	Ts	M	M'	Tc'
Numbering	KuMoHa E353	MoHa E353-1000	KuMoHa E352	KuHa E353	MoHa E353-500	MoHa E352-500	MoHa E353-2000	SaHa E353	SaRo E353	MoHa E353	MoHa E352	KuHa E352
Weight	38.8	40.3	39.9	38.9	39.5	38.3	37.7	35.7	33.1	39.1	38.3	36.1
Capacity	46 (Note: 48 on pre-series set)	46	58 (Note: 60 on pre-series set)	48	66 (Note: 68 on pre-series set)	64	66	64	30	64 (Note: 66 on pre-series set)	64	58

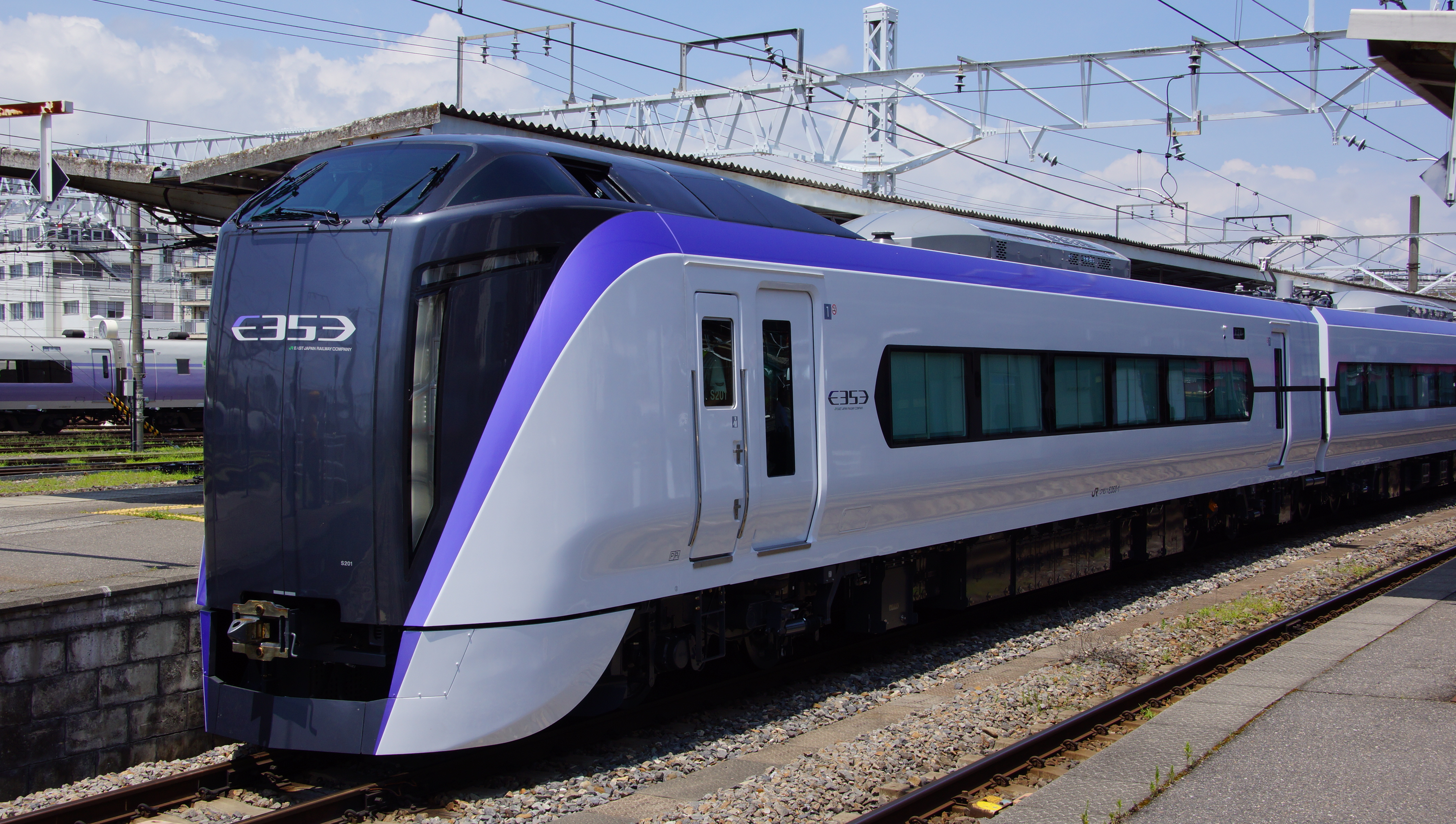
KuMoHa E353-1 (car 1)

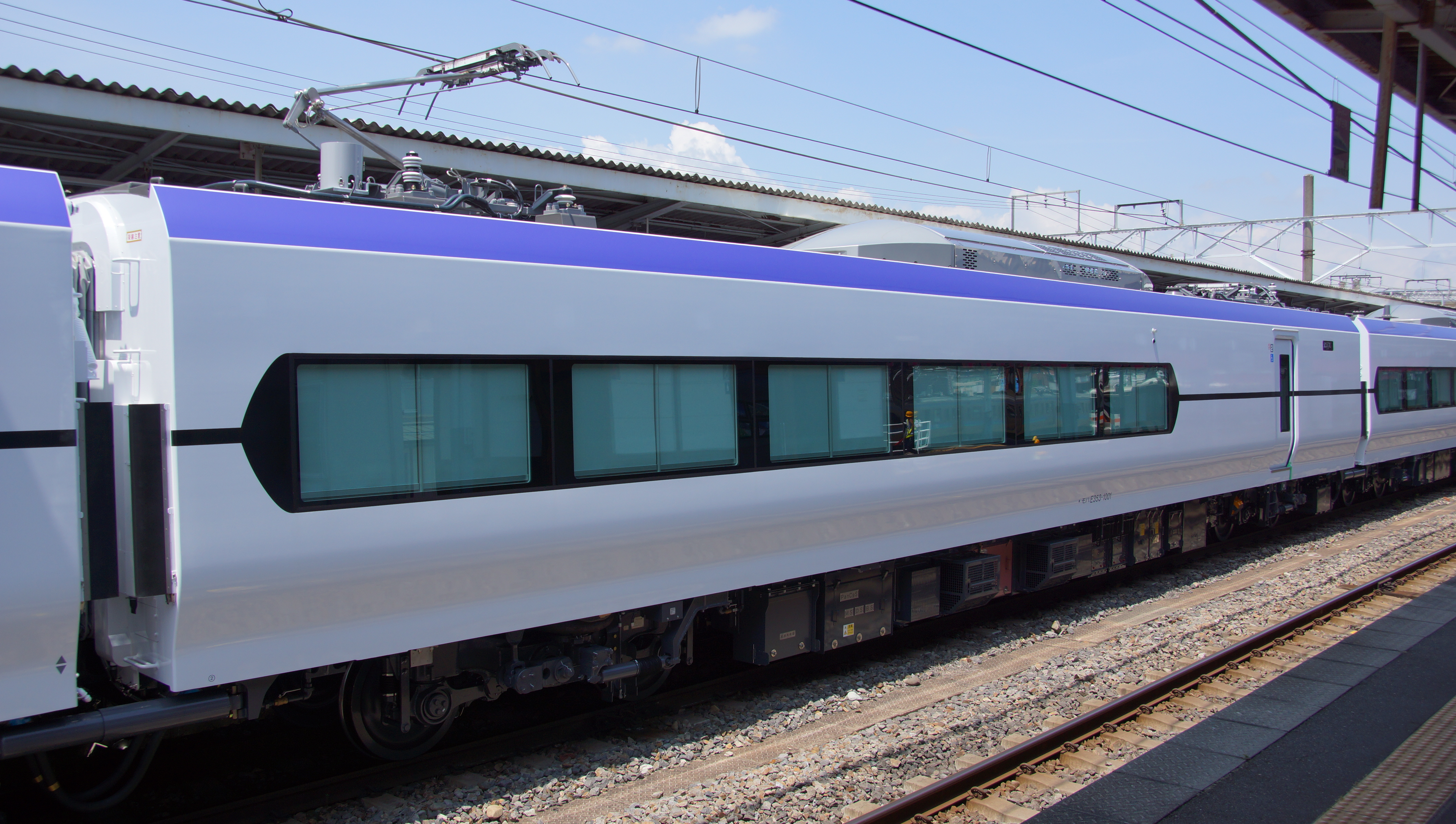
MoHa E353-1001 (car 2)

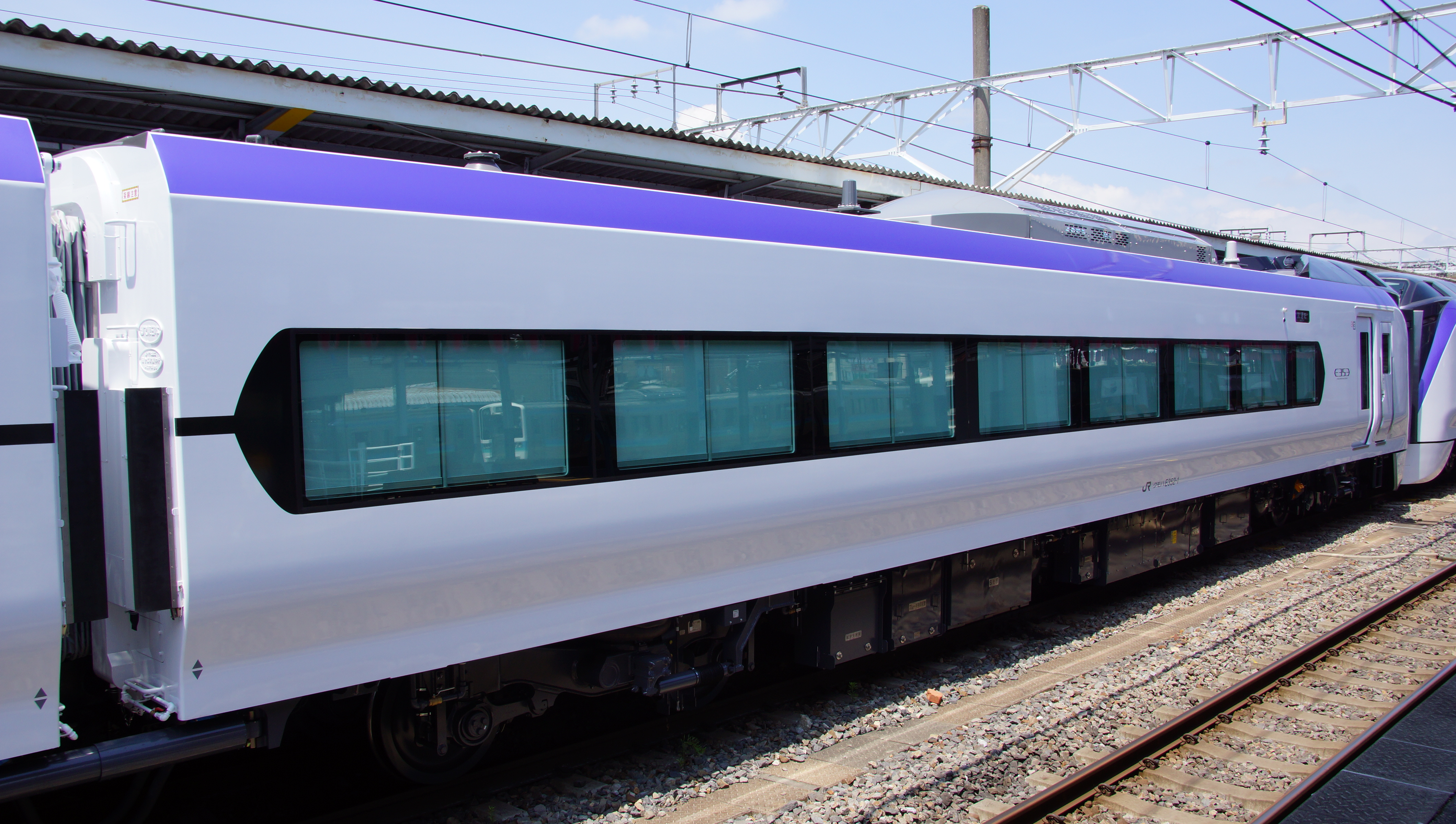
KuMoHa E352-1 (car 3)

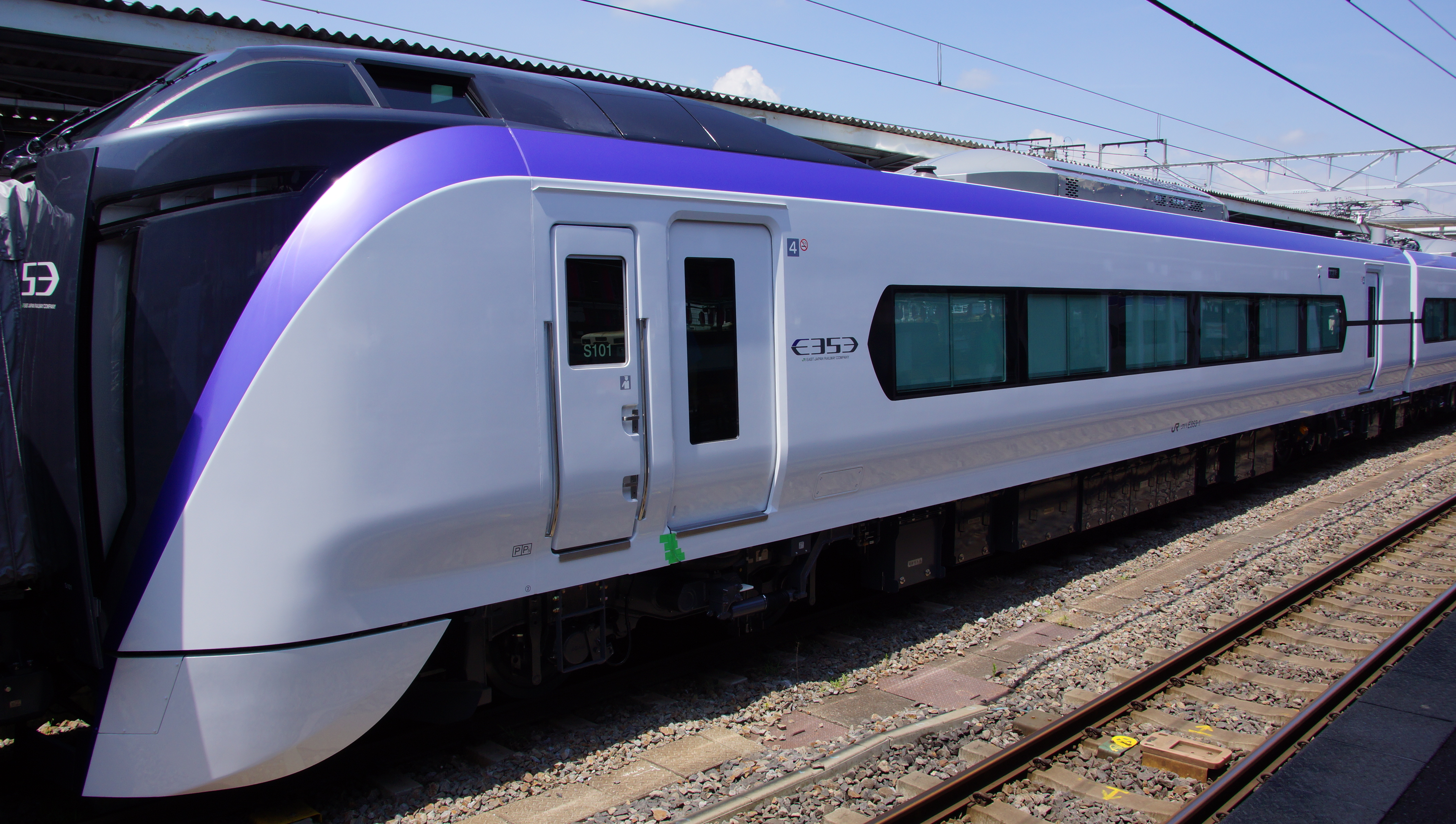
KuHa E353-1 (car 4)

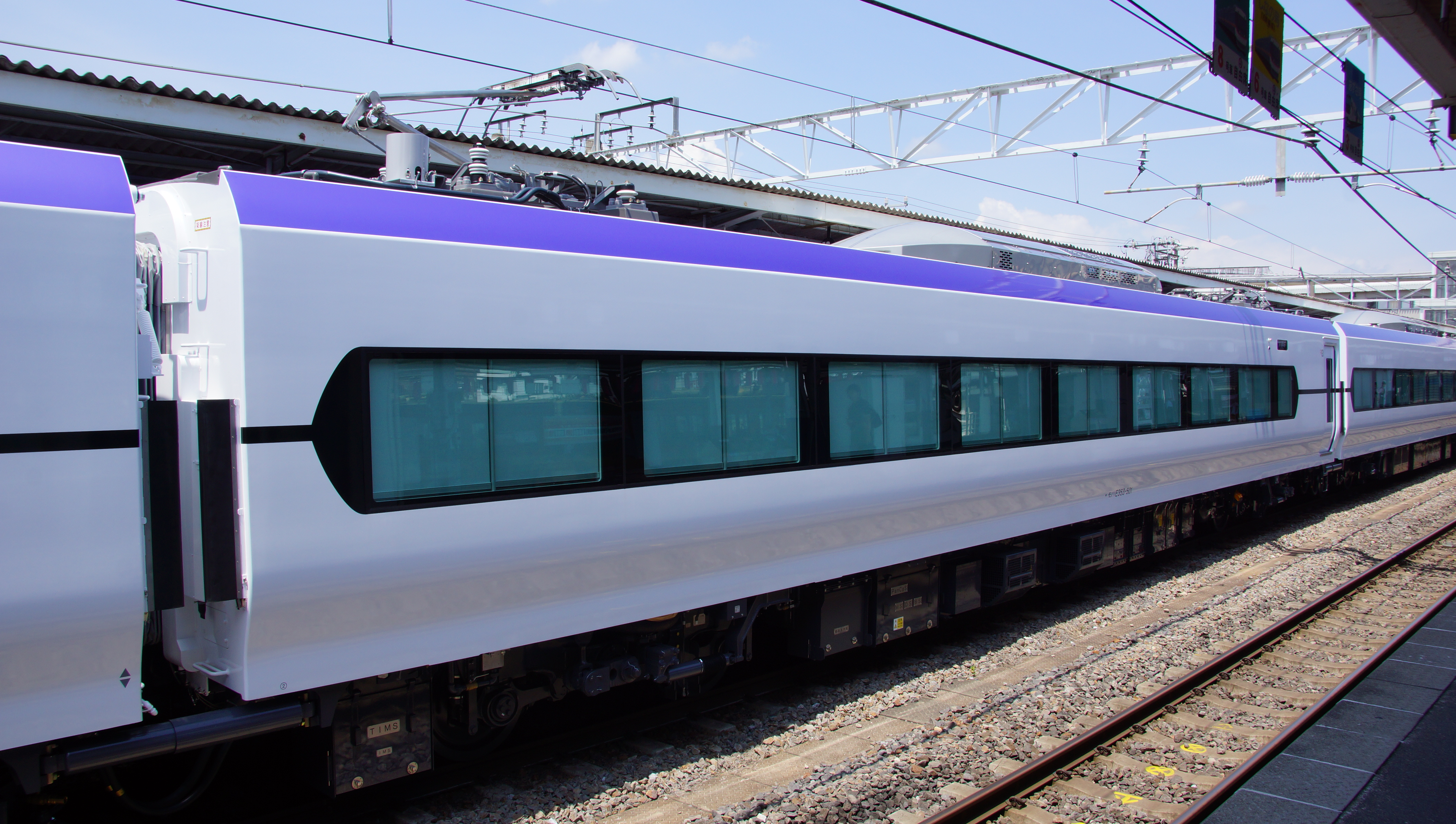
MoHa E353-501 (car 5)

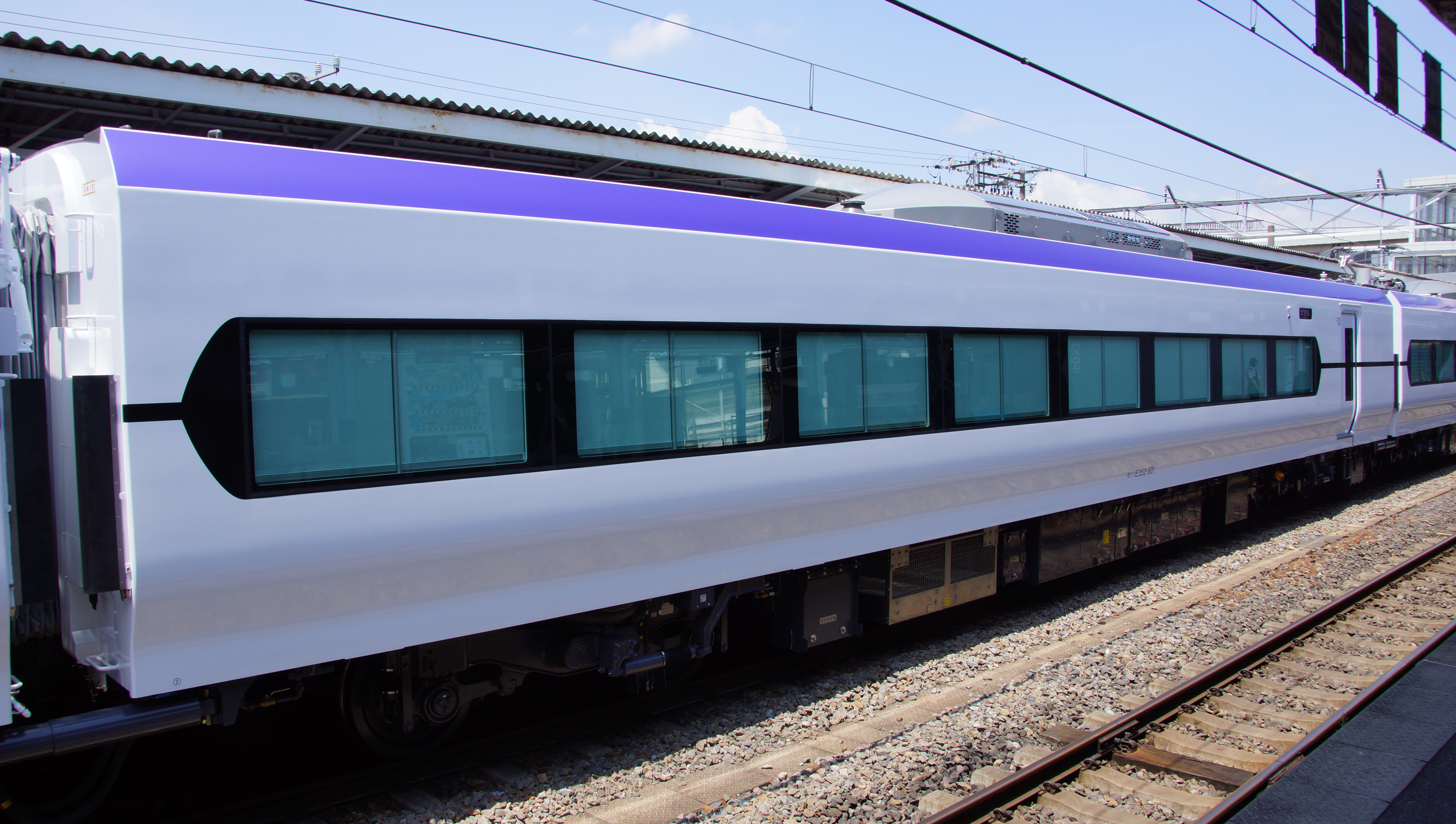
MoHa E352-501 (car 6)

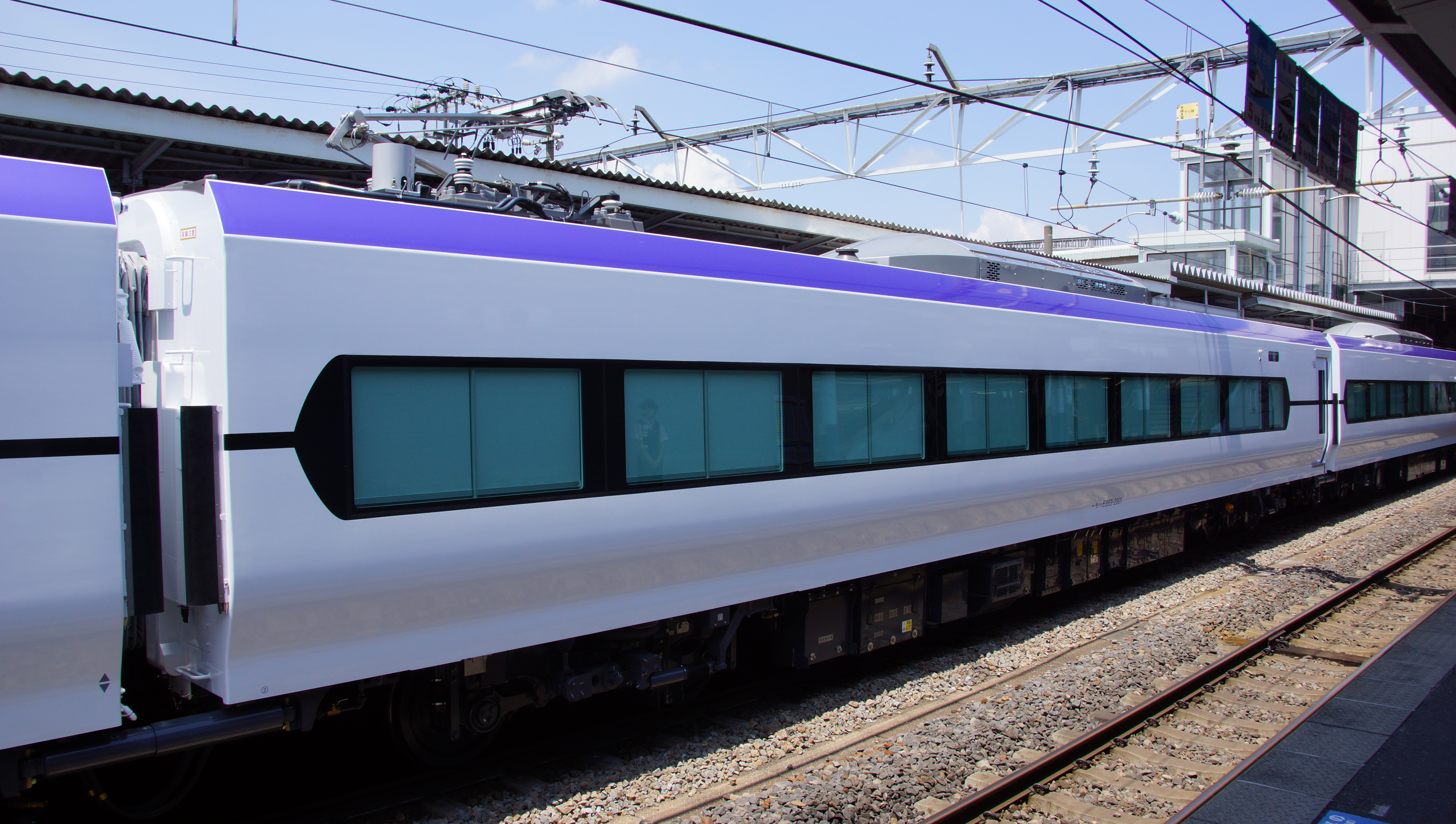
MoHa E353-2001 (car 7)

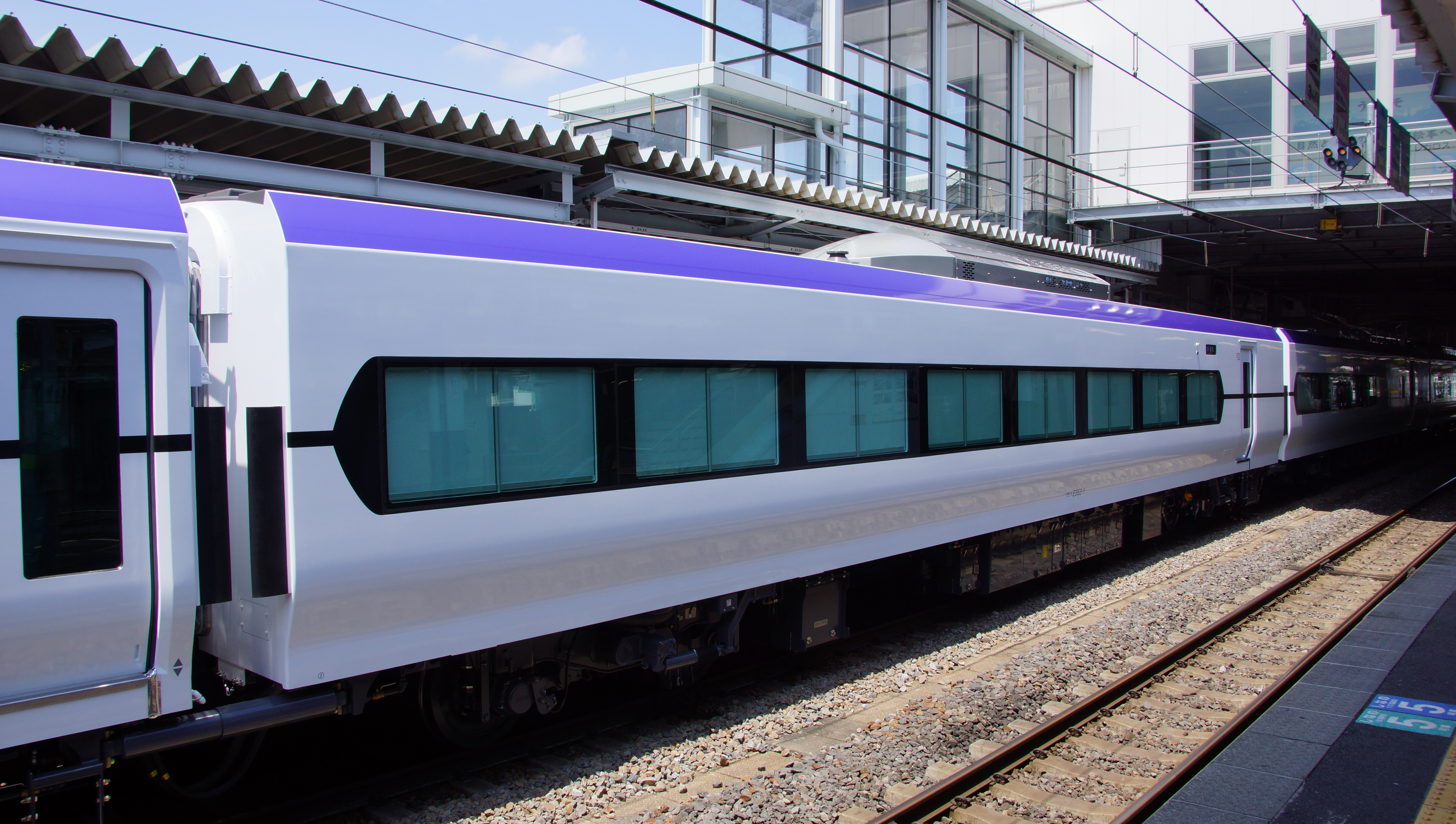
SaHa E353-1 (car 8)

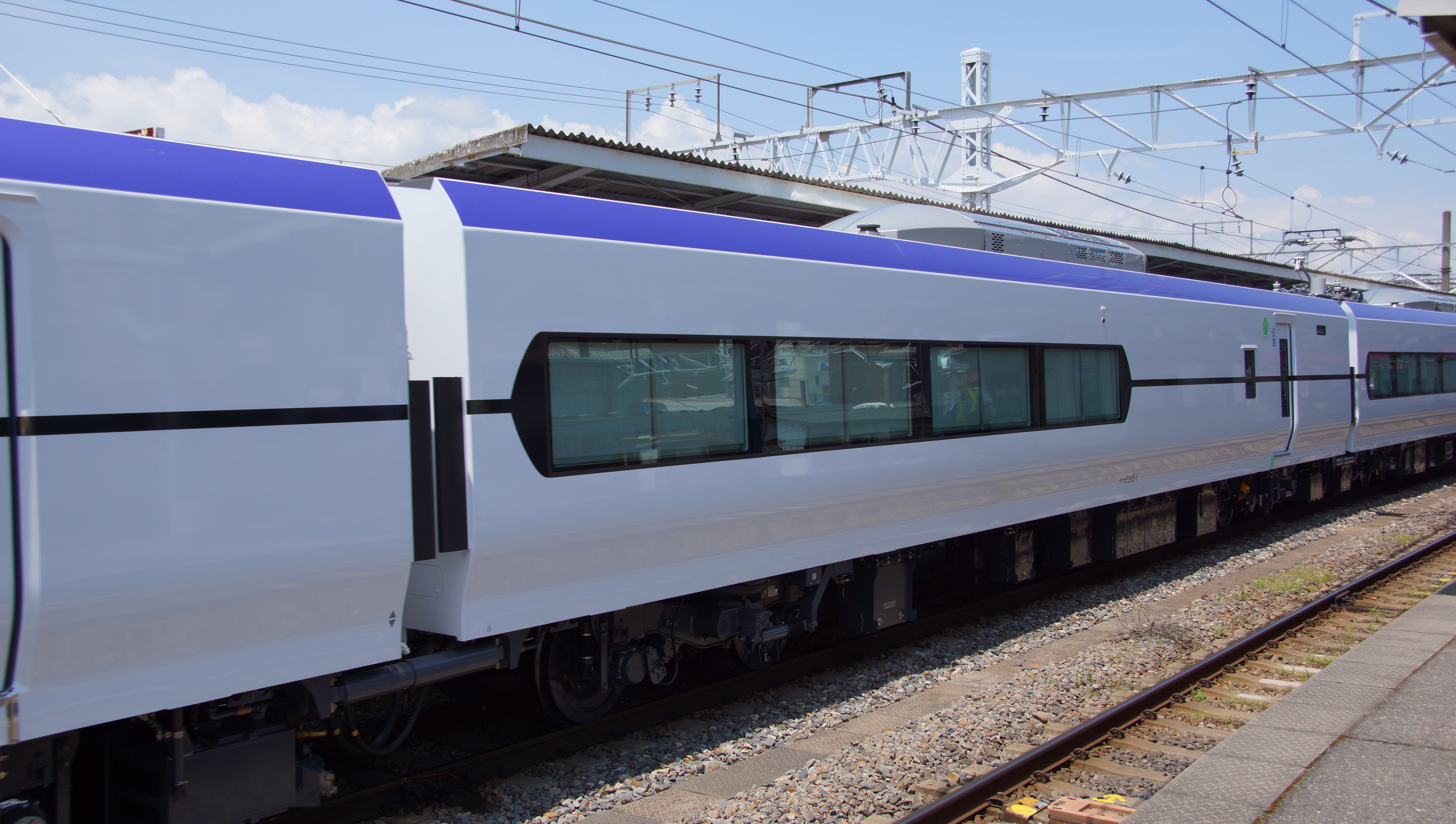
SaRo E353-1 (car 9)

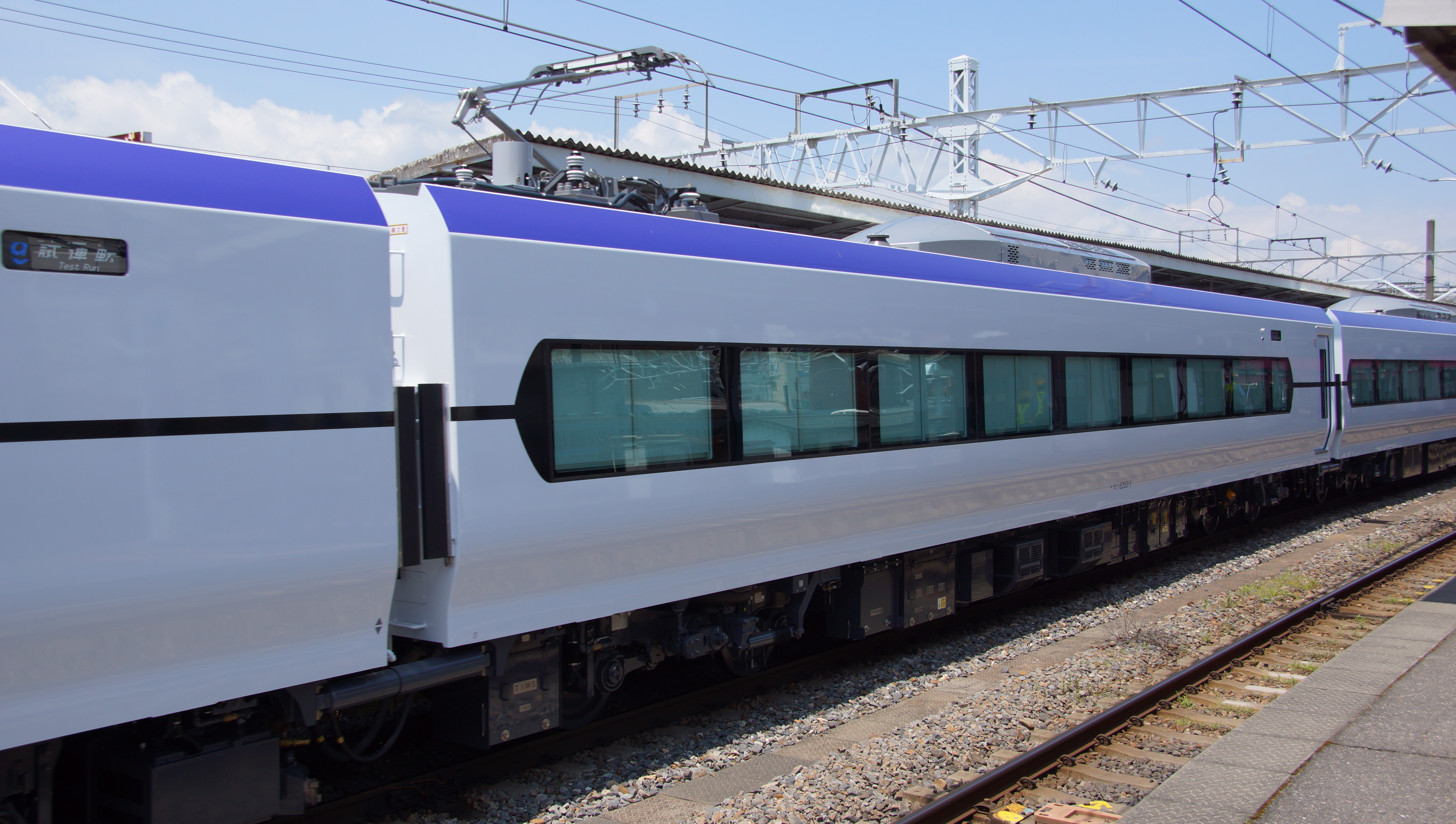
MoHa E353-1 (car 10)

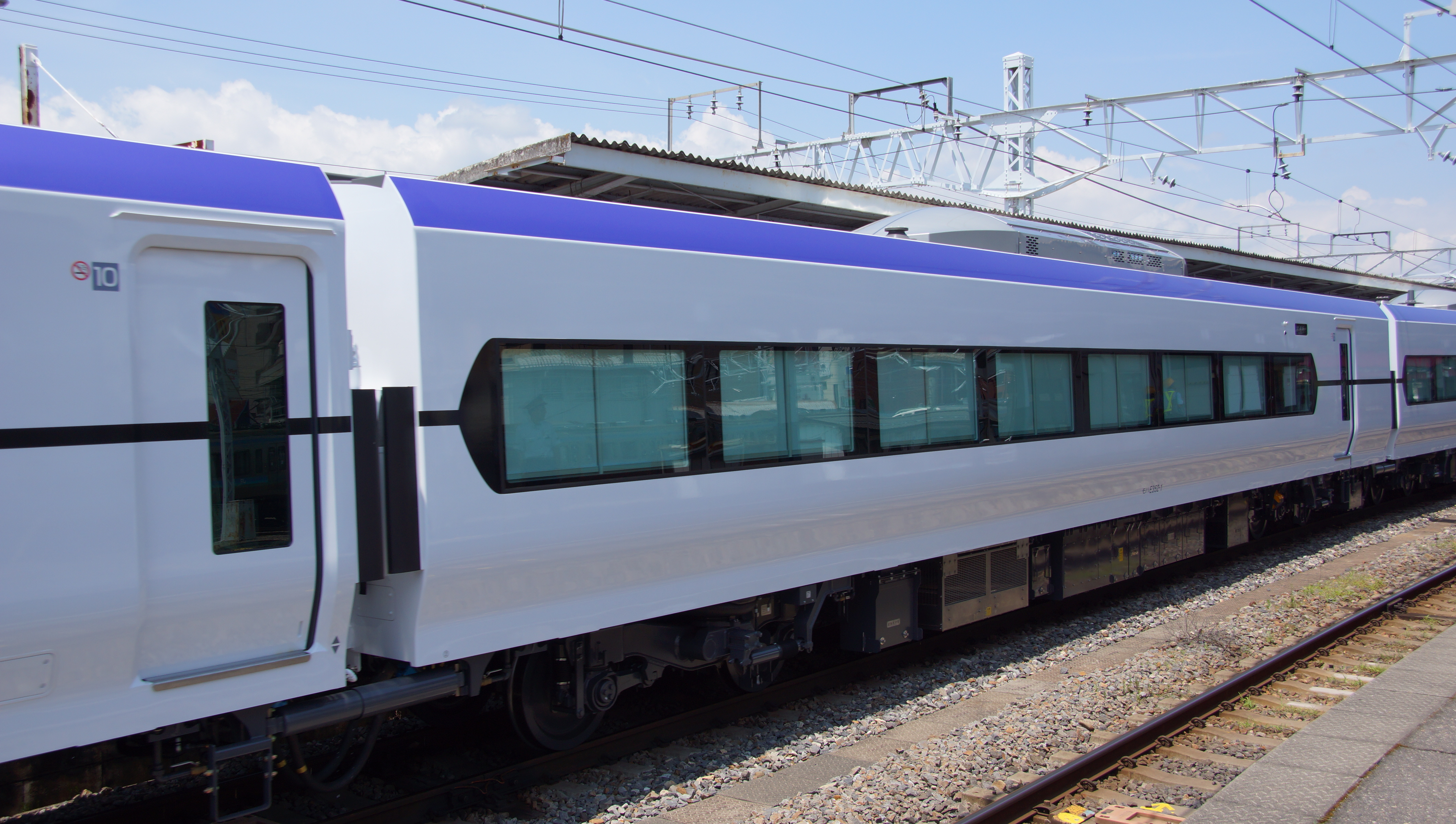
MoHa E352-1 (car 11)

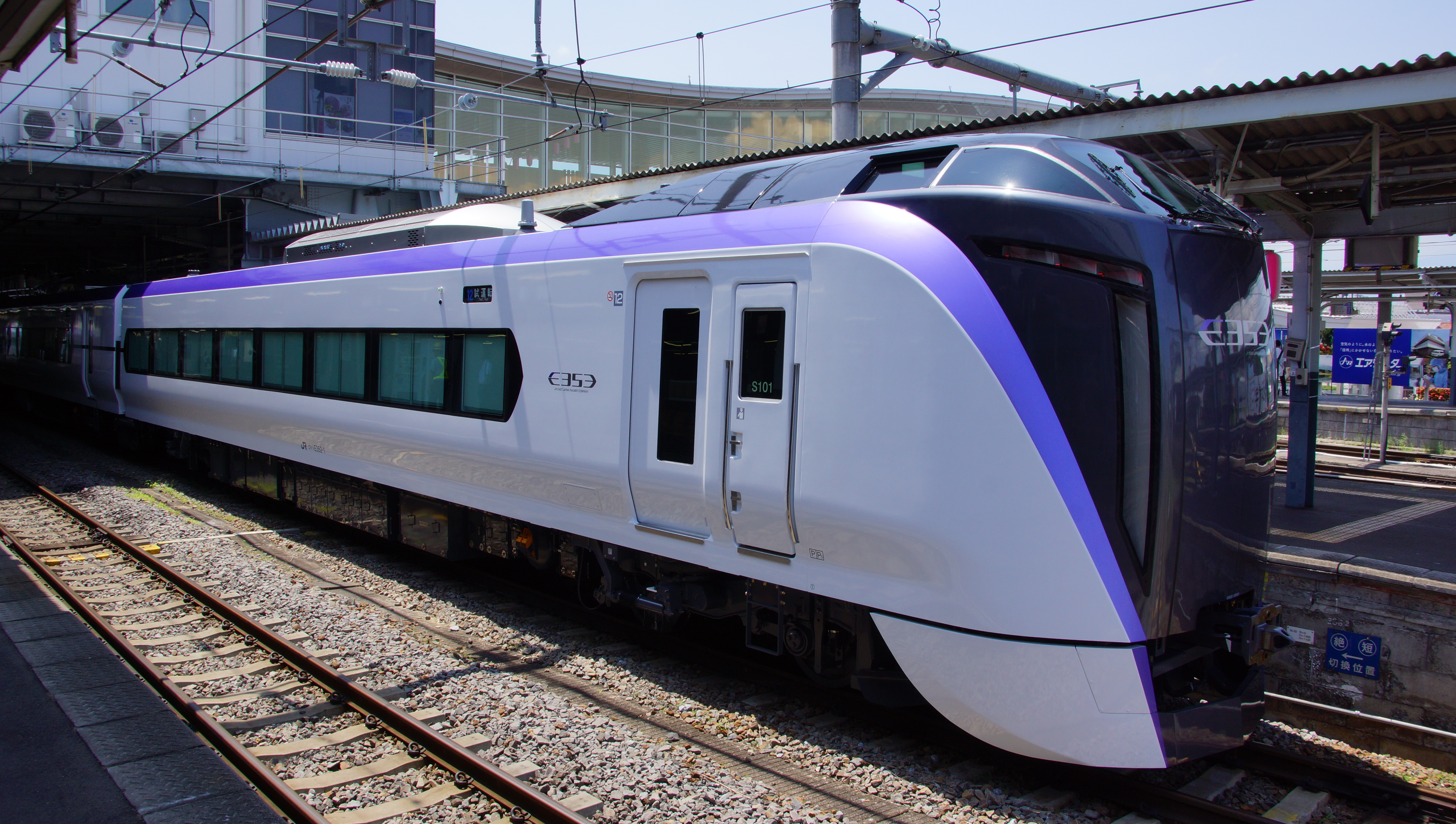
KuHa E352-1 (car 12)

Cars 2 and 5 each have two single-arm pantographs (only one is normally used), and cars 7 and 10 each have one. Cars 1 and 3 each have only one motored bogie (at the inner ends).

== Interior ==
Green car (first class) accommodation is in 2+2 abreast configuration with a seat pitch of 1,160 mm (46 in). The wine red seat covers are intended to create subdued atmosphere. Standard class is also arranged 2+2 with a seat pitch of 960 mm (37.8 in), compared to 970 mm (38.2 in) for Super Azusa E351 series trains. The pale blue seat covers are intended to evoke images of the Azusa River, after which the train service was named. AC power outlets are provided at each seat. The trains include universal access toilets and security cameras. LED lighting is used on these trains, for the first time on JR East limited express rolling stock.

While not initially included in the pre-series train, luggage racks are installed in cars 1, 3, 5, 7, 9, 10, and 12.

Inside, the floors feature rubber coverings to reduce the noise of footsteps. Individual seat numbers are written in braille and each seat has an individual air diffuser for passenger comfort. The cars also feature air purifiers using ozone to reduce unpleasant odors.

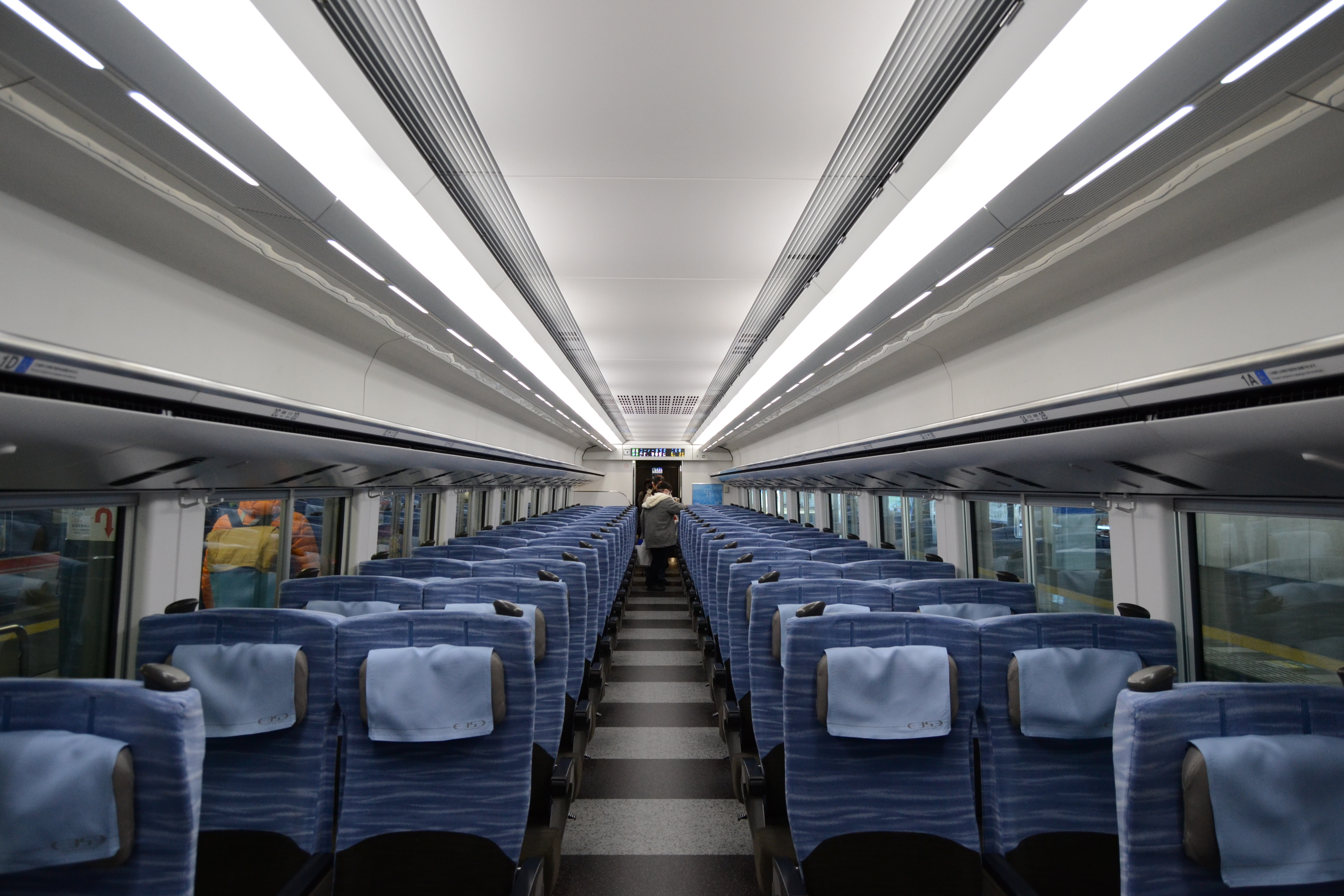
The interior of an ordinary-class car in January 2018

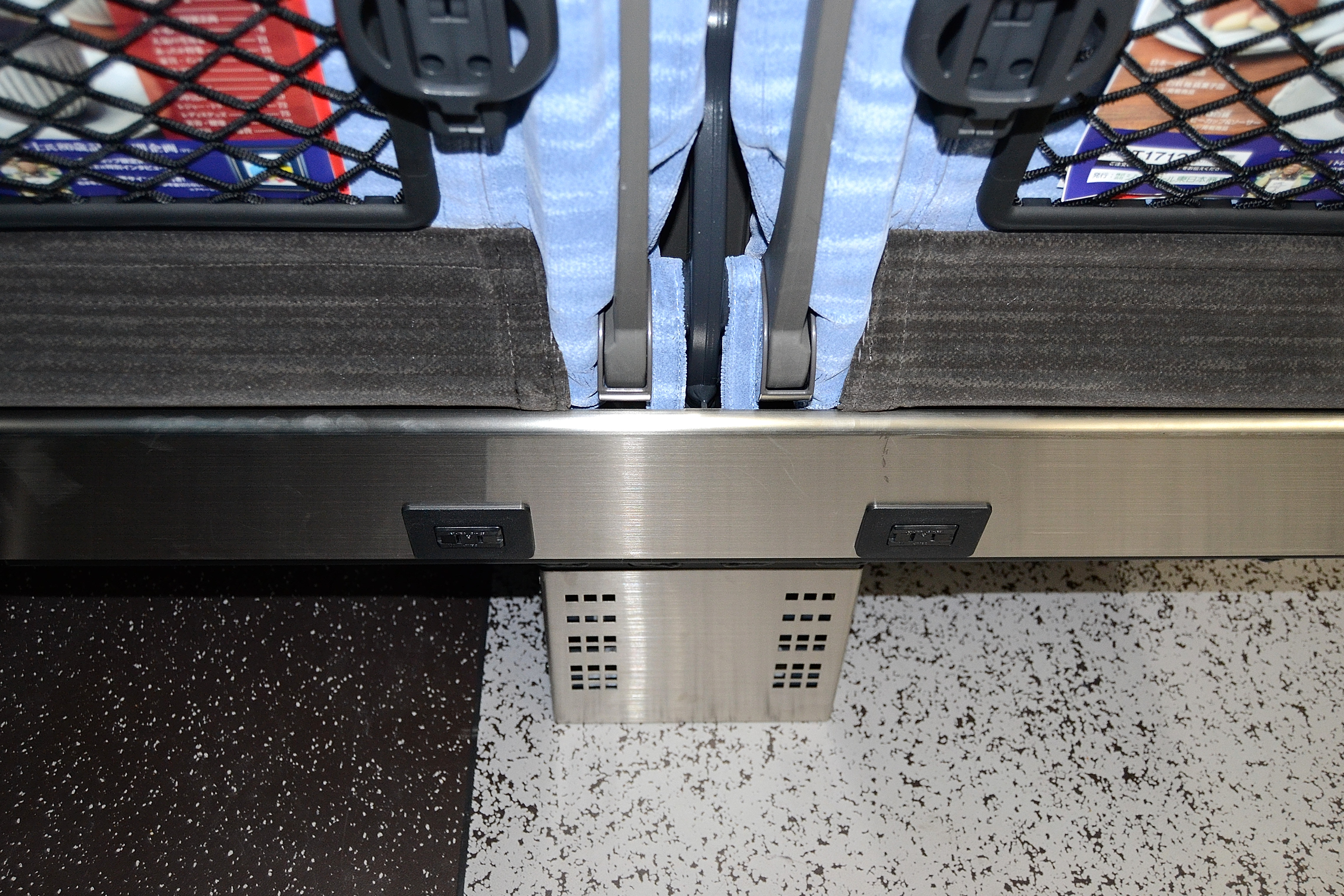
AC power outlets inside an ordinary-class car in January 2018

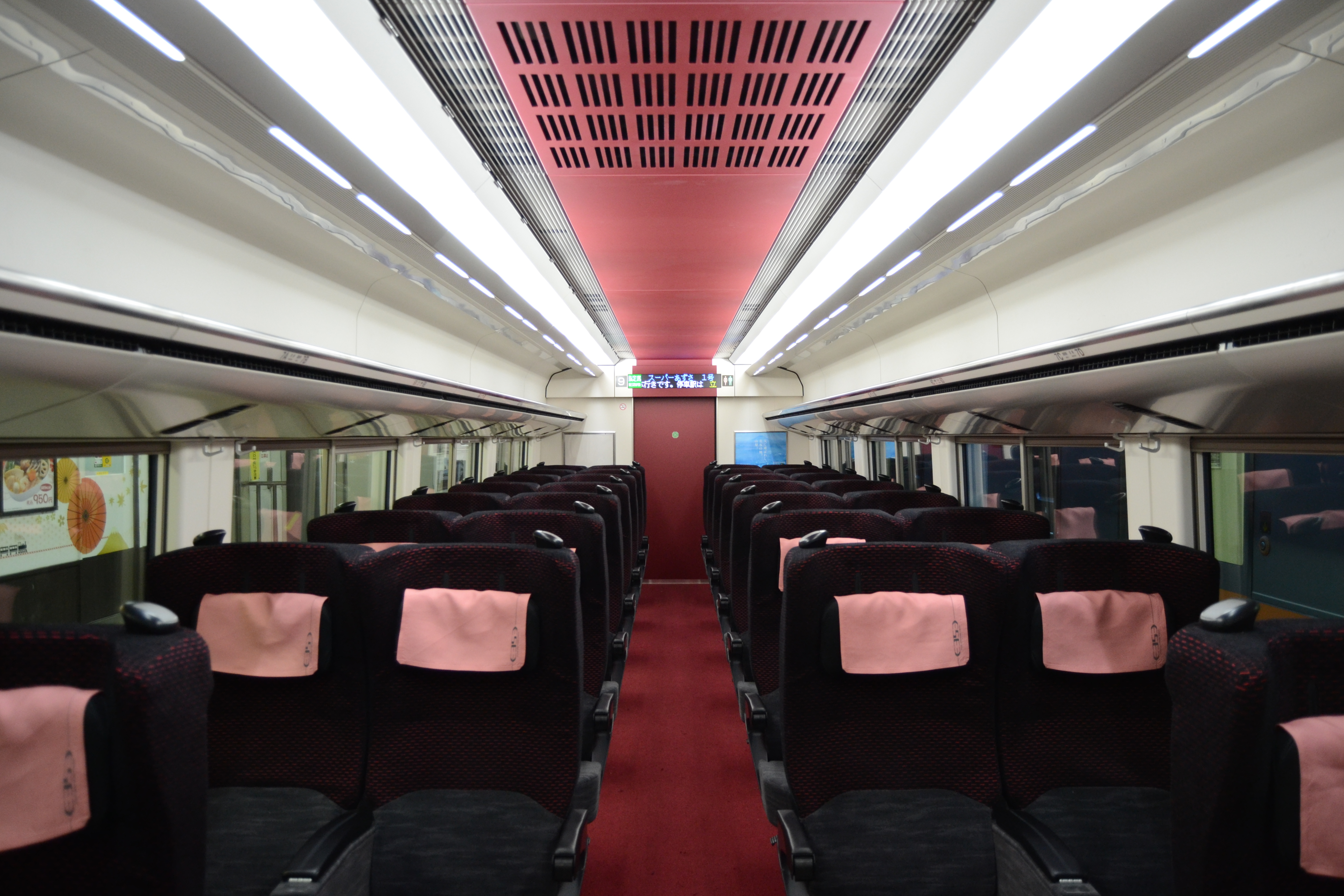
The interior of a Green car in January 2018

=== Toilets ===
Cars 1, 2, 4, 6, 8, 9, and 11 have toilet facilities as follows.

Car No.	Urinal	Western-style WC	Universal-access WC	Washroom
1	◌	◌		◌
2			◌	◌
4	◌	◌		◌
6	◌	◌		◌
8	◌	◌		◌
9	◌		◌	◌
11	◌	◌		◌

== History ==
Details of the new trains on order were first officially announced by JR East in February 2014.

The first trainset, consisting of one nine-car and one three-car set, was delivered from the Japan Transport Engineering Company (J-TREC) factory in Yokohama to Matsumoto Depot in July 2015. Mainline test running started on 29 July 2015. The pre-series train was formally shown off to the media on 2 August 2015.

As of June 2017, the train was still undergoing test running.

In October 2017, JR East announced that the first trains would enter revenue service on Super Azusa services from 23 December 2017, by which date three pairs of (9+3-car) trainsets would be available.

The trains were awarded the 2018 Laurel Prize by the Japan Railfan Club.

From the start of the revised timetable on 17 March 2018, all Super Azusa services were operated by E353 series trains.

Beginning on 1 July 2018, E353 series trains began replacing the E257 series trainsets used on Azusa and Kaiji services. With the start of the 16 March 2019 timetable revision, all Azusa and Kaiji services were operated with E353 series trains. In addition, three-car E353 series trainsets were deployed on Fuji Excursion services, which operate between Shinjuku and Kawaguchiko on the Fujikyuko Line. These services are coupled with nine-car Kaiji services between Shinjuku and Ōtsuki.

== Build details ==
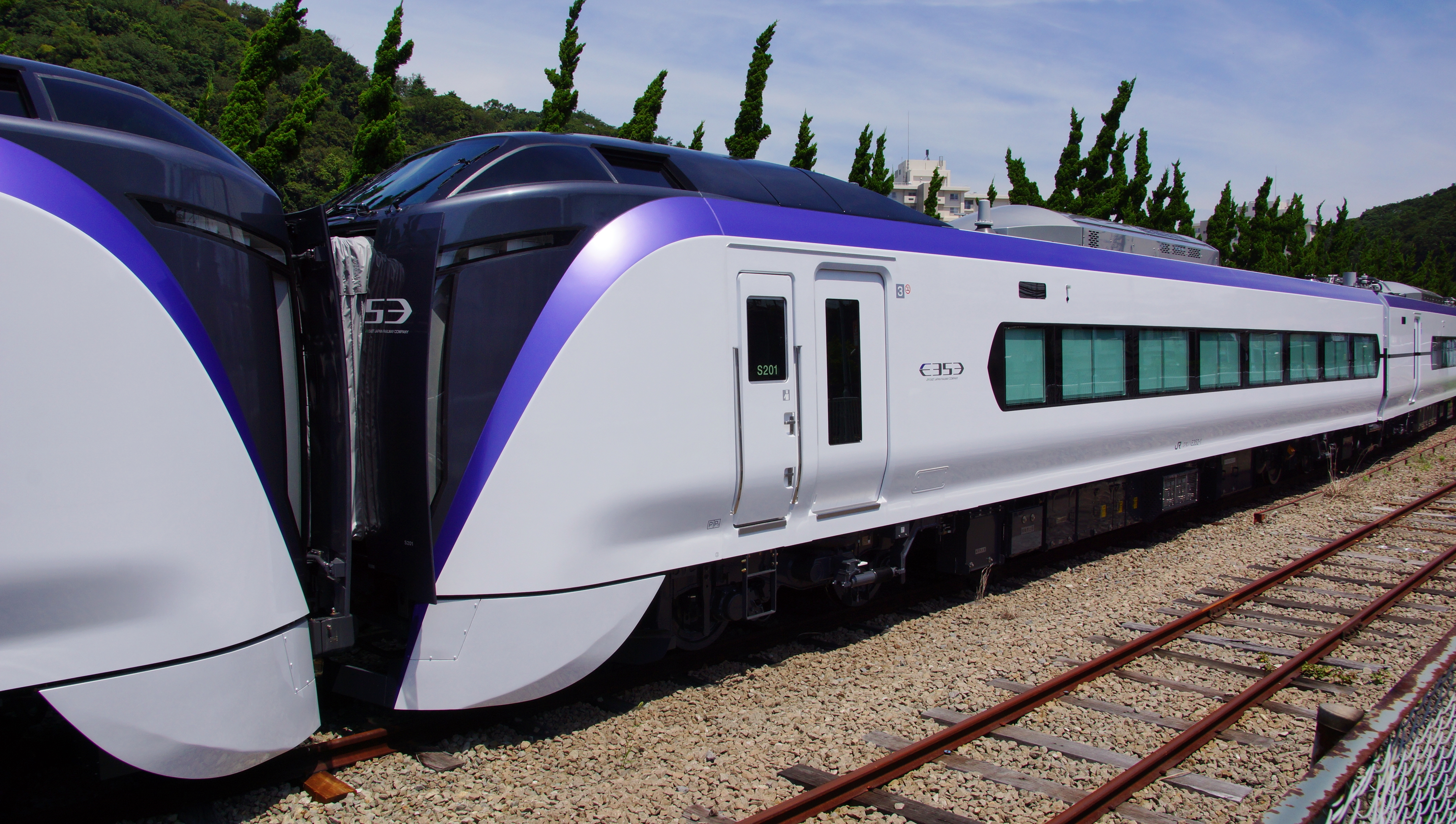
Pre-series sets S101 and S201 next to Jimmuji Station on delivery from the J-TREC factory in Yokohama in July 2015

The manufacturer and delivery dates for the fleet are as shown below.

Set No.	Date delivered
S101	29 July 2015
S102	15 October 2017
S103	8 November 2017
S104	20 December 2017
S201	29 July 2015
S202	15 October 2017
S203	8 November 2017
S204	20 December 2017
