= Hosono =

Hosono may refer to

- Hosono (surname)
- Hosono House, solo album by Haruomi Hosono
- Hosono Station, a railway station in Matsukawa, Nagano Prefecture, Japan
- Kita-Hosono Station, a railway station in Matsukawa, Nagano Prefecture, Japan
- Hōsono Station, a railway station in Seika, Kyoto Prefecture, Japan
- Shin-Hōsono Station, a railway station in Seika, Kyoto Prefecture, Japan
