= Azumi-Kutsukake Station =

Railway station in Ōmachi, Nagano Prefecture, Japan

Ōito Line26 Azumi-Kutsukake Station 安曇沓掛駅
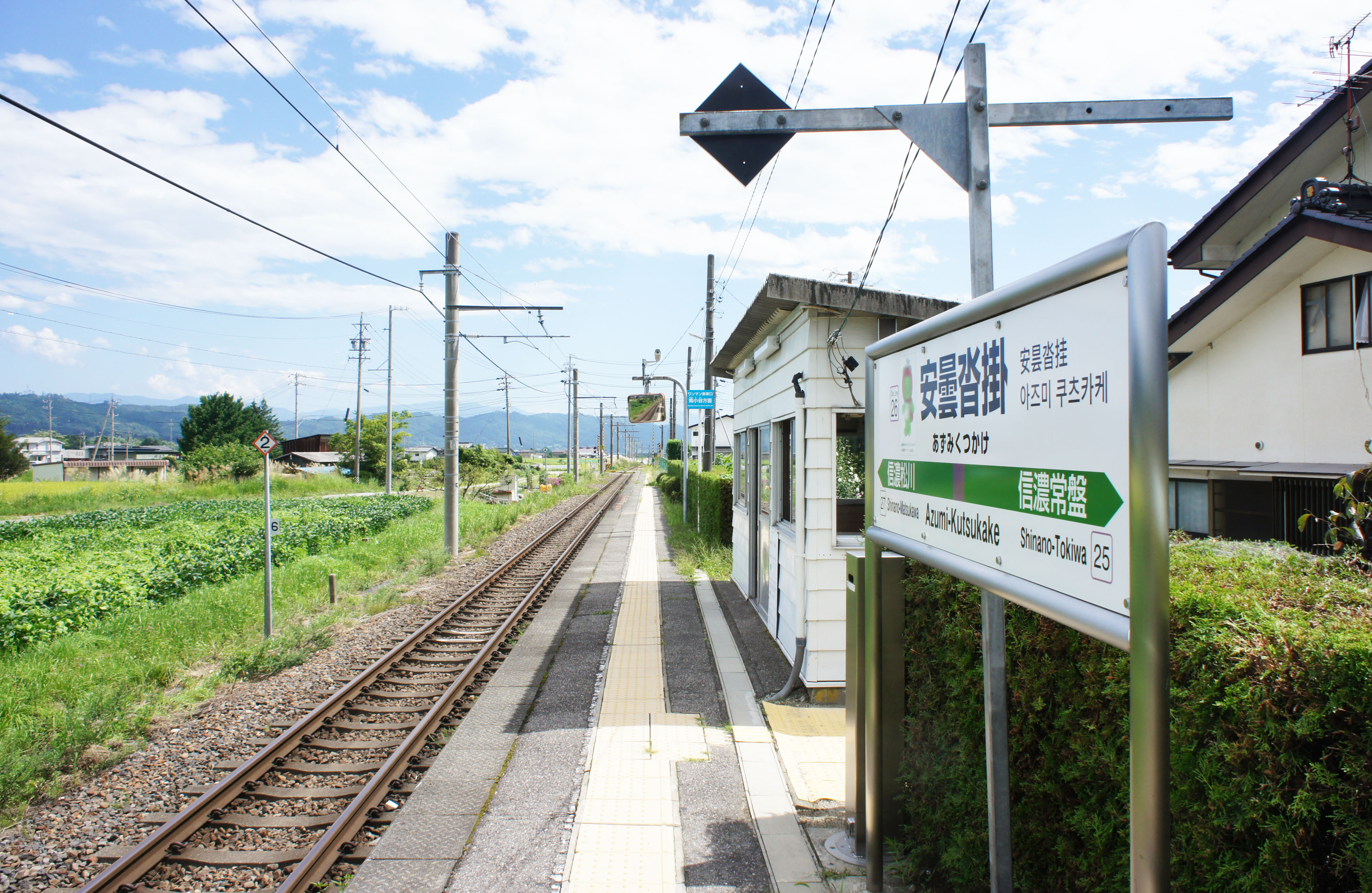
- Azumi-Kutsukake Station in August 2021

General information
- Location: Tokiw-Sunuma, Ōmachi-shi, Nagano-ken 398-0004; Japan
- Coordinates: 36.4480°N 137.8547°E
- Elevation: 646.9 meters.
- Operator: JR East
- Line: ■ Ōito Line
- Distance: 28.6 km from Matsumoto
- Platforms: 1 side platform
- Tracks: 1

Other information
- Status: Unstaffed
- Station code: 26
- Website: Official website

History
- Opened: 2 November 1915
- Former names: Tokiwa-Kutsukake Station (to 1937)

Passengers
- FY2011: 113

Services
Preceding station	JR East	Following station
Shinano-Tokiwa 25 towards Minami-Otari	Ōito Line Local	Shinano-Matsukawa 27 towards Matsumoto
Location
- Location within Nagano Prefecture Location within Japan

Azumi-Kutsukake Station (安曇沓掛駅, Azumi-Kutsukake-eki) is a railway station in the city of Ōmachi, Nagano Prefecture, Japan, operated by East Japan Railway Company (JR East).

== Lines ==
Azumi-Kutsukake Station is served by the Ōito Line and is 28.6 kilometers from the terminus of the line at Matsumoto Station.

== Station layout ==
The station consists of one ground-level side platform serving a single bi-directional track. The station is unattended.

== History ==
Azumi-Kutsukake Station opened on 2 November 1915 as Tokiwa-Kutsukake Station (常盤沓掛駅). It was renamed to its present name on 1 June 1937. With the privatization of Japanese National Railways (JNR) on 1 April 1987, the station came under the control of JR East. The station building was remodelled in 2007.

== Surrounding area ==
- Takase River
- National Route 147
- Nishina Shinmei Shrine

== See also ==
- List of railway stations in Japan
