= Matsukawa, Nagano (Kitaazumi) =

Matsukawa 松川村
- Village
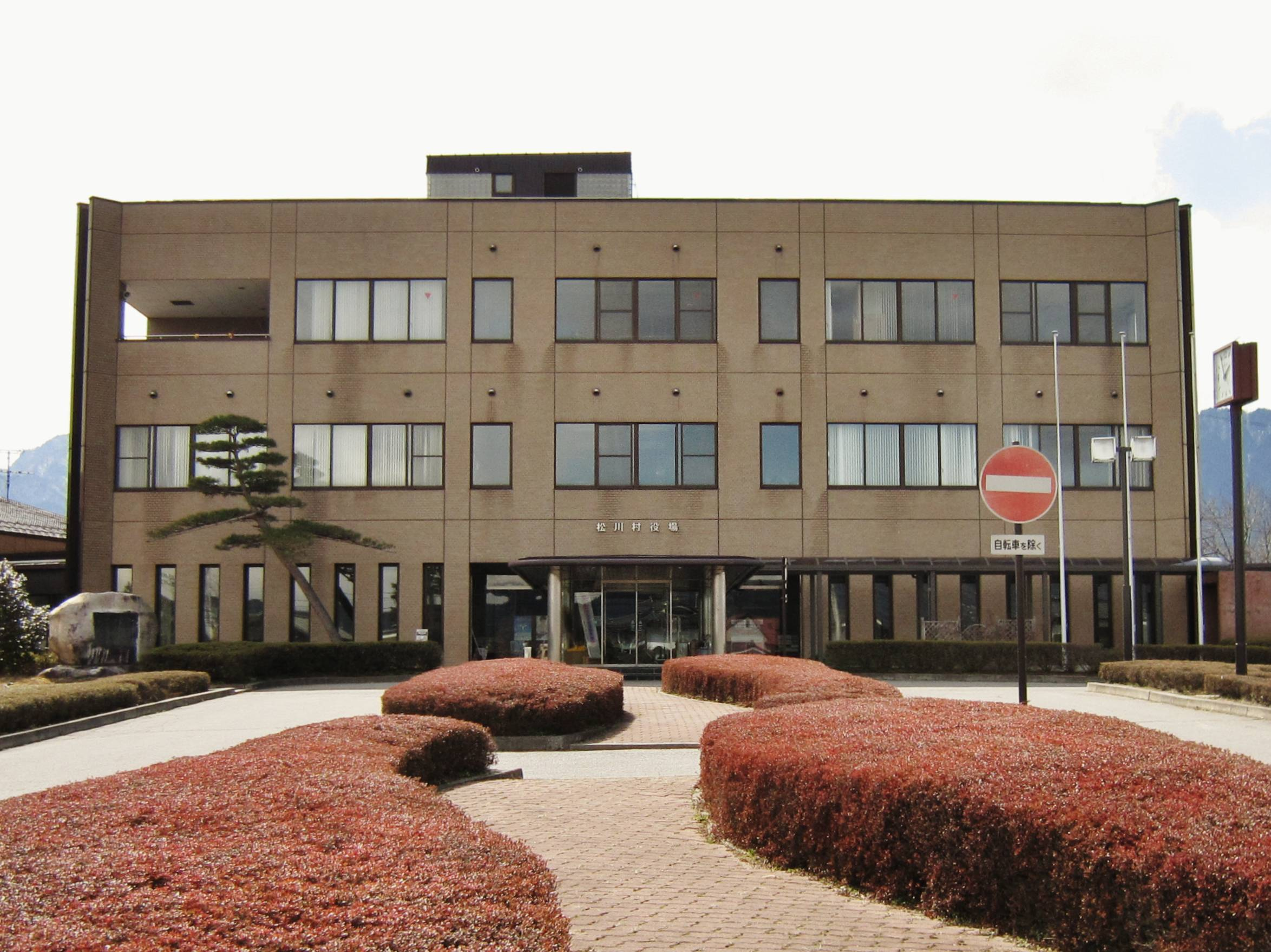
- Matsukawa Village Hall

- Flag Seal

- Location of Matsukawa Village in Nagano Prefecture

- Coordinates: 36°25′26.3″N 137°51′16.5″E
- Country: Japan
- Region: Chūbu (Kōshin'etsu)
- Prefecture: Nagano
- District: Kitaazumi

Area
  - Total: 47.07 km^{2} (18.17 sq mi)

Population (April 2019)
  - Total: 9,689
  - Density: 205.8/km^{2} (533.1/sq mi)
- Time zone: UTC+9 (Japan Standard Time)
- Symbols
  - Tree: Pinus densiflora
  - Flower: Rhododendron
- Phone number: 0261-62-3111
- Address: 76-5, Matsukawa-mura, Kitaazumi-gun, Nagano-ken 399-8501
- Website: Official website

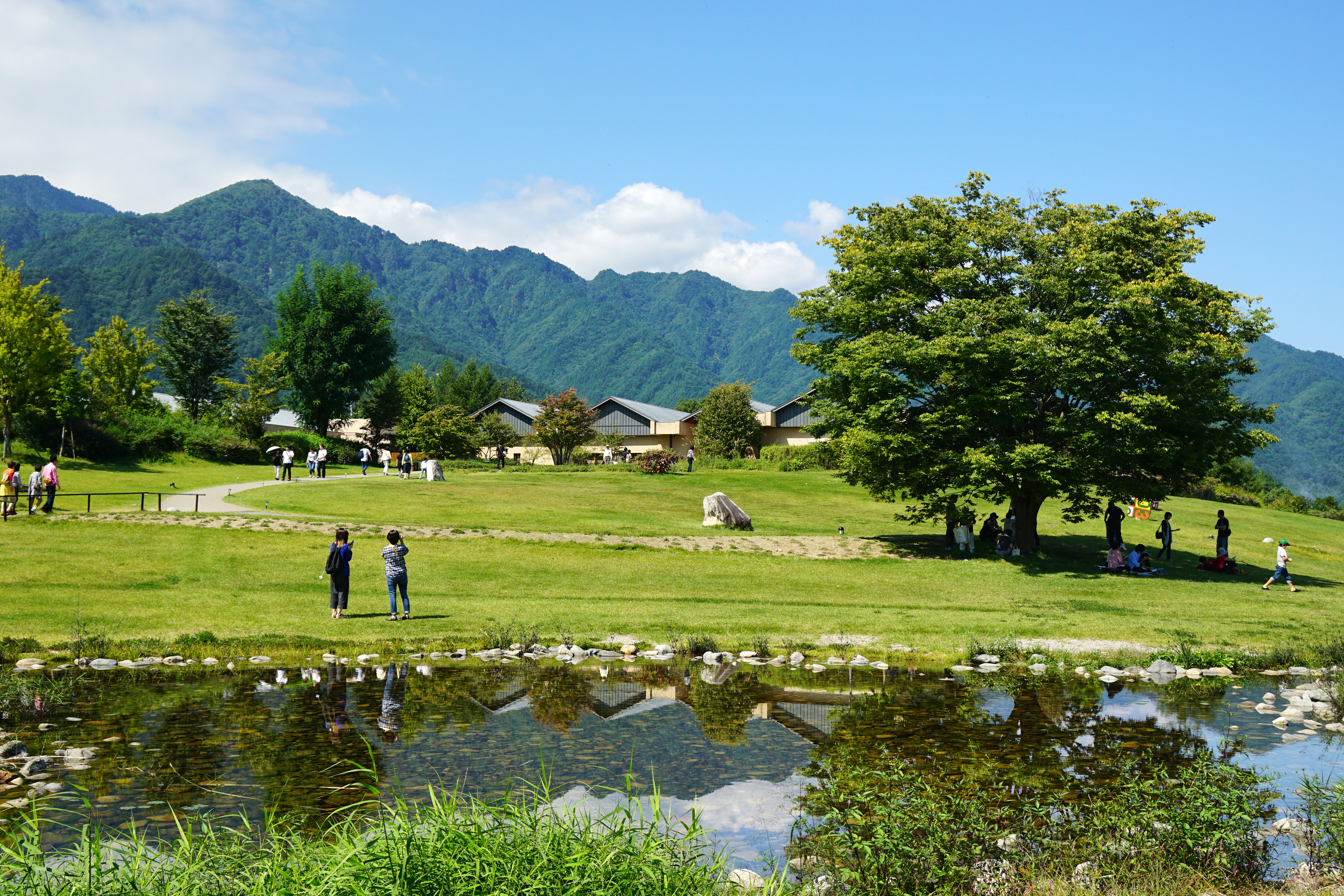
Chihiro Art Museum in Matsukawa

Matsukawa (松川村, Matsukawa-mura) is a village located in Nagano Prefecture, Japan. As of 1 April 2019, the village had an estimated population of 9,689 in 3813 households, and a population density of 210 persons per km^{2}. The total area of the village is 47.07 square kilometres (18.17 sq mi).

== Geography ==
Matsukawa is located in northwestern Nagano Prefecture, in the Azumidaira plateau, bordered by the Hida Mountains to the north and west.

=== Surrounding municipalities ===
- Nagano Prefecture
  - Azumino
  - Ikeda
  - Ōmachi

=== Climate ===
The village has a climate characterized by characterized by hot and humid summers, and cold winters (Köppen climate classification Cfa). The average annual temperature in Matsukawa is 10.1 °C. The average annual rainfall is 1278 mm with September as the wettest month. The temperatures are highest on average in August, at around 23.4 °C, and lowest in January, at around -2.4 °C.

== Demographics ==
Per Japanese census data, the population of Matsukawa has recently plateaued after a long period of growth.

Historical population
Year	Pop.	±%
1940	4,176	—
1950	5,912	+41.6%
1960	6,200	+4.9%
1970	6,342	+2.3%
1980	7,496	+18.2%
1990	8,337	+11.2%
2000	9,701	+16.4%
2010	10,093	+4.0%
2020	9,599	−4.9%

== History ==
The area of present-day Matsukawa was part of ancient Shinano Province and was part of the territory controlled by Matsumoto Domain under the Tokugawa shogunate of the Edo period. The modern village of Matsukawa was established on April 1, 1889, by the establishment of the municipalities system.

== Education ==
Matsukawa has one public elementary school and one public middle school operated by the village government. The village does not have a high school.

== Transportation ==
=== Railway ===
- East Japan Railway Company – Ōito Line
  - Hosono - Kita-Hosono - Shinano-Matsukawa

=== Highway ===
- National Route 114

== International relations ==
- – Lukang, Changhua, Taiwan, friendship city
