= Ikeda, Nagano =

Ikeda 池田町
- Town
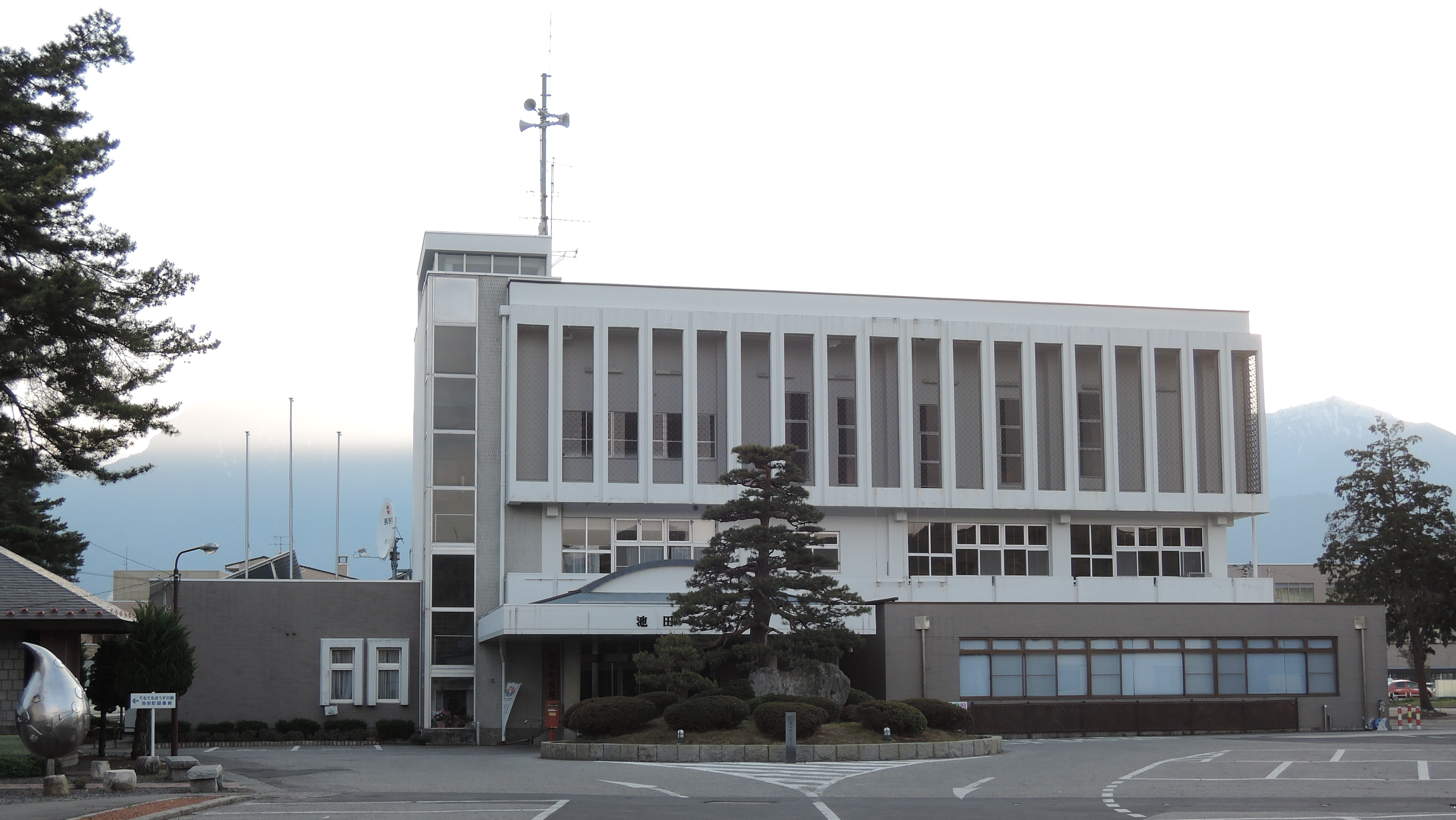
- Ikeda Town Hall

- Flag Emblem

- Location of Ikeda in Nagano Prefecture

- Coordinates: 36°25′16.4″N 137°52′28.5″E
- Country: Japan
- Region: Chūbu (Kōshin'etsu)
- Prefecture: Nagano
- District: Kitaazumi

Area
  - Total: 40.16 km^{2} (15.51 sq mi)

Population (October 2020)
  - Total: 9,382
  - Density: 233.6/km^{2} (605.1/sq mi)
- Time zone: UTC+9 (Japan Standard Time)
- Symbols
  - Tree: Pinus densiflora
  - Flower: Azalea
- Phone number: 0261-62-3131
- Address: 3203-6 Ikeda, Ikeda-machi, Kitaazumi-gun, Nagano-ken 399-8696
- Website: Official website

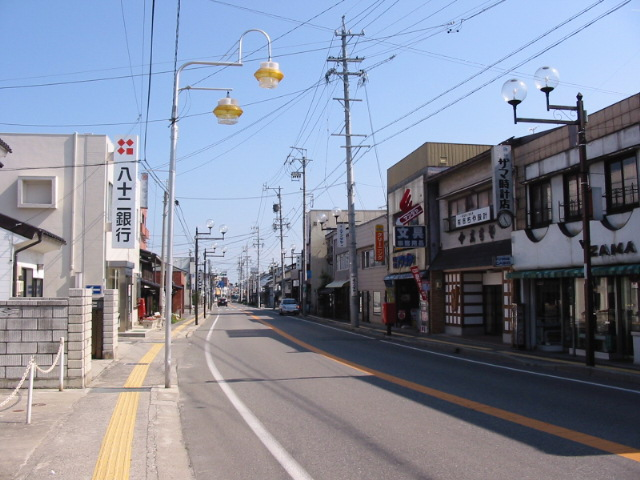
R51 in Ikeda Town

Ikeda (池田町, Ikeda-machi) is a town located in Nagano Prefecture, Japan. As of 1 April 2019, the town had an estimated population of 9,793 in 3947 households, and a population density of 247 persons per km^{2}. The total area of the town is 40.16 square kilometres (15.51 sq mi). Ikeda is listed as one of The Most Beautiful Villages in Japan.

== Geography ==
Ikeda is located in north-central Nagano Prefecture.

=== Surrounding municipalities ===
- Nagano Prefecture
  - Azumino
  - Ikusaka
  - Matsukawa
  - Ōmachi

=== Climate ===
The town has a climate characterized by hot and humid summers, and cold winters (Köppen climate classification Cfa). The average annual temperature in Ikeda is 10.9 °C. The average annual rainfall is 1185 mm with September as the wettest month. The temperatures are highest on average in August, at around 24.3 °C, and lowest in January, at around -1.7 °C.

== Demographics ==
Per Japanese census data, the population of Ikeda has remained relatively steady over the past 50 years.

Historical population
Year	Pop.	±%
1960	11,250	—
1970	10,245	−8.9%
1980	10,610	+3.6%
1990	10,521	−0.8%
2000	10,658	+1.3%
2010	10,332	−3.1%
2020	9,382	−9.2%

== History ==
The area of present-day Ikeda was part of ancient Shinano Province. Ikeda developed as a post station on the Chikukhi kaidō, a highway connecting inland regions of Shinano with the Sea of Japan at Itoigawa. The village of Ikedamachi was created with the establishment of the modern municipalities system on April 1, 1889. It was elevated to town status on April 1, 1915, as Ikeda. Ikeda annexed the neighboring village of Aisome on November 1, 1955.

== Education ==
Ikeda has two public elementary schools and one public middle school operated by the town government, and one public high school operated by the Nagano Prefectural Board of Education. The prefecture also operates a special education school.

== Transportation ==
=== Railway ===
- The town is not serviced by any passenger railway line

=== Highway ===
- The town is not on any national highway
