= Shinano-Tokiwa Station =

Railway station in Ōmachi, Nagano Prefecture, Japan

Ōito Line25 Shinano-Tokiwa Station 信濃常盤駅
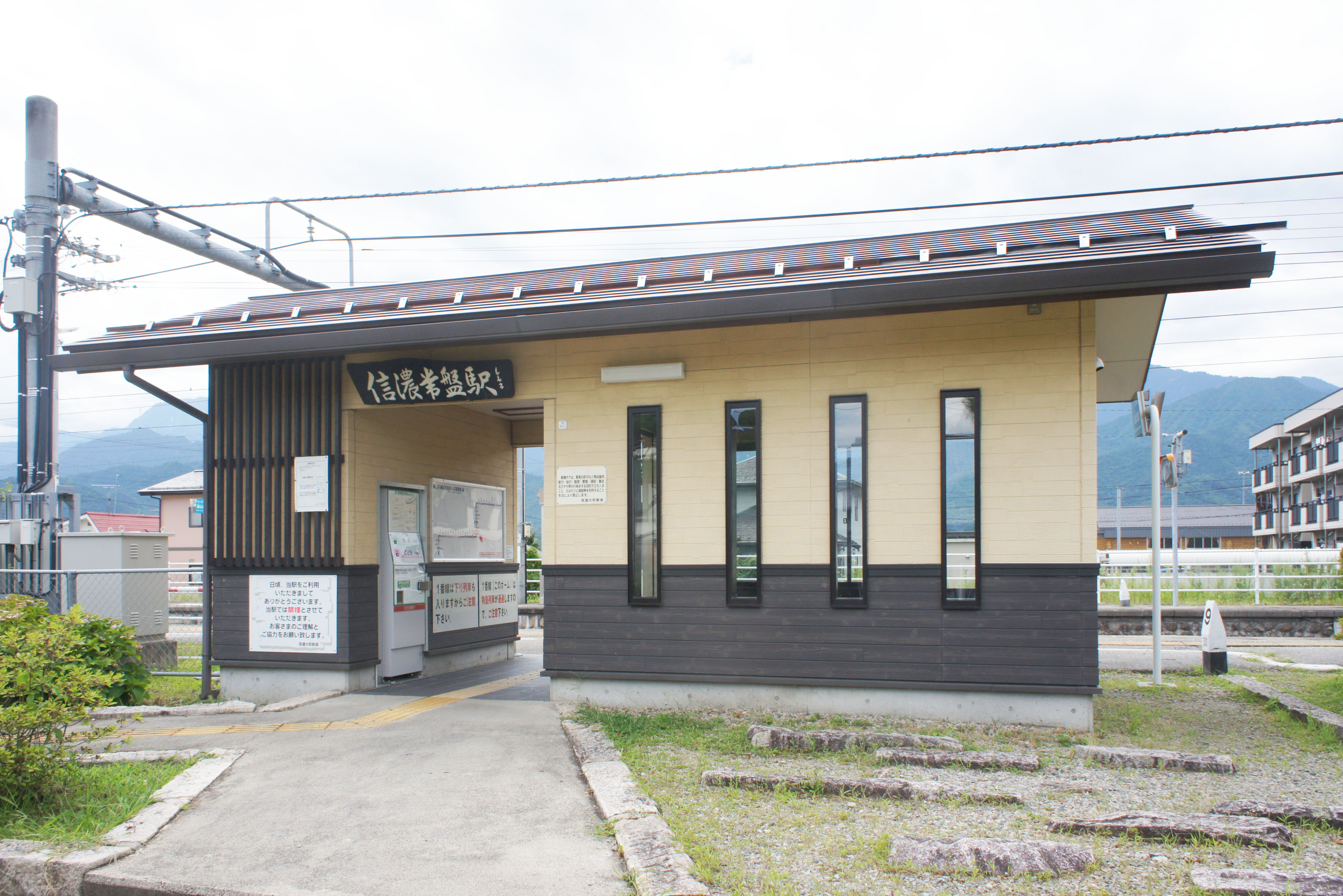
- Shinano-Tokiwa Station in August 2021

General information
- Location: Tokiwa-Shimoippongi, Ōmachi-shi, Nagano-ken 398-0004; Japan
- Coordinates: 36.4673°N 137.8469°E
- Elevation: 681.6 meters
- Operator: JR East
- Line: ■ Ōito Line
- Distance: 30.9 km from Matsumoto
- Platforms: 2 side platforms
- Tracks: 2

Other information
- Status: Unstaffed
- Station code: 25
- Website: Official website

History
- Opened: 2 November 1915
- Former names: Tokiwa Station (until 1937)

Passengers
- FY2011: 245

Services
Preceding station	JR East	Following station
Shinano-Ōmachi One-way operation	Ōito Line Rapid	Shinano-Matsukawa 27 towards Matsumoto
Minami-Ōmachi 24 towards Minami-Otari	Ōito Line Local	Azumi-Kutsukake 26 towards Matsumoto
Location
- Location within Nagano Prefecture Location within Japan

Shinano-Tokiwa Station (信濃常盤駅, Shinano-Tokiwa-eki) is a railway station on the Ōito Line in the city of Ōmachi, Nagano Prefecture, Japan, operated by East Japan Railway Company (JR East).

== Lines ==
Shinano-Tokiwa Station is served by the Ōito Line and is 30.9 kilometers from the starting point of the line at Matsumoto Station.

== Station layout ==
The station consists of two ground-level side platforms connected by a level crossing. The station is unattended.

=== Platforms ===
1	■ Ōito Line	for Hotaka, Toyoshina, and Matsumoto for Shinano-Ōmachi, Hakuba and Minami-Otari
2	■ Ōito Line	for Shinano-Ōmachi, Hakuba, and Minami-Otari

== History ==
Shinano-Tokiwa Station opened on 2 November 1915 as Tokiwa Station (常盤駅). It was renamed Shinano-Tokiwa on 1 June 1937. With the privatization of Japanese National Railways (JNR) on 1 April 1987, the station came under the control of JR East.

== Surrounding area ==
- Takase River
- National Route 147
- Omachi Minami Elementary School

== See also ==
- List of railway stations in Japan
