= Hosono Station =

Railway station in Matsukawa, Nagano Prefecture, Japan

Ōito Line29 Hosono Station 細野駅
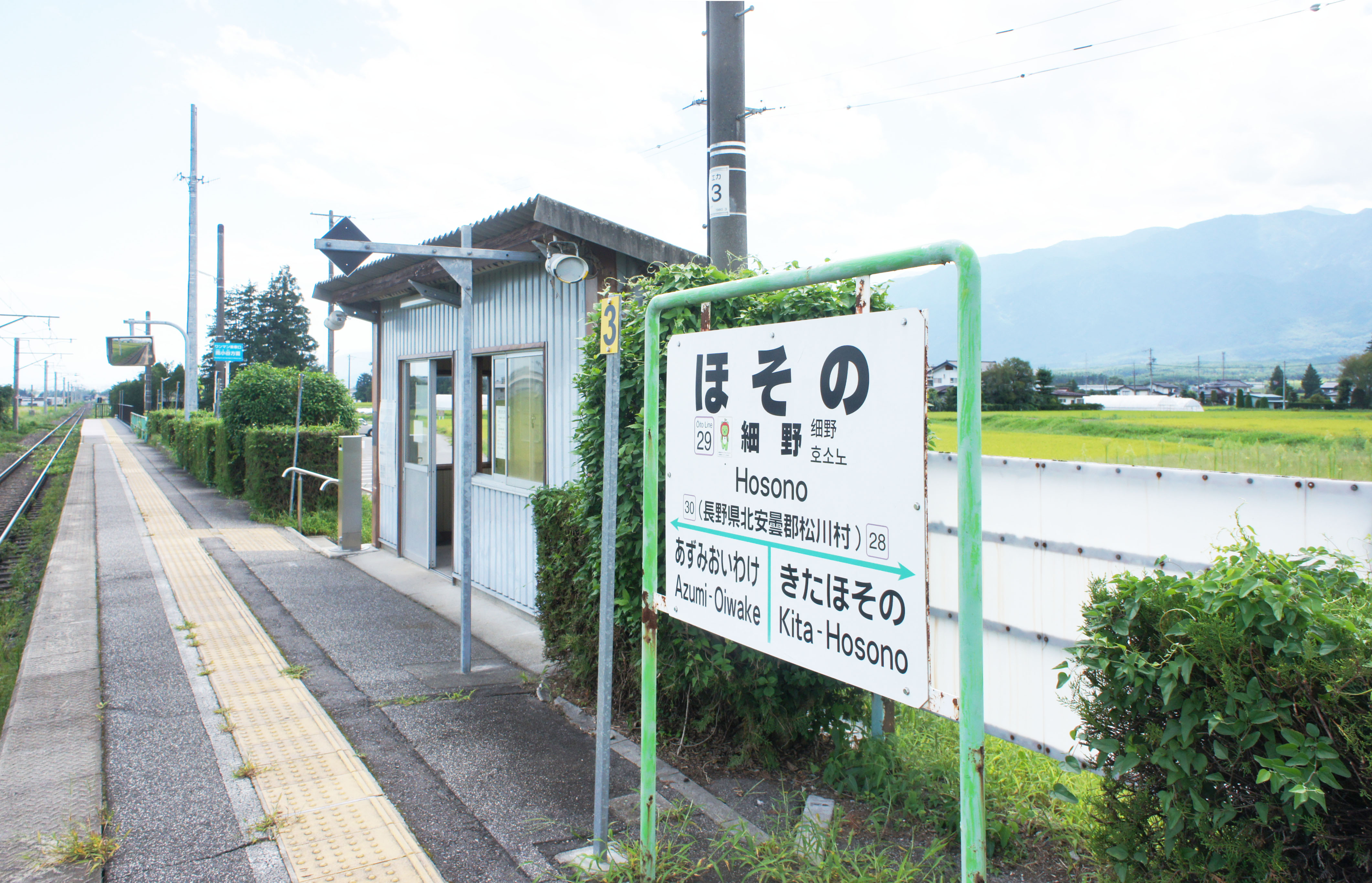
- Hosono Station, August 2021

General information
- Location: Higashi-Kawahara, Matsukawa-mura, Kitaazumi-gun, Nagano-ken 399-8501; Japan
- Coordinates: 36°23′49.91″N 137°51′56.36″E
- Elevation: 576.8 meters
- Operator: JR East
- Line: ■ Ōito Line
- Distance: 22.8 km from Matsumoto
- Platforms: 1 side platform

Other information
- Status: Unattended
- Station code: 29
- Website: Official website

History
- Opened: 29 September 1915

Passengers
- FY2011: 56

Services
Preceding station	JR East	Following station
Kita-Hosono 28 towards Minami-Otari	Ōito Line Local	Azumi-Oiwake 30 towards Matsumoto
Location
- Location within Nagano Prefecture Location within Japan

Hosono Station (細野駅, Hosono-eki) is a railway station in the village of Matsukawa, Nagano Prefecture, Japan, operated by East Japan Railway Company (JR East).

== Lines ==
Hosono Station is served by the Ōito Line and is 22.8 kilometers from the terminus of the line at Matsumoto Station.

== Station layout ==
The station consists of one ground-level side platform serving a single bi-directional track. The station is unattended.

== History ==
The station opened on September 29, 1915 when Shinano Railway extended the operation from Ariake Station to Ikeda-Matsukawa Station (present-day Shinano-Matsukawa Station). Shinano Railway was integrated into the Japanese Government Railways on June 1, 1937. With the privatization of Japanese National Railways (JNR) on April 1, 1987 the station came under the control of JR East.

== Surrounding area ==
- National Route 147

== See also ==
- List of railway stations in Japan
