= Shinano-Matsukawa Station =

Railway station in Matsukawa, Nagano Prefecture, Japan

Ōito Line27 Shinano-Matsukawa Station 信濃松川駅
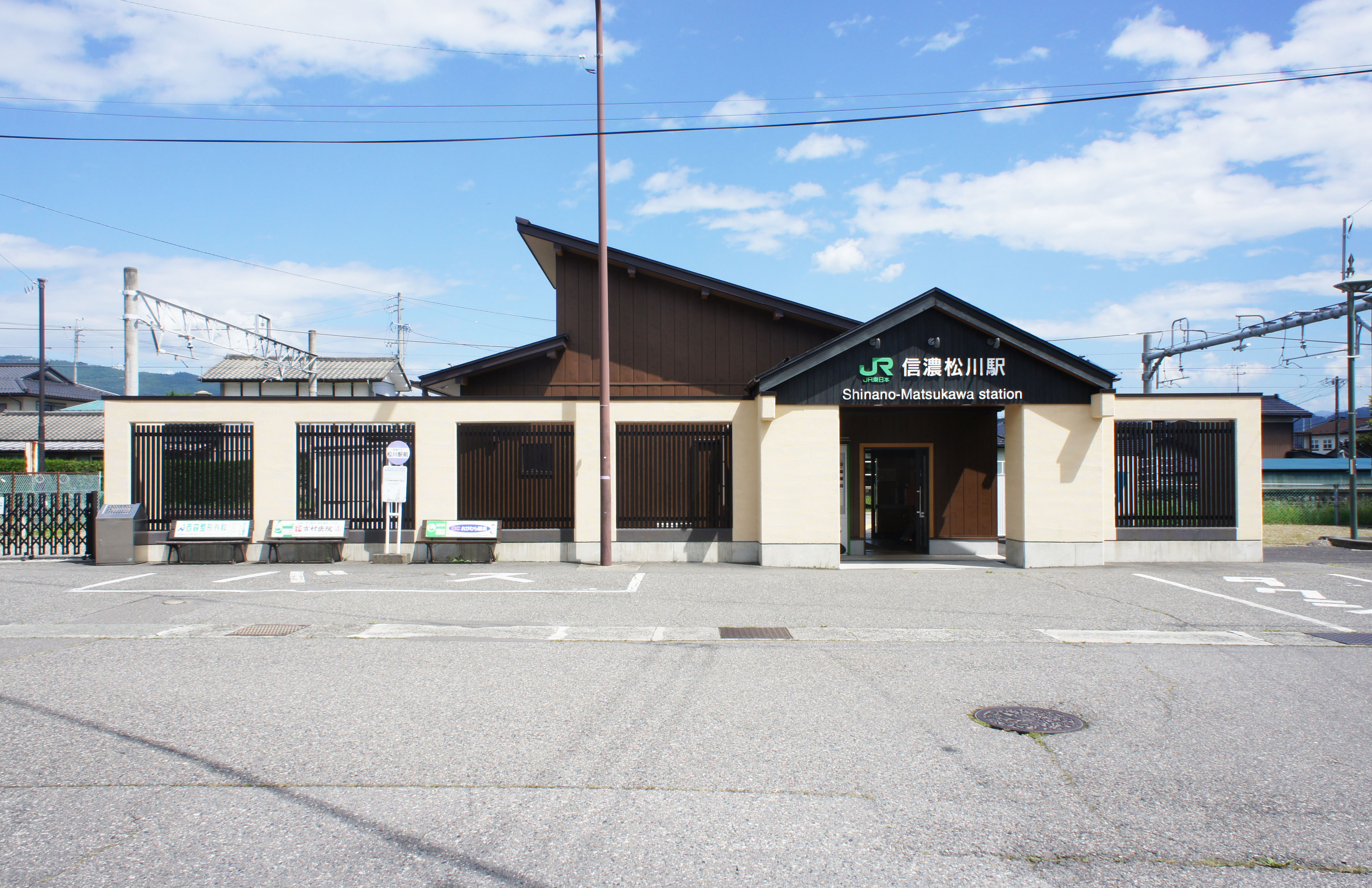
- Shinano-Matsukawa Station, August 2021

General information
- Location: 7025-10, Matsukawa-mura, Kitaazumi-gun, Nagano-ken 399-8501; Japan
- Coordinates: 36.4247°N 137.8586°E
- Elevation: 613.6 meters
- Operator: JR East
- Line: ■ Ōito Line
- Distance: 26.0 km from Matsumoto
- Platforms: 1 island platform

Other information
- Status: Staffed (Midori no Madoguchi)
- Station code: 27
- Website: Official website

History
- Opened: 29 September 1915
- Former names: Ikeda-Matsukawa Station (to 1937)

Passengers
- FY2015: 601

Services
Preceding station	JR East	Following station
Shinano-Tokiwa One-way operation	Ōito Line Rapid	Azumi-Oiwake 30 towards Matsumoto
Azumi-Kutsukake 26 towards Minami-Otari	Ōito Line Local	Kita-Hosono 28 towards Matsumoto
Location
- Location within Nagano Prefecture Location within Japan

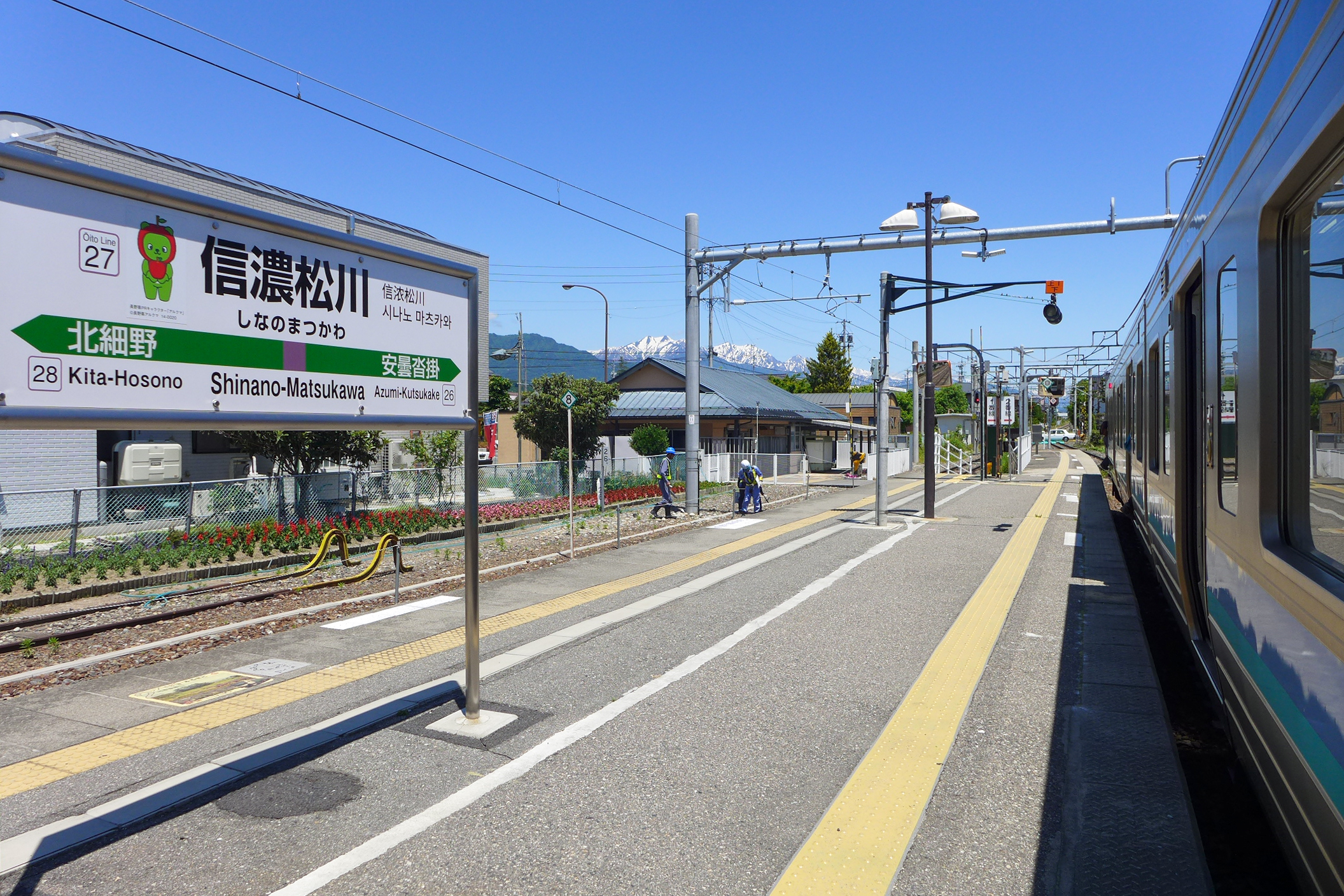
Platform of Shinano-Matsukawa Station

Shinano-Matsukawa Station (信濃松川駅, Shinano-Matsukawa-eki) is a railway station in the village of Matsukawa, Nagano Prefecture, Japan, operated by East Japan Railway Company (JR East).

== Lines ==
Shinano-Matsukawa Station is served by the Ōito Line and is 26.0 kilometers from the terminus of the line at Matsumoto Station.

== Station layout ==
The station consists of one ground-level island platform connected to the station building by a level crossing. The station has a Midori no Madoguchi staffed ticket office.

=== Platforms ===
1	■ Ōito Line	for Hotaka, Toyoshina and Matsumoto
2	■ Ōito Line	for Shinano-Ōmachi, Hakuba and Minami-Otari

== History ==
The station opened on 29 September 1915 as Ikeda-Matsukawa Station (池田松川駅) on the Shinano Railway. The Shinano Railway was integrated into the Japanese Government Railways on 1 June 1937 and the station was renamed to its present name the same day. With the privatization of Japanese National Railways (JNR) on 1 April 1987 the station came under the control of JR East.

== Passenger statistics ==
In fiscal 2015, the station was used by an average of 601 passengers daily (boarding passengers only).

== Surrounding area ==
- National Route 147
- Matsukawa village hall
- Matsukawa post office

== See also ==
- List of railway stations in Japan
