= Kita-Hosono Station =

Railway station in Matsukawa, Nagano Prefecture, Japan

Ōito Line28 Kita-Hosono Station 北細野駅
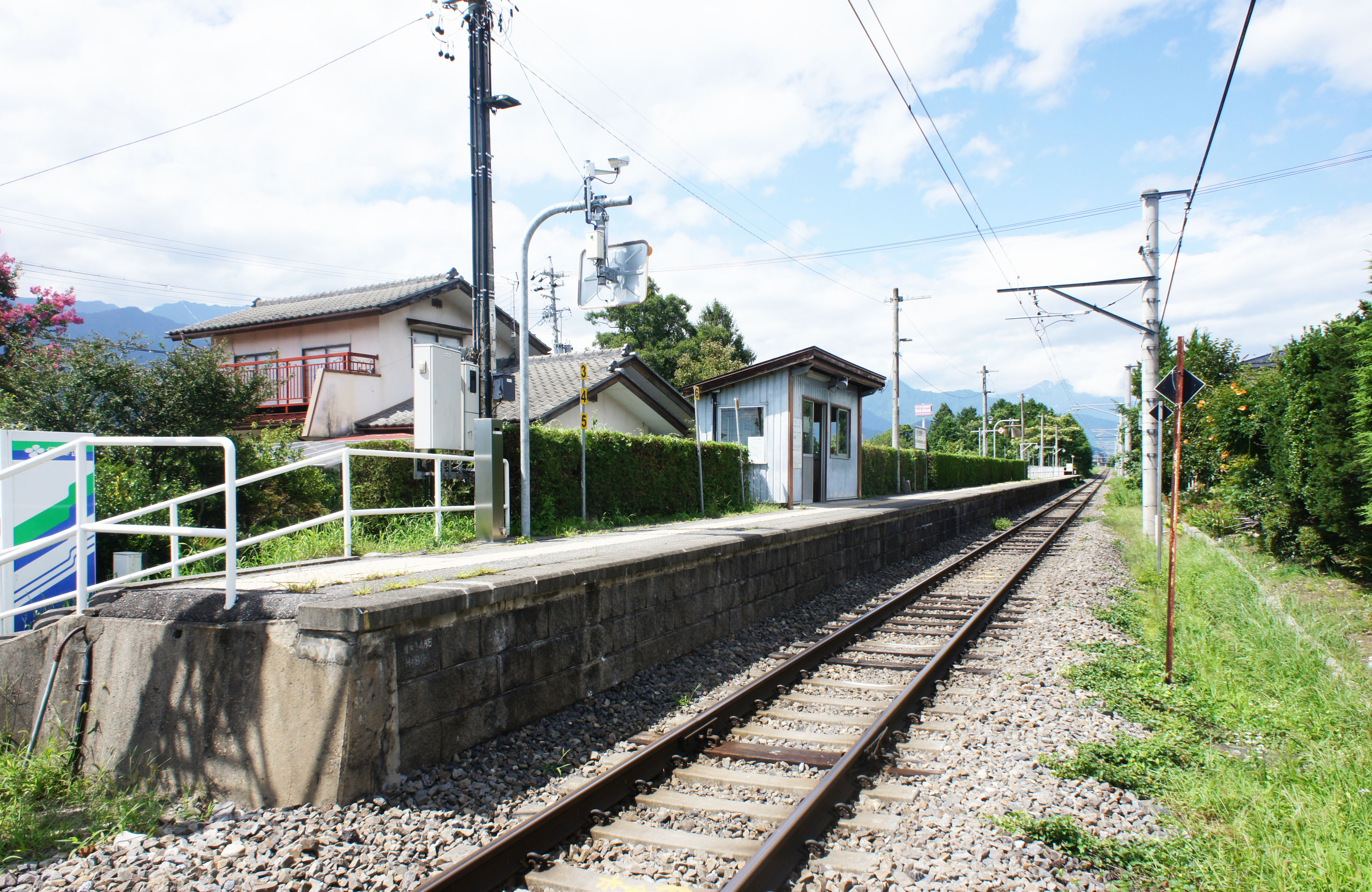
- Kita-Hosono Station, August 2021

General information
- Location: Akashiba, Matsukawa-mura, Kitaazumi-gun, Nagano-ken 399-8501; Japan
- Coordinates: 36.4065°N 137.8629°E
- Elevation: 587.9 meters
- Operator: JR East
- Line: ■ Ōito Line
- Distance: 23.8 km from Matsumoto
- Platforms: 1 side platform

Other information
- Status: Unstaffed
- Station code: 28
- Website: Official website

History
- Opened: 28 October 1930
- Former names: Okame-mae (until 1937)

Passengers
- FY2011: 130

Services
Preceding station	JR East	Following station
Shinano-Matsukawa 27 towards Minami-Otari	Ōito Line Local	Hosono 29 towards Matsumoto
Location
- Location within Nagano Prefecture Location within Japan

Kita-Hosono Station (北細野駅, Kita-Hosono-eki) is a railway station in the village of Matsukawa, Nagano Prefecture, Japan, operated by East Japan Railway Company (JR East).

== Lines ==
Kita-Hosono Station is served by the Ōito Line and is 23.8 kilometers from the terminus of the line at Matsumoto Station.

== Station layout ==
The station consists of one ground-level side platform serving a single bi-directional track. The station is unattended.

== History ==
The station opened on 28 October 1930 as Okame-mae Station (おかめ前駅). It was renamed to its present name on 1 June 1937. With the privatization of Japanese National Railways (JNR) on 1 April 1987, the station came under the control of JR East.

== Surrounding area ==
- National Route 147

== See also ==
- List of railway stations in Japan
