= Hosono (surname) =

Hosono (Japanese: 細野) is a Japanese surname. Notable people with the surname include:

- Fujihiko Hosono (細野 不二彦; born 1959), Japanese manga artist
- Goshi Hosono (細野 豪志; born 1971), Japanese politician
- Haruomi Hosono (細野 晴臣; born 1947), Japanese musician
- Hideo Hosono (細野 秀雄; born 1953), Japanese scientist
- Masabumi Hosono (細野 正文; 1870–1939), Japanese civil servant and RMS Titanic passenger
- Masayo Hosono (細野 雅世; born 1978), Japanese voice actress
- Yumiko Hosono (細野 佑美子; born 1981), Japanese voice actress, actress and singer
